= 1985 in the United States =

- Decades: 1960s; 1970s; 1980s; 1990s; 2000s
- See also: History of the United States (1980–1991); Timeline of United States history (1970–1989); List of years in the United States

Events from the year 1985 in the United States.

== Incumbents ==
=== Federal government ===
- President: Ronald Reagan (R-California)
- Vice President: George H. W. Bush (R-Texas)
- Chief Justice: Warren E. Burger (Virginia)
- Speaker of the House of Representatives: Tip O'Neill (D-Massachusetts)
- Senate Majority Leader:

Howard Baker (R-Tennessee) (until January 3)
Bob Dole (R-Kansas) (starting January 3)

- Congress: 98th (until January 3), 99th (starting January 3)

==== State governments ====
Governors and lieutenant governors

=== Governors ===
- Governor of Alabama: George Wallace (Democratic)
- Governor of Alaska: Bill Sheffield (Democratic)
- Governor of Arizona: Bruce Babbitt (Democratic)
- Governor of Arkansas: Bill Clinton (Democratic)
- Governor of California: George Deukmejian (Republican)
- Governor of Colorado: Richard Lamm (Democratic)
- Governor of Connecticut: William A. O'Neill (Democratic)
- Governor of Delaware: Pierre S. du Pont IV (Republican) (until January 15), Michael Castle (Republican) (starting January 15)
- Governor of Florida: Bob Graham (Democratic)
- Governor of Georgia: Joe Frank Harris (Democratic)
- Governor of Hawaii: George Ariyoshi (Democratic)
- Governor of Idaho: John V. Evans (Democratic)
- Governor of Illinois: James R. Thompson (Republican)
- Governor of Indiana: Robert D. Orr (Republican)
- Governor of Iowa: Terry E. Branstad (Republican)
- Governor of Kansas: John W. Carlin (Democratic)
- Governor of Kentucky: Martha Layne Collins (Democratic)
- Governor of Louisiana: Edwin W. Edwards (Democratic)
- Governor of Maine: Joseph E. Brennan (Democratic)
- Governor of Maryland: Harry R. Hughes (Democratic)
- Governor of Massachusetts: Michael Dukakis (Democratic)
- Governor of Michigan: James Blanchard (Democratic)
- Governor of Minnesota: Rudy Perpich (Democratic)
- Governor of Mississippi: William Allain (Democratic)
- Governor of Missouri: Kit Bond (Republican) (until January 14), John Ashcroft (Republican) (starting January 14)
- Governor of Montana: Ted Schwinden (Democratic)
- Governor of Nebraska: Bob Kerrey (Democratic)
- Governor of Nevada: Richard Bryan (Democratic)
- Governor of New Hampshire: John H. Sununu (Republican)
- Governor of New Jersey: Thomas Kean (Republican)
- Governor of New Mexico: Toney Anaya (Democratic)
- Governor of New York: Mario Cuomo (Democratic)
- Governor of North Carolina: Jim Hunt (Democratic) (until January 5), James G. Martin (Republican) (starting January 5)
- Governor of North Dakota: Allen I. Olson (Republican) (until January 1), George A. Sinner (Democratic) (starting January 1)
- Governor of Ohio: Dick Celeste (Democratic)
- Governor of Oklahoma: George Nigh (Democratic)
- Governor of Oregon: Victor G. Atiyeh (Republican)
- Governor of Pennsylvania: Dick Thornburgh (Republican)
- Governor of Rhode Island: J. Joseph Garrahy (Democratic) (until January 1), Edward D. DiPrete (Republican) (starting January 1)
- Governor of South Carolina: Richard Riley (Democratic)
- Governor of South Dakota: William J. Janklow (Republican)
- Governor of Tennessee: Lamar Alexander (Republican)
- Governor of Texas: Mark White (Democratic)
- Governor of Utah: Scott M. Matheson (Democratic) (until January 7), Norman H. Bangerter (Republican) (starting January 7)
- Governor of Vermont: Richard A. Snelling (Republican) (until January 10), Madeleine M. Kunin (Democratic) (starting January 10)
- Governor of Virginia: Chuck Robb (Democratic)
- Governor of Washington: John Spellman (Republican) (until January 16), Booth Gardner (Democratic) (starting January 16)
- Governor of West Virginia: Jay Rockefeller (Democratic) (until January 14), Arch A. Moore Jr. (Republican) (starting January 14)
- Governor of Wisconsin: Tony Earl (Democratic)
- Governor of Wyoming: Edgar J. Herschler (Democratic)

=== Lieutenant governors ===
- Lieutenant Governor of Alabama: Bill Baxley (Democratic)
- Lieutenant Governor of Alaska: Stephen McAlpine (Democratic)
- Lieutenant Governor of Arkansas: Winston Bryant (Democratic)
- Lieutenant Governor of California: Leo T. McCarthy (Democratic)
- Lieutenant Governor of Colorado: Nancy Dick (Democratic)
- Lieutenant Governor of Connecticut: Joseph J. Fauliso (Democratic)
- Lieutenant Governor of Delaware: Michael N. Castle (Republican) (until January 15), Shien Biau Woo (Democratic) (starting January 15)
- Lieutenant Governor of Florida: Wayne Mixson (Democratic)
- Lieutenant Governor of Georgia: Zell Miller (Democratic)
- Lieutenant Governor of Hawaii: John D. Waihee III (Democratic)
- Lieutenant Governor of Idaho: David H. Leroy (Republican)
- Lieutenant Governor of Illinois: George H. Ryan (Republican)
- Lieutenant Governor of Indiana: John Mutz (Republican)
- Lieutenant Governor of Iowa: Robert T. Anderson (Democratic)
- Lieutenant Governor of Kansas: Thomas R. Docking (Democratic)
- Lieutenant Governor of Kentucky: Steve Beshear (Democratic)
- Lieutenant Governor of Louisiana: Robert "Bobby" Freeman (Democratic)
- Lieutenant Governor of Maryland: J. Joseph Curran (Democratic)
- Lieutenant Governor of Massachusetts: John Kerry (Democratic) (until January 2), vacant (starting January 2)
- Lieutenant Governor of Michigan: Martha W. Griffiths (Democratic)
- Lieutenant Governor of Minnesota: Marlene Johnson (Democratic)
- Lieutenant Governor of Mississippi: Brad Dye (Democratic)
- Lieutenant Governor of Missouri: Kenneth Rothman (Democratic) (until January 14), Harriett Woods (Democratic) (starting January 14)
- Lieutenant Governor of Montana: George Turman (Democratic)
- Lieutenant Governor of Nebraska: Donald F. McGinley (Democratic)
- Lieutenant Governor of Nevada: Bob Cashell (Democratic)
- Lieutenant Governor of New Mexico: Mike Runnels (Democratic)
- Lieutenant Governor of New York: Alfred DelBello (Democratic) (until February 1), Warren M. Anderson (Republican) (starting February 1)
- Lieutenant Governor of North Carolina: James C. Green (Democratic) (until month and day unknown), Robert B. Jordan III (Democratic) (starting month and day unknown)
- Lieutenant Governor of North Dakota: Ernest Sands (Republican) (until month and day unknown), Ruth Meiers (Democratic) (starting month and day unknown)
- Lieutenant Governor of Ohio: Myrl H. Shoemaker (Democratic) (until July 30), vacant (starting July 30)
- Lieutenant Governor of Oklahoma: Spencer Bernard (Democratic)
- Lieutenant Governor of Pennsylvania: William Scranton III (Republican)
- Lieutenant Governor of Rhode Island: Thomas R. DiLuglio (Democratic) (until January 1), Richard A. Licht (Democratic) (starting January 1)
- Lieutenant Governor of South Carolina: Michael R. Daniel (Democratic)
- Lieutenant Governor of South Dakota: Lowell C. Hansen II (Republican)
- Lieutenant Governor of Tennessee: John S. Wilder (Democratic)
- Lieutenant Governor of Texas: William P. Hobby Jr. (Democratic)
- Lieutenant Governor of Utah: David Smith Monson (Republican) (until January 7), W. Val Oveson (Republican) (starting January 7)
- Lieutenant Governor of Vermont: Peter Plympton Smith (Republican)
- Lieutenant Governor of Virginia: Richard Joseph Davis (Democratic)
- Lieutenant Governor of Washington: John Cherberg (Democratic)
- Lieutenant Governor of Wisconsin: James Flynn (Democratic)

== Events ==
=== January ===
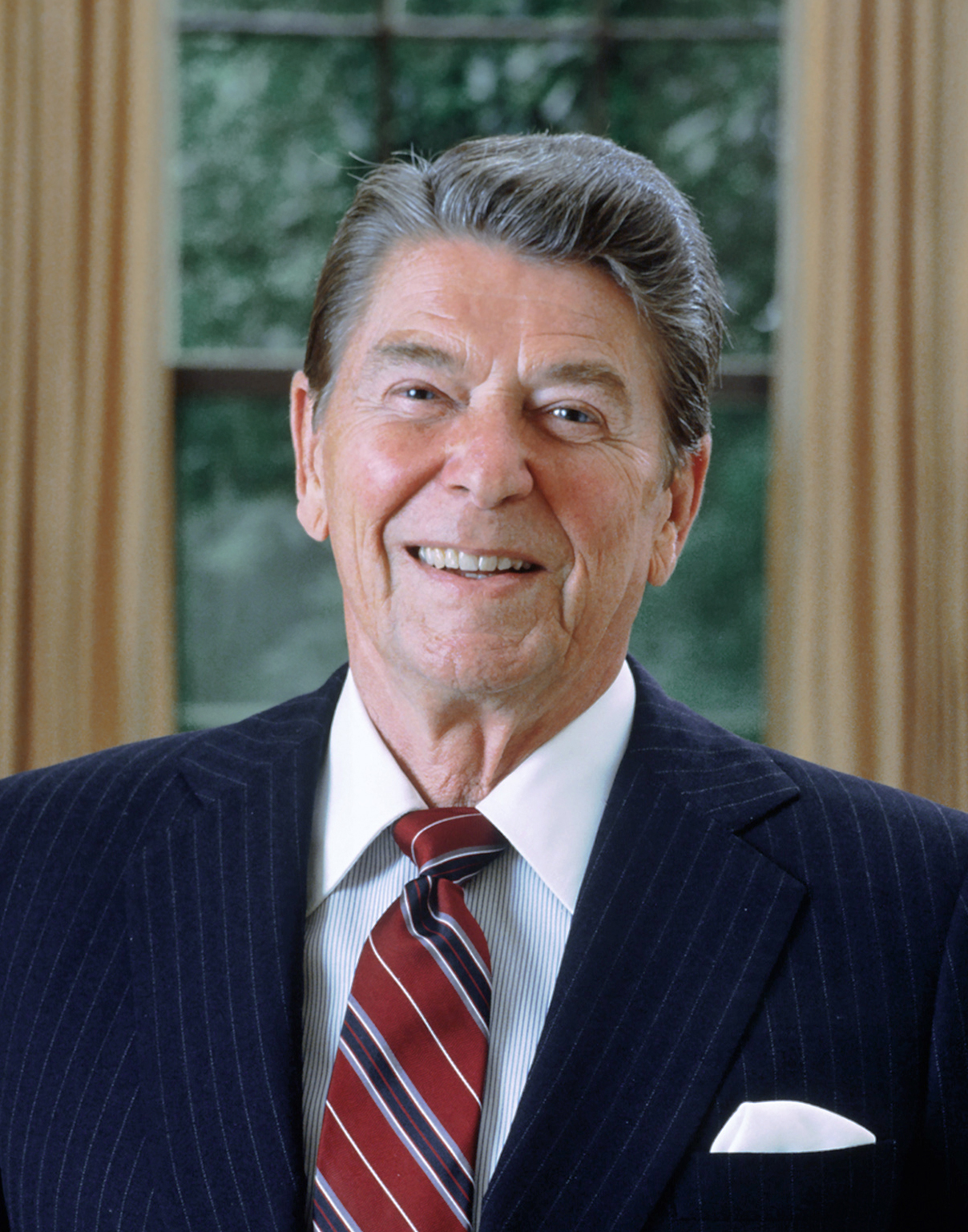
January 20: Ronald Reagan, the President of the United States, begins his second term

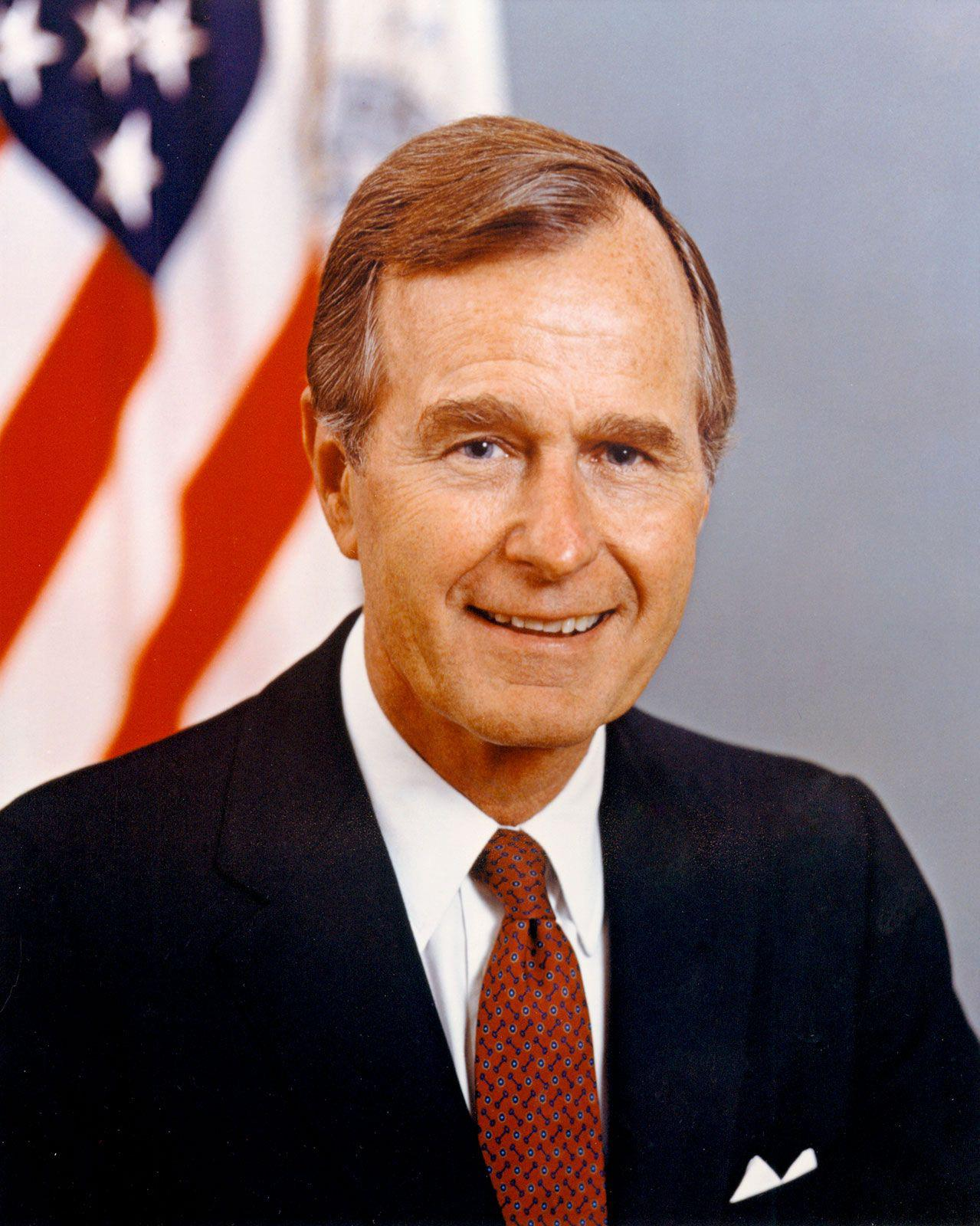
January 20: George H. W. Bush, the Vice President of the United States, begins his second term

- January 20
  - President Ronald Reagan and Vice President George H. W. Bush are privately sworn in for a second term in office (publicly sworn in, January 21).
  - Super Bowl XIX: The San Francisco 49ers defeat the Miami Dolphins 38–16 at Stanford Stadium in Palo Alto, California.
- January 28 – In Hollywood, California, the charity single "We Are the World" is recorded by USA for Africa. Like the enormously successful "Do They Know It's Christmas?" that was recorded by Band Aid in the UK two months prior, the single raises money to combat the ongoing famine in Ethiopia. The American act consists of high-profile performers, including Michael Jackson, Lionel Richie, Tina Turner, Cyndi Lauper and Diana Ross.

=== February ===
- February 5 – Australia cancels its involvement in United States-led MX missile tests.
- February 6 – President Reagan delivers his fourth State of the Union Address to the Congress. The congress sings Happy Birthday to him afterwards.
- February 9 – U.S. drug agent Enrique Camarena is kidnapped and murdered in Mexico (his body is discovered on March 5).
- February 13 – Bobby Knight throws a chair across a basketball court.
- February 14
  - CNN reporter Jeremy Levin is freed from captivity in Lebanon.
  - 21-year-old female singer Whitney Houston releases her debut album – Whitney Houston.
- February 15 – John Hughes’ The Breakfast Club is released in theaters

=== March ===
- March 1 – The GNU Manifesto by Richard Stallman is published for the first time.
- March 4 – The Food and Drug Administration approves a blood test for AIDS, used since then to screen all blood donations in the United States.
- March 6 – Boxer Mike Tyson makes his professional debut in Albany, New York, a match which he wins by a first-round knockout.
- March 8 – A car bomb planted in Beirut by CIA mercenaries attempts to kill Islamic cleric Sayyed Mohammad Hussein Fadlallah. He survives, but the bomb kills more than 80 people and injures 200.
- March 16 – Associated Press newsman Terry Anderson is taken hostage in Beirut (he is eventually released on December 4, 1991).
- March 25 – The 57th Academy Awards, hosted by Jack Lemmon, are held at Dorothy Chandler Pavilion in Los Angeles, with Miloš Forman's Amadeus winning Best Picture and Best Director (Forman's second win), along with six other awards out of 11 nominations. The film is tied in nominations with David Lean's A Passage to India.
- March 31 – WrestleMania debuts at Madison Square Garden in New York City, New York.

=== April ===
- The National Archives and Records Administration is established as an independent federal agency.
- Cincinnati, Ohio–based Procter & Gamble ditches the moon & stars symbol from its packaging.
- April 1 – Eighth-seeded Villanova defeats national powerhouse Georgetown, 66–64, to win the first 64-team field NCAA Tournament in Lexington, Kentucky.
- April 7 – National Geographic Explorer debuts on Nickelodeon.
- April 11 – The USS Coral Sea collides with the Ecuadorian tanker ship Napo off the coast of Cuba.
- April 12 – 1985 El Descanso bombing: A terrorist bombing attributed to the Islamic Jihad Organization in the El Descanso restaurant near Madrid, Spain, mostly attended by U.S. personnel of the Torrejon Air Force Base, causes 18 dead (all Spaniards) and 82 injured.
- April 19 – A four-day siege of white supremacist group The Covenant, The Sword, and the Arm of the Lord begins in Arkansas.
- April 23 – Coca-Cola changes its recipe and releases New Coke. The response is overwhelmingly negative, and the original formula is back on the market in less than three months.

=== May ===
- May 5 – U.S. President Ronald Reagan joins West German Chancellor Helmut Kohl for a controversial funeral service at a cemetery in Bitburg, Germany, which includes the graves of 59 elite S.S. troops from World War II.
- May 11 – The FBI brings charges against the suspected heads of the five Mafia families in New York City.
- May 13 – Philadelphia, Pennsylvania Mayor Wilson Goode orders police to storm the radical black American resistance group MOVE's headquarters to end a stand-off. The police drop an explosive device into the headquarters, killing eleven members of MOVE and destroying the homes of 61 city residents in the resulting fire.
- May 15 – An explosive device sent by the Unabomber injures John Hauser at UC Berkeley.
- May 19 – John Anthony Walker Jr., is arrested by the FBI for passing classified Naval communications onto the Soviets.
- May 31 – Forty-one tornadoes hit in Ohio, Pennsylvania, New York and Ontario, killing 76 people.

=== June ===
- June 9 – Los Angeles Lakers win the NBA championship, defeating the Boston Celtics.
- June 13 – In Auburn, Washington, police defuse a Unabomber bomb sent to Boeing.
- June 14 – TWA Flight 847, carrying 153 passengers from Athens to Rome, is hijacked by a Hezbollah fringe group. One passenger, U.S. Navy Petty Officer Robert Stethem, is killed.
- June 17 – John Hendricks launches the Discovery Channel in the United States.
- June 20 – NeXT is founded by Steve Jobs after he resigns from Apple Computer.
- June 24 – STS-51-G: Space Shuttle Discovery completes its mission, best remembered for having Sultan bin Salman Al Saud, the first Arab and first Muslim in space, as a payload specialist.
- June 26
  - A Walt Disney World Monorail System train catches fire in Epcot around 9:00 p.m, due to friction caused by a flat tire.
  - U.S. Route 66 is officially decommissioned.

=== July ===
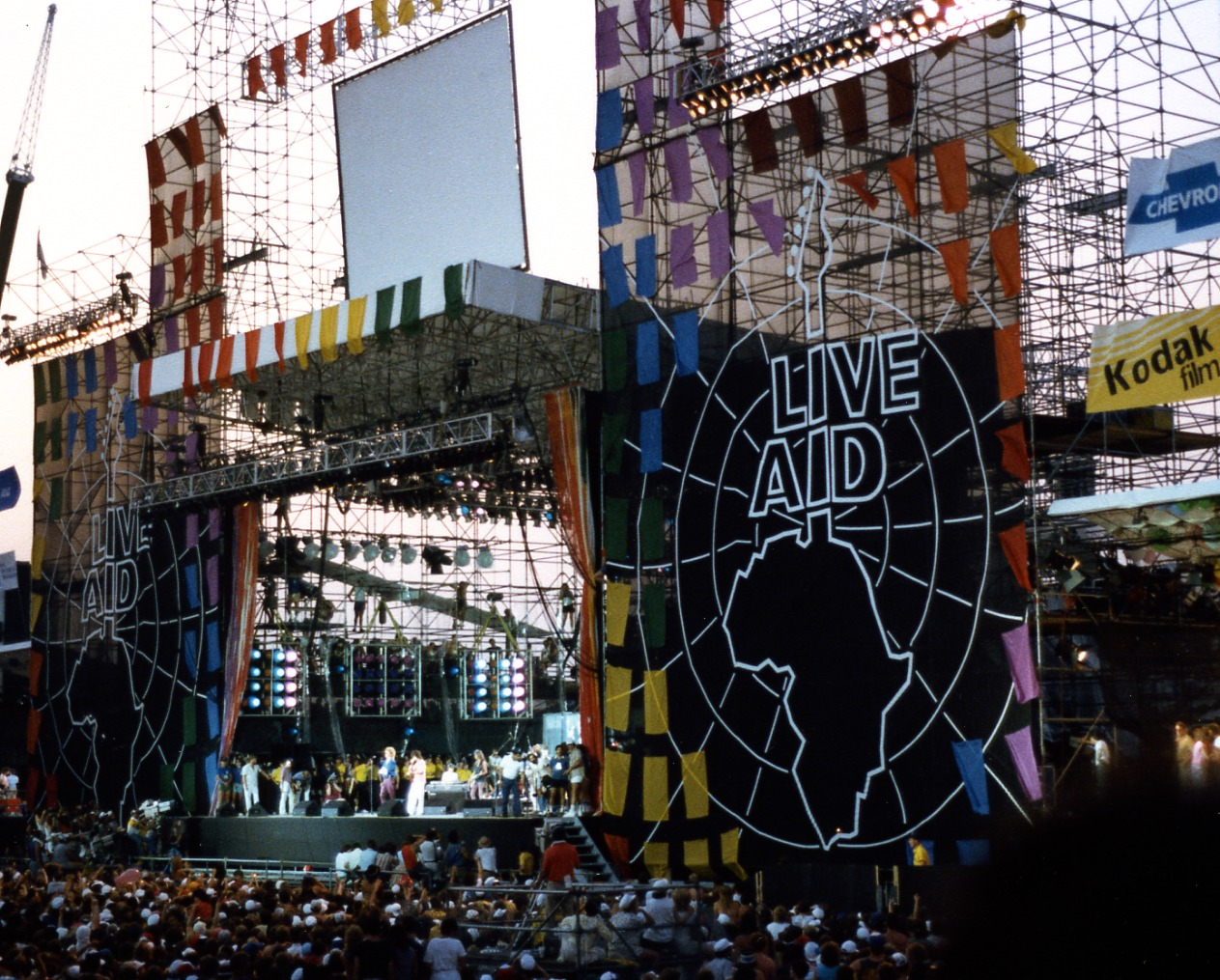
July 13: Live Aid in Philadelphia

- July 1
  - Nick at Nite, a nighttime program service with an emphasis on classic television reruns, is launched in the United States, being broadcast on the same channel as Nickelodeon.
  - A&E, which previously shared Nickelodeon's channel, begins broadcasting as its own 24-hour cable channel in January of that year on a separate satellite transponder.
- July 3 – Back to the Future opens in American theaters and ends up being the highest-grossing film of 1985 in the United States, and the first film in the successful franchise.
- July 13
  - Live Aid pop concerts in Philadelphia, Pennsylvania and London raise over £50,000,000 for famine relief in Ethiopia.
  - Vice President George H. W. Bush serves as the first official acting president from 11:28 am to 7:22 pm EST, while President Ronald Reagan undergoes colon cancer surgery under anesthesia.
- July 19 – Vice President George H. W. Bush announces that New Hampshire teacher Christa McAuliffe will become the first school teacher to ride aboard the soon ill-fated Space Shuttle Challenger.
- July 20 – The main shipwreck site of the Spanish galleon Nuestra Señora de Atocha (which sank in 1622) is found forty miles off the coast of Key West, Florida by treasure hunters who begin to excavate $400,000,000 in coins and silver.
- July 24
  - Commodore launches the Amiga personal computer at the Lincoln Center in New York City.
  - Walt Disney Feature Animation's 25th feature film, The Black Cauldron, is released. Considered one of the studio's darkest releases, it receives mixed reviews and results in a large revenue loss for Disney, putting the future of its animation department in jeopardy.

=== August ===
- August 2 – Delta Air Lines Flight 191 crashes near Dallas, Texas, killing 137 people.
- August 4 – Major League Baseball player Rod Carew of the California Angels becomes the sixteenth player to achieve 3,000 hits in a career.
- August 20 – Iran–Contra affair: The first arms, 96 BGM-71 TOWs, are sent to Iran in exchange for hostages in Lebanon and profits for the Nicaraguan Contras without public knowledge.
- August 25 – Samantha Smith, "Goodwill Ambassador" between the Soviet Union and the United States for writing a letter to Yuri Andropov about nuclear war, and eventually visiting the Soviet Union at Andropov's request, dies in the Bar Harbor Airlines Flight 1808 plane crash. She was 13 years old.
- August 26 – Ryan White, who was expelled from Western High School in Indiana, is allowed to attend his first day of classes via telephone.
- August 28 – The first smoking ban for restaurants in the United States is passed in Aspen, Colorado.
- August 31 – Richard Ramirez, the serial killer known as the Night Stalker, is captured in Los Angeles.

=== September ===
- September 2 – Hurricane Elena makes landfall on the U.S. Gulf Coast after reaching Category 3 status.
- September 4 – Catcher Gary Carter of the New York Mets ties a record with five home runs in two games.
- September 6 – Midwest Express Airlines Flight 105, a Douglas DC-9, crashes just after takeoff from Milwaukee, Wisconsin, killing 31 people.
- September 9 – Laborers of two food processing facilities in Watsonville, California, organize a strike against recent wage and benefits reductions.
- September 11 – Pete Rose becomes the all-time hit leader in Major League Baseball, with his 4,192nd hit at Riverfront Stadium in Cincinnati.
- September 13 – Steve Jobs resigns from Apple Computer in order to found NeXT.
- September 26 – Kalina, the first captive orca born at SeaWorld as well as the first to survive past infancy, is born at SeaWorld Orlando.

=== October ===
- October 4 – The Free Software Foundation is founded in Massachusetts.
- October 7
  - The cruise ship Achille Lauro is hijacked in the Mediterranean Sea by four heavily armed Palestinian terrorists. One passenger, American Leon Klinghoffer, is killed.
  - The Mameyes landslide in Puerto Rico kills close to 300 people in the worst ever landslide in North American history.
- October 15 – In separate events, mail bombs kill two people in Salt Lake City, Utah; a third bomb explodes the next day, injuring career counterfeiter Mark Hofmann. The ensuing police investigation leads to the arrest of Hofmann for the two murders.
- October 18 – The Nintendo Entertainment System is released in U.S. stores.
- October 27 – The Kansas City Royals defeat the St. Louis Cardinals, 4 games to 3, to win their first World Series title.

=== November ===
- November 13 – Xavier Suárez is sworn in as Miami's first Cuban-born mayor.
- November 18 – The comic strip Calvin and Hobbes appears for the first time, in 35 newspapers.
- November 19 – Cold War: In Geneva, U.S. President Ronald Reagan and Soviet Union leader Mikhail Gorbachev meet for the first time.
- November 20 – Microsoft Corporation releases the first version of Windows, Windows 1.0.
- November 26 – U.S. President Ronald Reagan sells the rights to his autobiography to Random House for a record US$3,000,000.

=== December ===
- December 1 – The Ford Taurus and Mercury Sable are released for sale to the public.
- December 12 – Arrow Air Flight 1285, a Douglas DC-8, crashes after takeoff in Gander, Newfoundland, killing 256, 248 of whom were U.S. servicemen returning to Fort Campbell, Kentucky from overseeing a peacekeeping force in Sinai.
- December 16 – In New York City, Mafia bosses Paul Castellano and Thomas Bilotti are shot dead in front of Spark's Steak House, making hit organizer John Gotti the leader of the powerful Gambino crime family.
- December 24 – Right wing extremist David Lewis Rice murders civil rights attorney Charles Goldmark as well as Goldmark's wife and two children in Seattle. Rice suspected the family of being both Jewish and Communist, and claimed his dedication to the Christian Identity movement drove him to the crime.
- December 27 – American naturalist Dian Fossey is found murdered in Rwanda.
- December 31 – The last issue of The Columbus Citizen-Journal is circulated.

=== Undated ===
- "The Year of the Spy", name given by media to 1985 because of a large number of foreign spies arrested in the United States.
- The Tommy Hilfiger brand is established.
- The Asian tiger mosquito, an invasive species, is first found in Houston, Texas.
- ATI Technologies is founded (originally as Array Technology) in North America by Lee Ka Lau, Francis Lau, Benny Lau and Kwok Yuen Ho.

=== Ongoing ===
- Cold War (1947–1991)
- Iran–Contra affair (1985–1987)

== Births ==
=== January ===
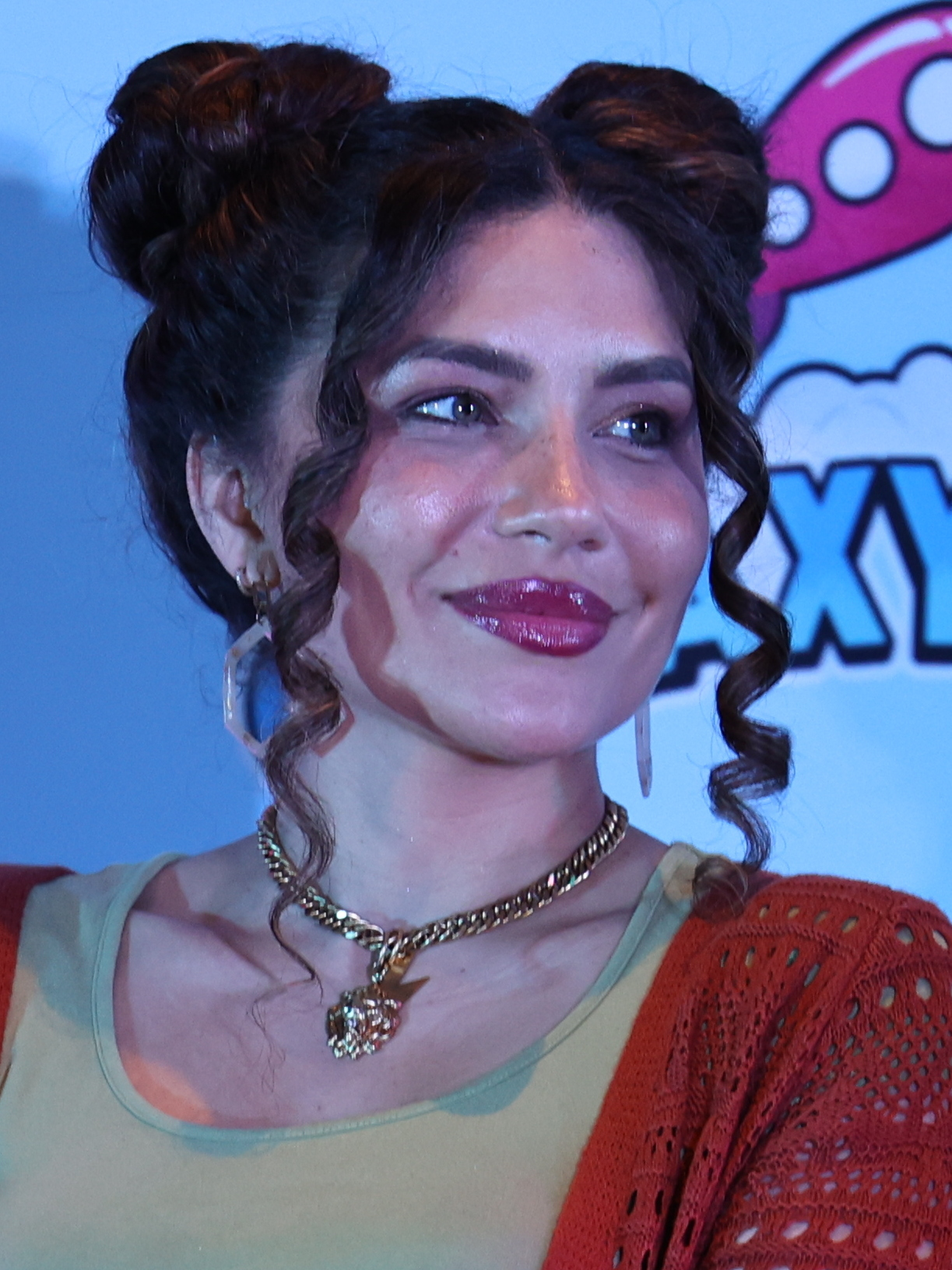
Juliana Harkavy

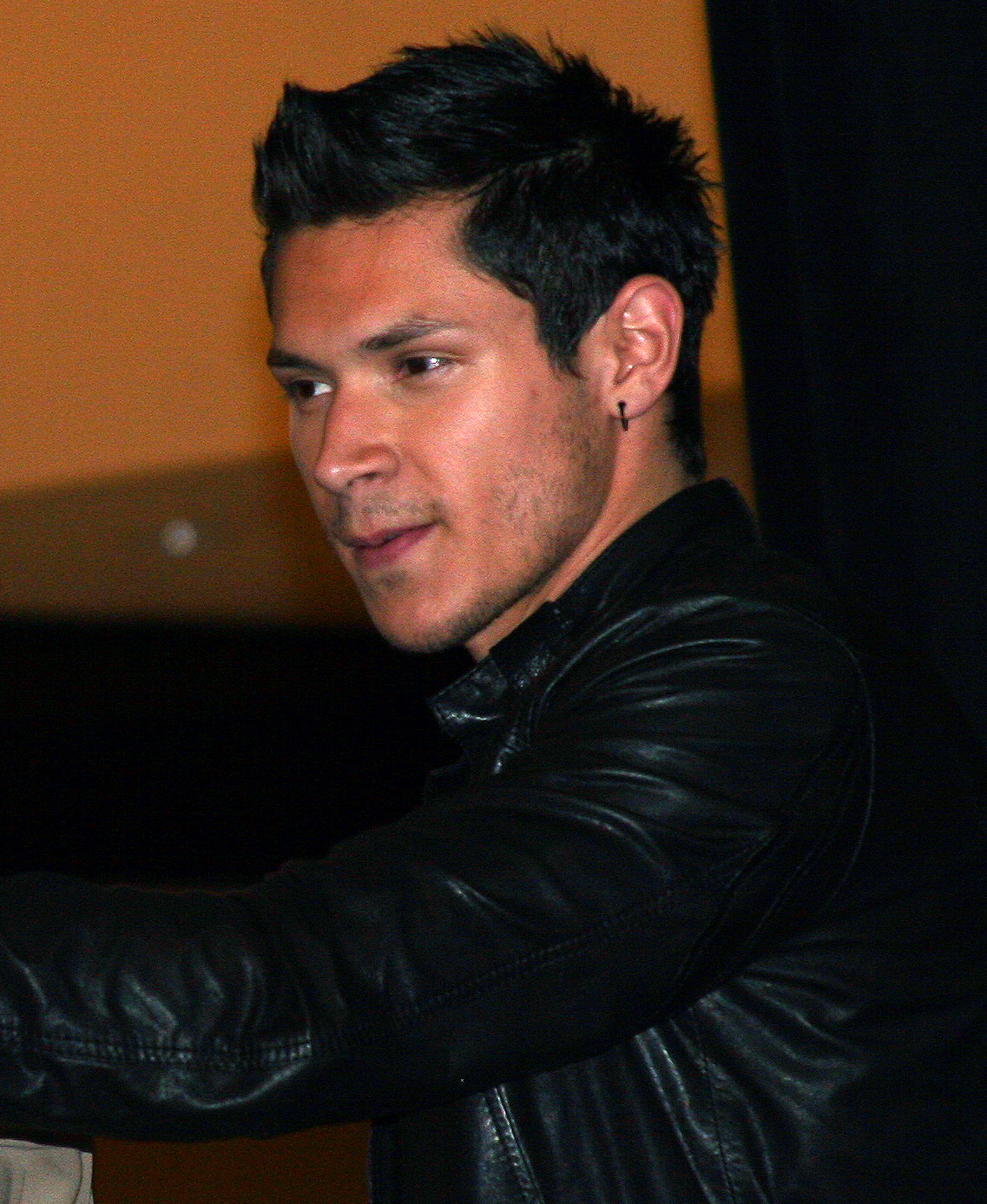
Alex Meraz

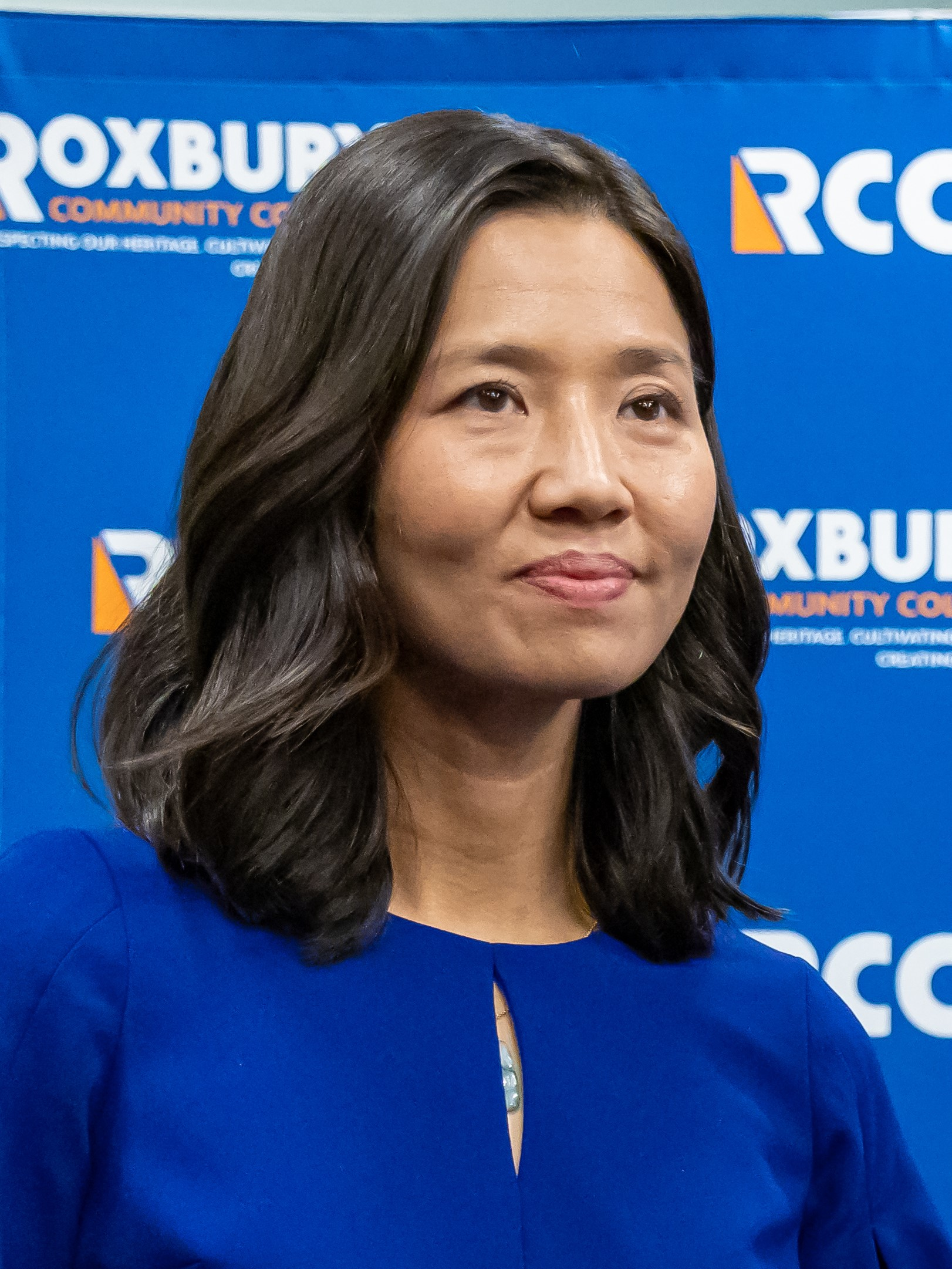
Michelle Wu

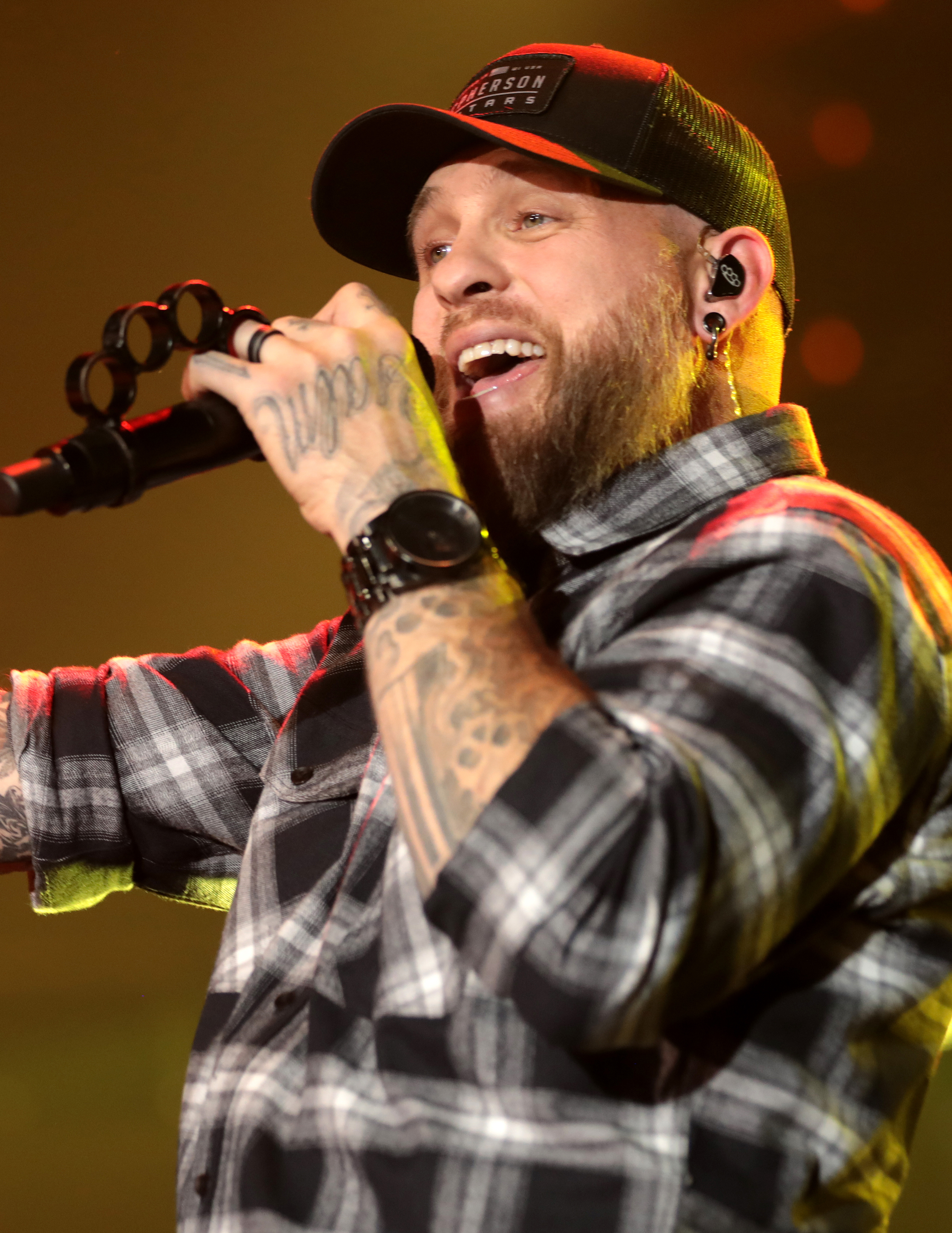
Brantley Gilbert

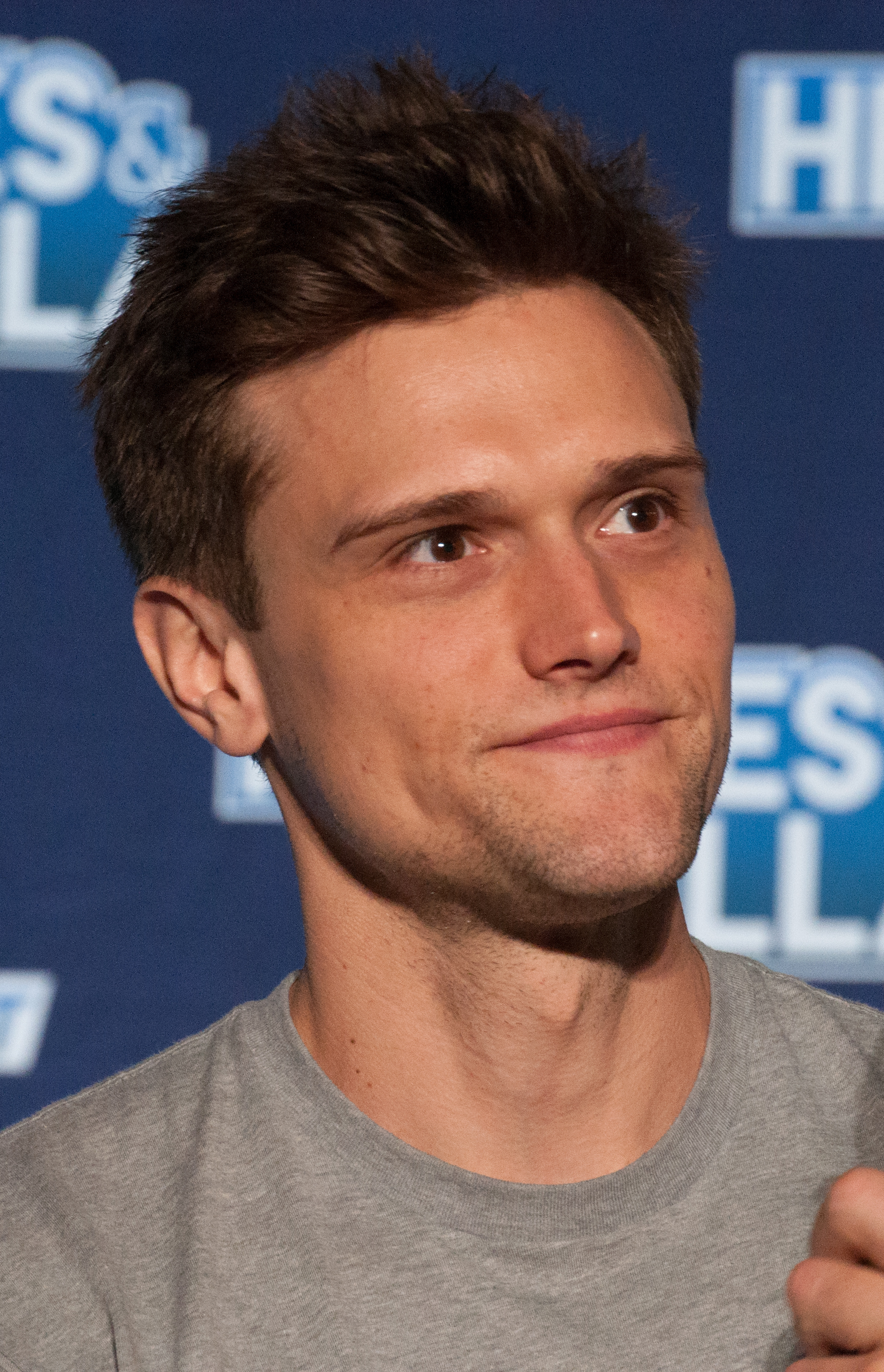
Hartley Sawyer

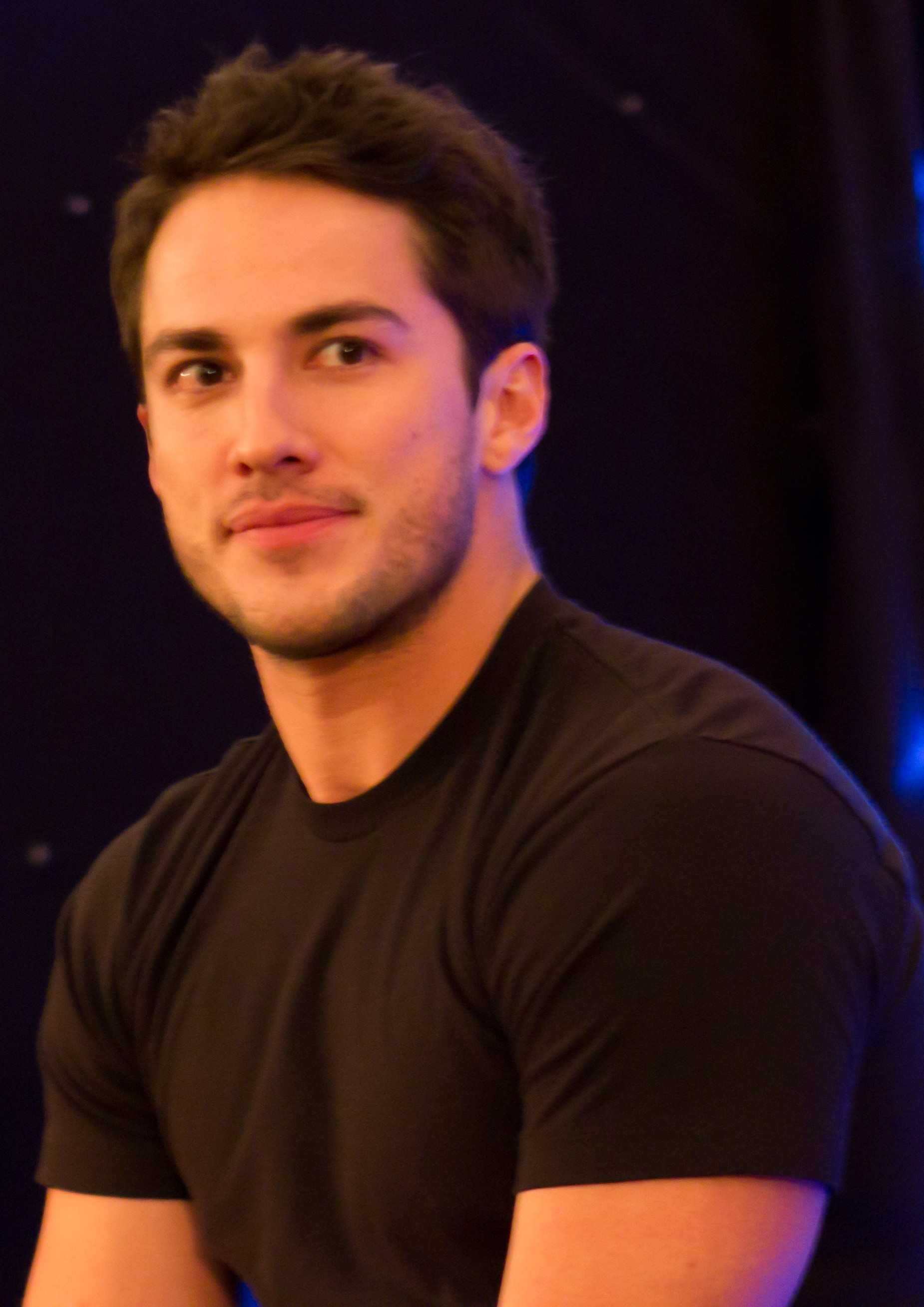
Michael Trevino

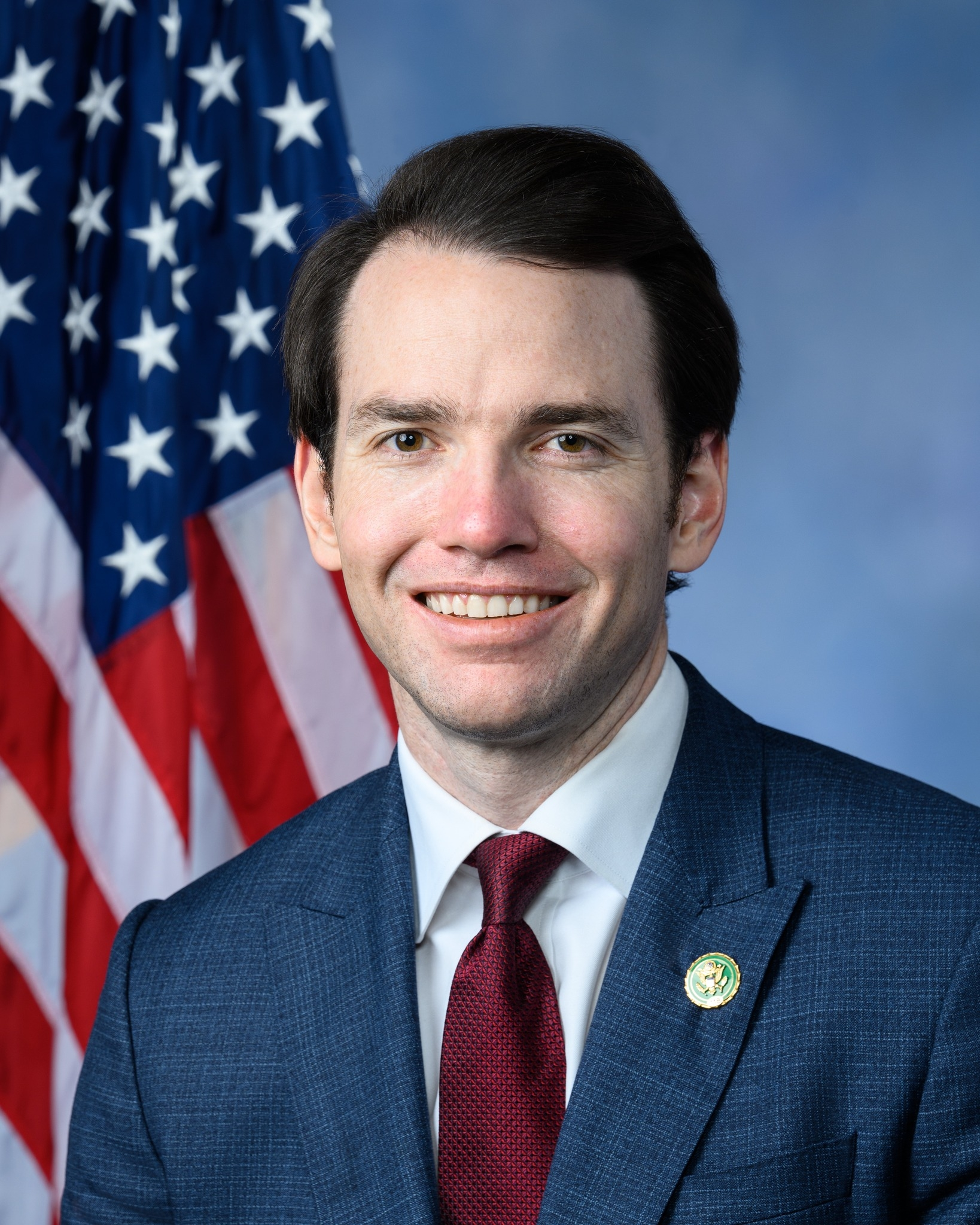
Kevin Kiley

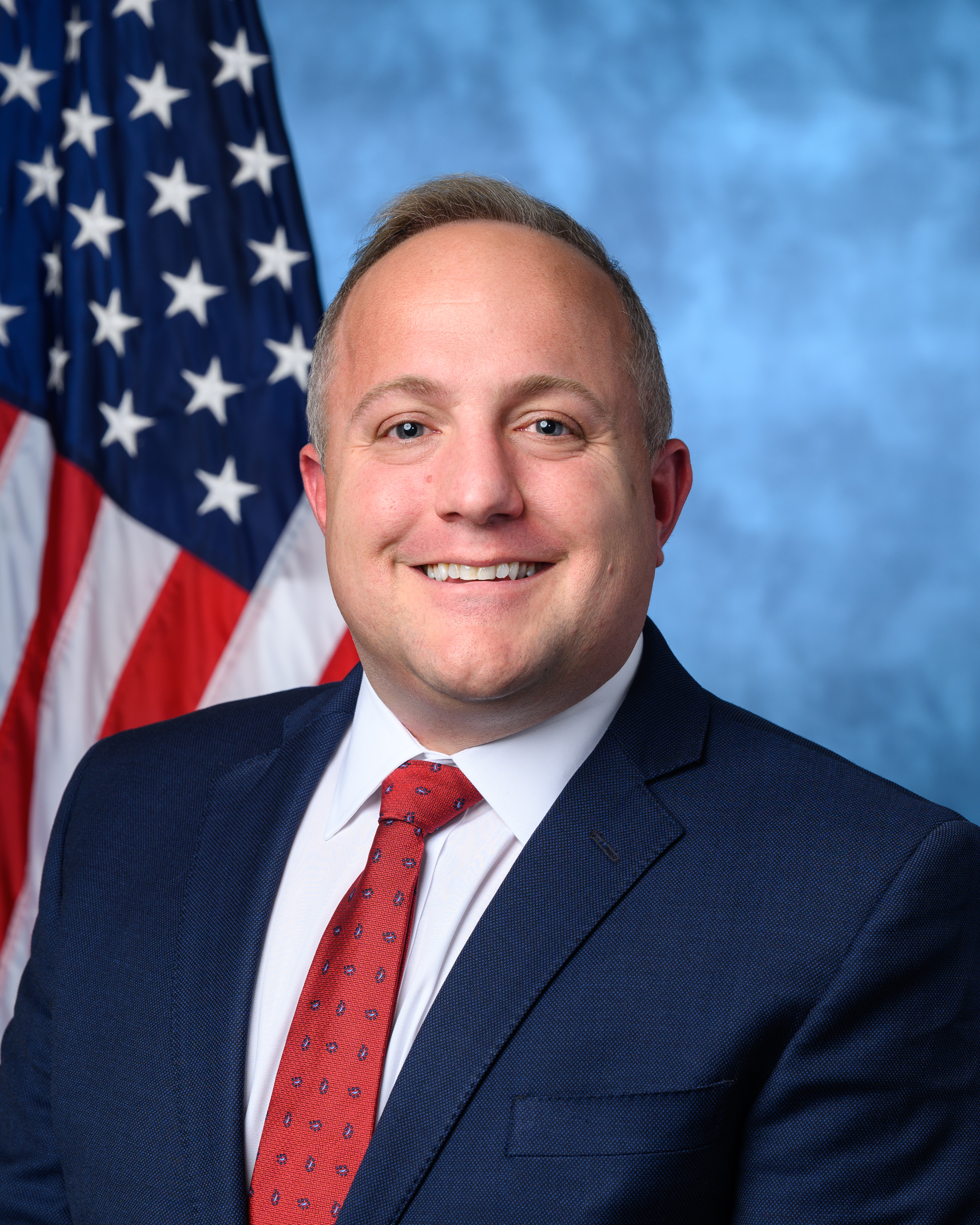
Russell Fry

- January 1
  - Chris Cayole, basketball player
  - Juliana Harkavy, actress
  - Dan Koh, politician
- January 2
  - Jolene Creighton, journalist and media executive
  - Adrienne Lyle, Olympic dressage rider
  - Heather O'Reilly, soccer player
  - Greg Toler, football player
- January 3
  - Asa Akira, pornographic actress and director
  - Condrew Allen, football player
  - Nicole Beharie, actress and singer
  - John David Booty, football player
- January 4 – Al Jefferson, basketball player
- January 5 – Luvvie Ajayi, Nigerian-born author, speaker, and digital strategist
- January 6 – Ian M. Anderson, founder of Afternoon Records
- January 8
  - Arctic Hospital, DJ and record producer
  - Adam Cristman, soccer player
  - Rachael Lampa, Christian singer
  - Dan O'Connor, guitarist and frontman for Four Year Strong
- January 9
  - Brett Camerota, Olympic Nordic combined skier
  - Eric Camerota, Olympic Nordic combined skier
- January 10 – Alex Meraz, actor, dancer, and martial artist
- January 11
  - Saba Ahmed, Pakistani-born political activist, lawyer, engineer, and founder of the Republican Muslim Coalition
  - Lucy Knisley, comic artist and musician
  - Aja Naomi King, actress
- January 12
  - Cynthia Addai-Robinson, actress
  - Michael J. Pagan, actor
  - Issa Rae, actress
- January 14
  - Billy Chiles, soccer player
  - Michelle Wu, politician, mayor of Boston, Massachusetts (2021–present)
- January 15 – Brandon Mebane, football player
- January 16
  - Ash Christian, actor, film director, and producer (d. 2020)
  - Joe Flacco, football player
  - Renée Felice Smith, actress
  - Anna M. Valencia, politician
- January 18 – Matt Hobby, actor and comedian
- January 19
  - Jake Allen, football player
  - Damien Chazelle, film director and screenwriter
- January 20
  - Antoine Agudio, basketball player
  - Lauren Cahoon, Olympic Taekwondo practitioner
  - Brantley Gilbert, country singer/songwriter
- January 21
  - Telfar Clemens, fashion designer and founder of TELFAR
  - Nick Gehlfuss, actor
  - Salvatore Giunta, U.S. Army Veteran in the Afghan War and Medal of Honor Recipient
- January 22
  - Cory Ann Avants, tennis player
  - Scott Cousins, baseball player
  - Shana Cox, American-born British Olympic sprinter
- January 23
  - Shola Adisa-Farrar, singer and actress
  - Donnie Klang, singer
- January 25
  - Brent Celek, football player
  - Hartley Sawyer, actor, producer and writer
  - Michael Trevino, actor
- January 26
  - Emily Afton, singer and actress
  - Sean Cameron, American-born Guyanese footballer
  - Chico Camus, mixed martial artist
  - Edwin Hodge, actor
- January 27 – Danial Ahmed, Pakistani-born cricketer
- January 28 – J. Cole, Hip-Hop musician and record producer
- January 29 – Mikey Hachey, bass player
- January 30
  - Susannah Cahalan, journalist and author
  - Janae Cox, gymnast
  - Kevin Kiley, politician
  - Trae Williams, football player
- January 31
  - Russell Fry, politician
  - Kalomira, Greek-born singer and model

=== February ===
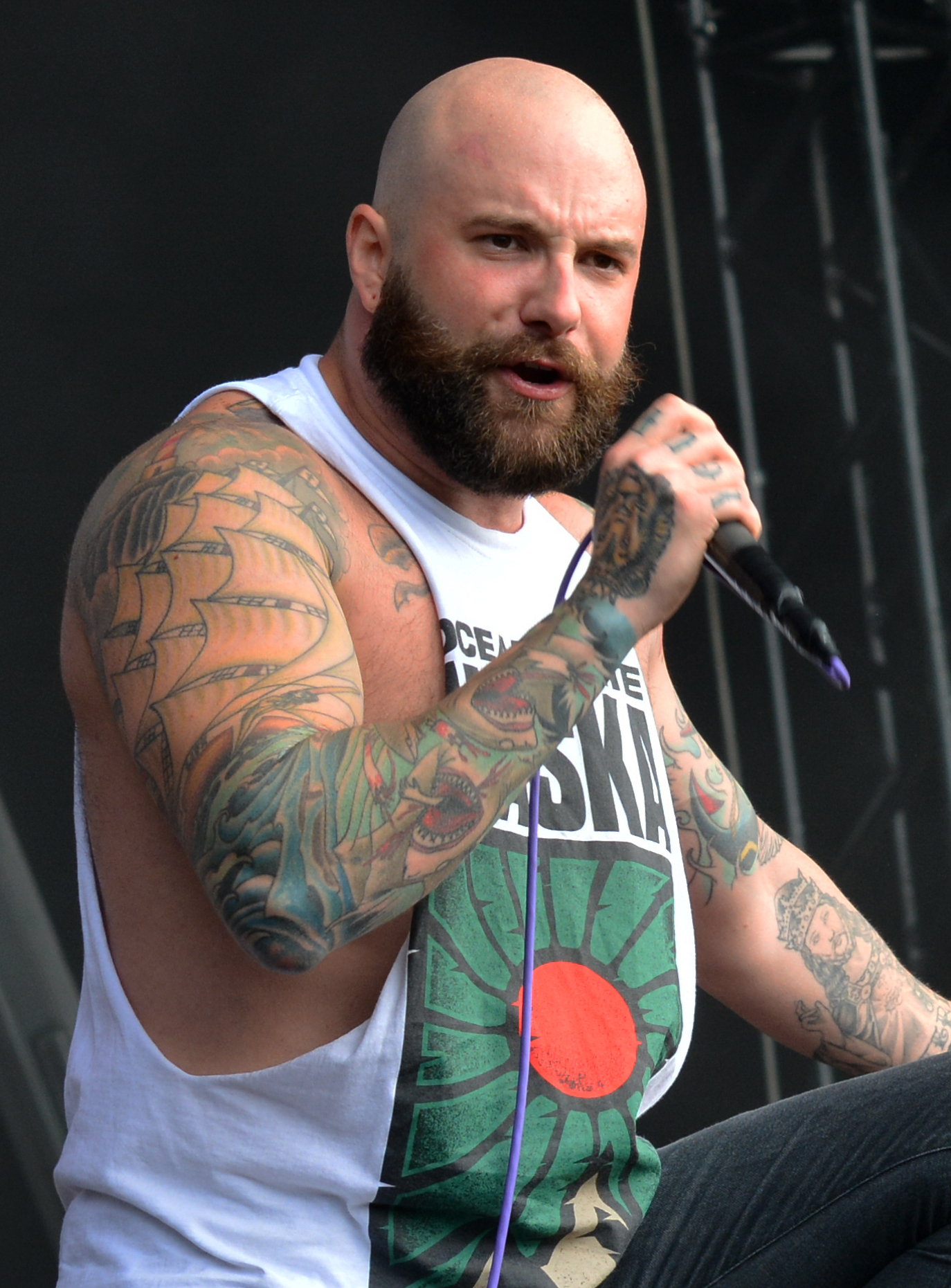
Jake Luhrs

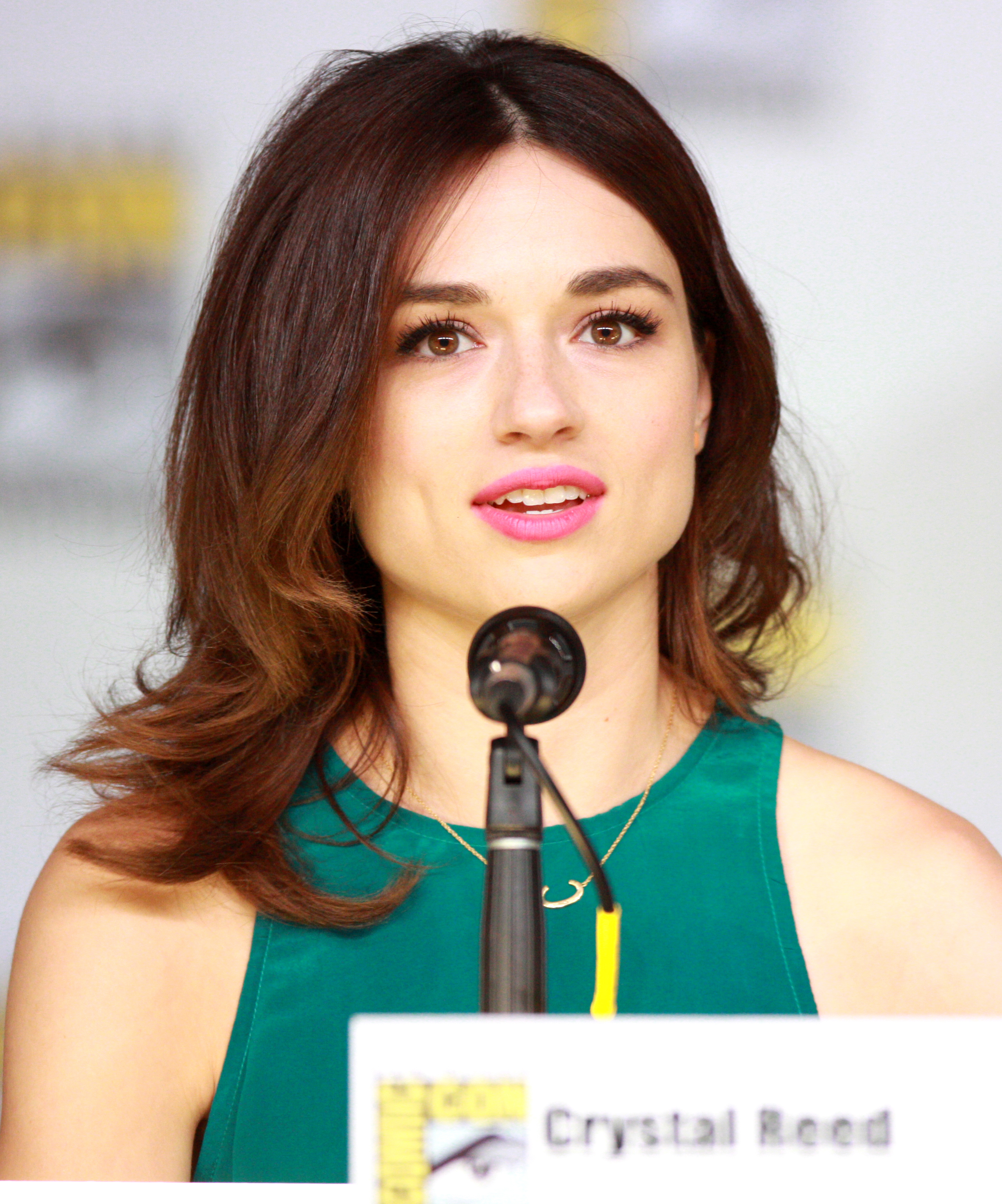
Crystal Reed

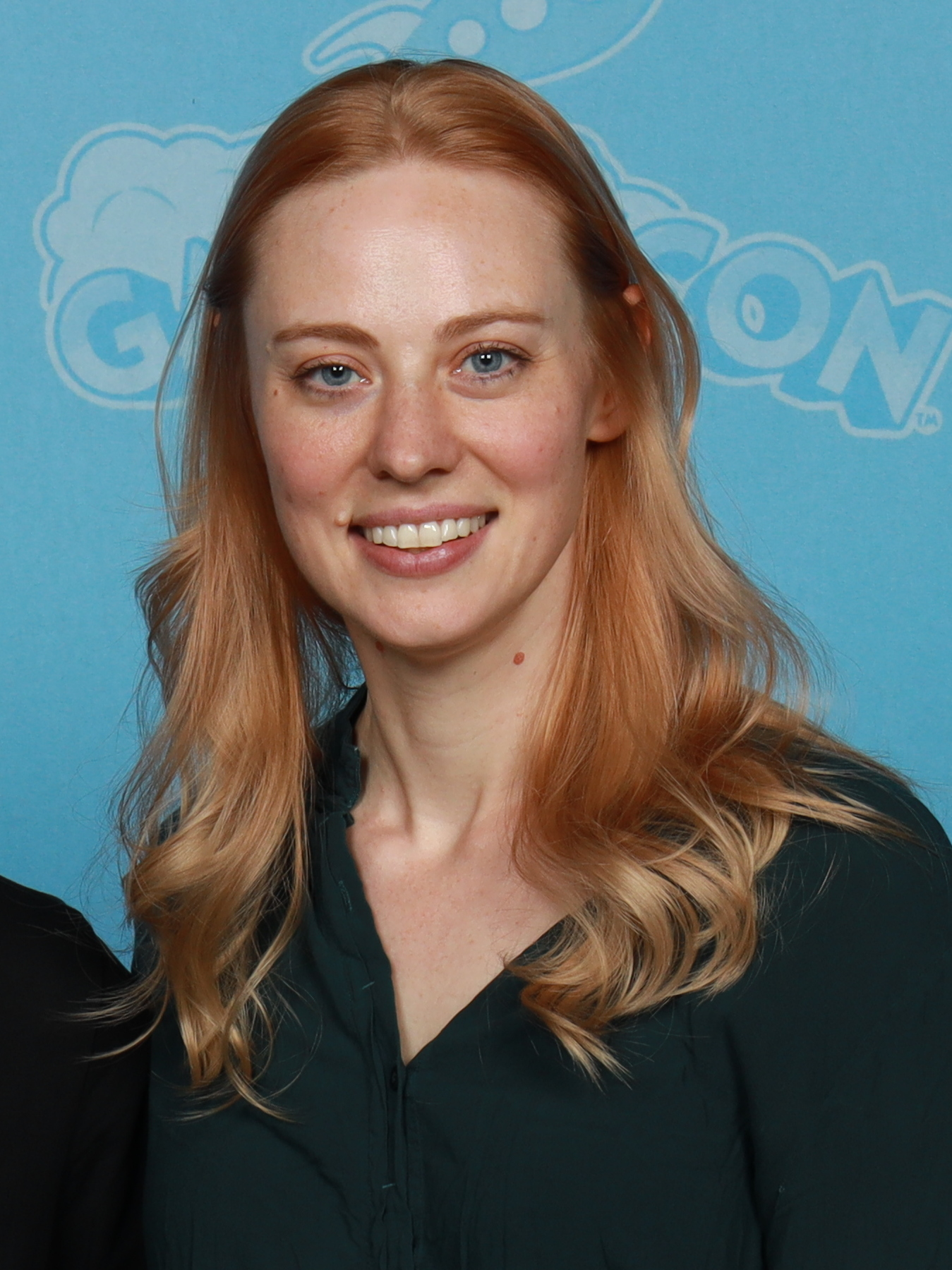
Deborah Ann Woll

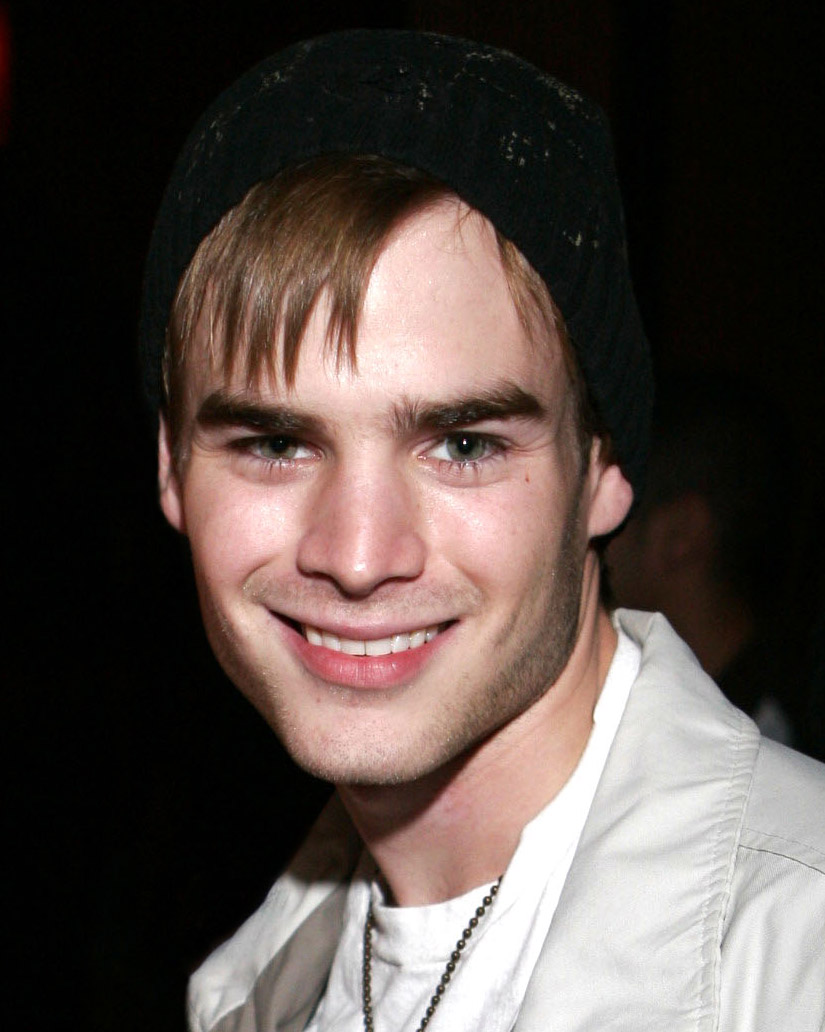
David Gallagher

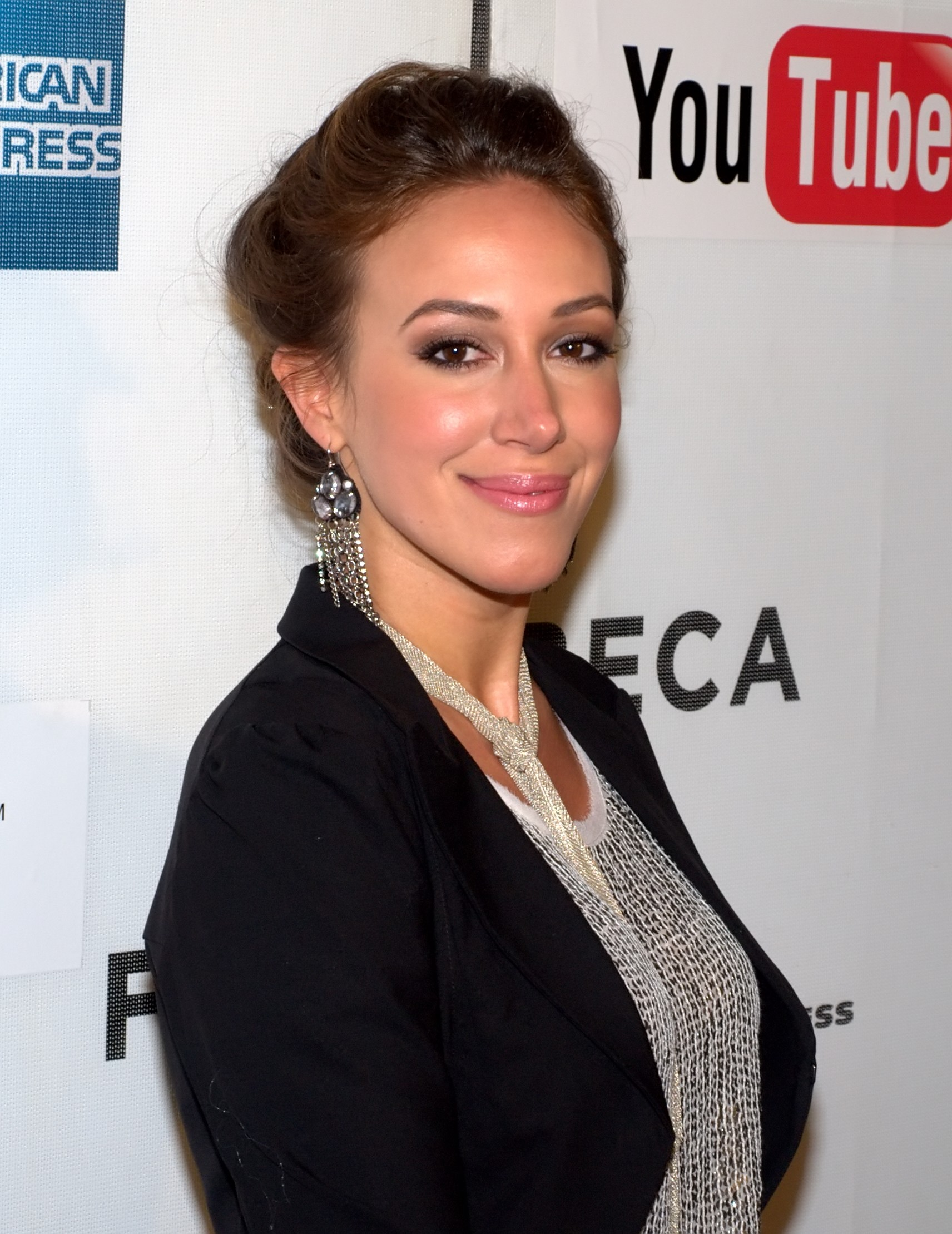
Haylie Duff

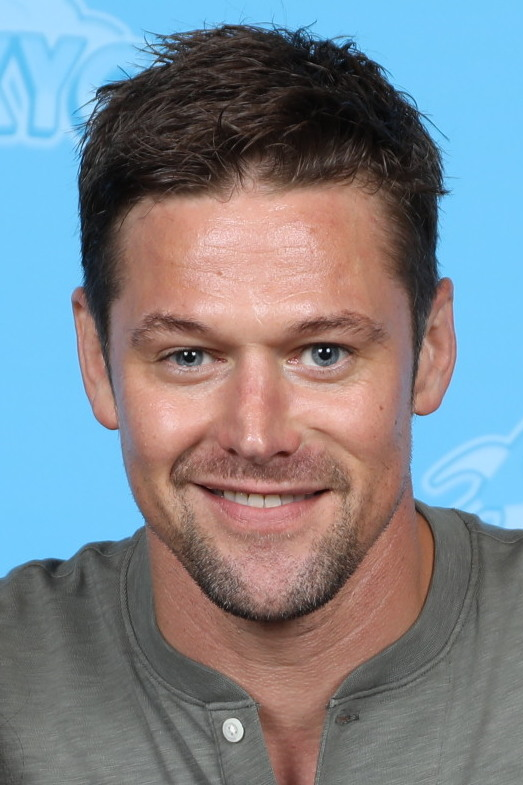
Zach Roerig

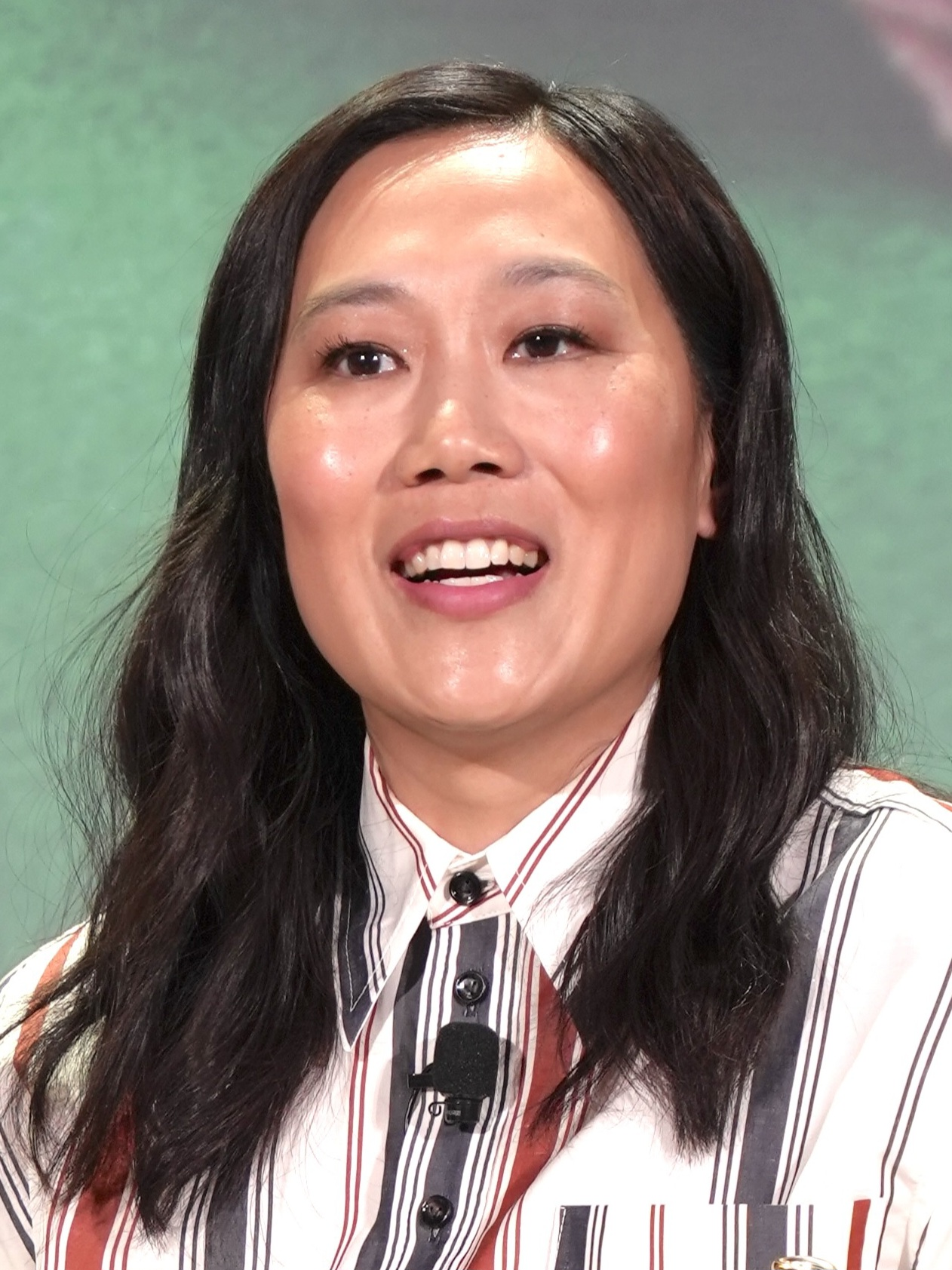
Priscilla Chan

- February 1
  - Sohrab Ahmari, columnist, editor, and author of nonfiction books
  - Alex Clark, YouTuber/animator
  - Colin Curtis, baseball player
- February 2
  - Morris Almond, basketball player
  - Evan Alex Cole, actor
  - Jake Luhrs, singer and frontman for August Burns Red
  - Fontel Mines, football player
- February 4 – Bug Hall, actor
- February 5
  - Laurence Maroney, football player
  - Lindsey Cardinale, singer
- February 6
  - Chester Adams, football player
  - Patrick Carter, football player
  - Kris Humphries, basketball player
  - Crystal Reed, actress
- February 7
  - Derrick Lewis, mixed martial artist
  - Tina Majorino, actress
  - Deborah Ann Woll, actress
- February 8
  - Jeremy Davis, bassist for Paramore (2004–2016)
  - Bob Morris, singer-songwriter and guitarist for The Hush Sound
  - Brian Randle, basketball player and coach
- February 9
  - David Gallagher, actor
  - Rachel Melvin, actress
- February 11
  - Nicholas Altobelli, singer/songwriter
  - William Beckett, singer/songwriter and frontman for The Academy Is...
  - Ben Croft, racquetball player
- February 12 – Cuban-born mixed martial artist
- February 13
  - Jon Applebaum, politician
  - Dan Coleman, basketball player
- February 14
  - Tyler Clippard, baseball player
  - Jake Lacy, actor
- February 15 – Natalie Morales, actress
- February 16
  - Logan Clark, mixed martial artist
  - Stacy Lewis, golfer
- February 17 – Zelda Harris, actress
- February 19
  - Haylie Duff, actress and singer-songwriter
  - Arielle Kebbel, actress
  - Tatanka Means, actor and comedian
- February 20 – TJ Kirk, YouTube personality
- February 21 – Ashley Costello, singer and vocalist for New Years Day
- February 22
  - Fred the Godson, rapper and DJ (d. 2020)
  - Sean Garballey, politician
  - Ryan Hall, mixed martial artist
  - Zach Roerig, actor
- February 23
  - Sam Chelanga, Kenyan-born marathon runner
- February 24
  - Gwen Araujo, murder victim (d. 2002)
  - Priscilla Chan, philanthropist and co-founder and CEO of Meta Platforms
- February 25 – Joakim Noah, basketball player
- February 26 – Shiloh Fernandez, actor
- February 27
  - Debra Arlyn, singer/songwriter and pianist
  - Mohsin Charania, poker player
  - Wendell Chavous, stock car racing driver
  - Nicole Linkletter, model

=== March ===
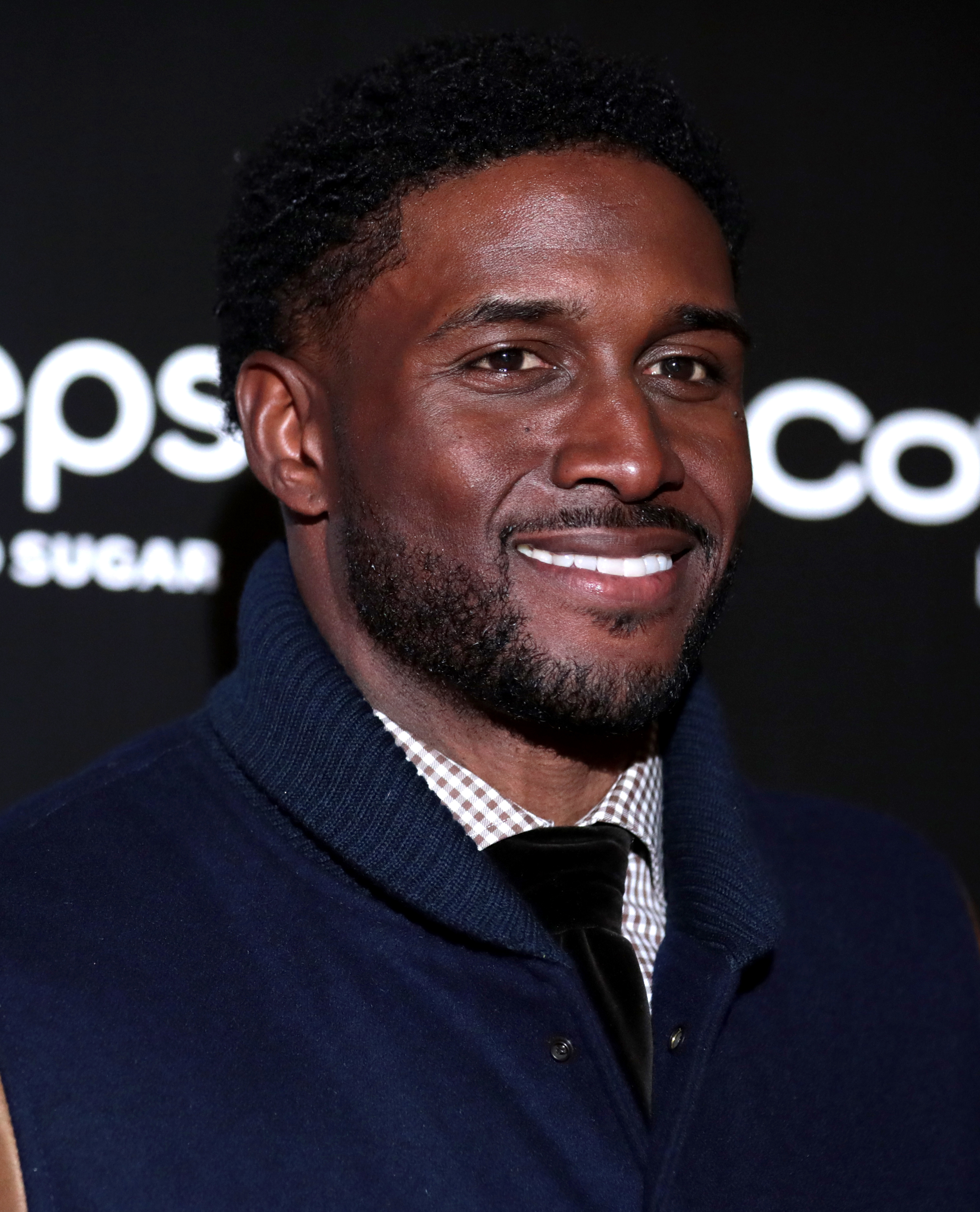
Reggie Bush

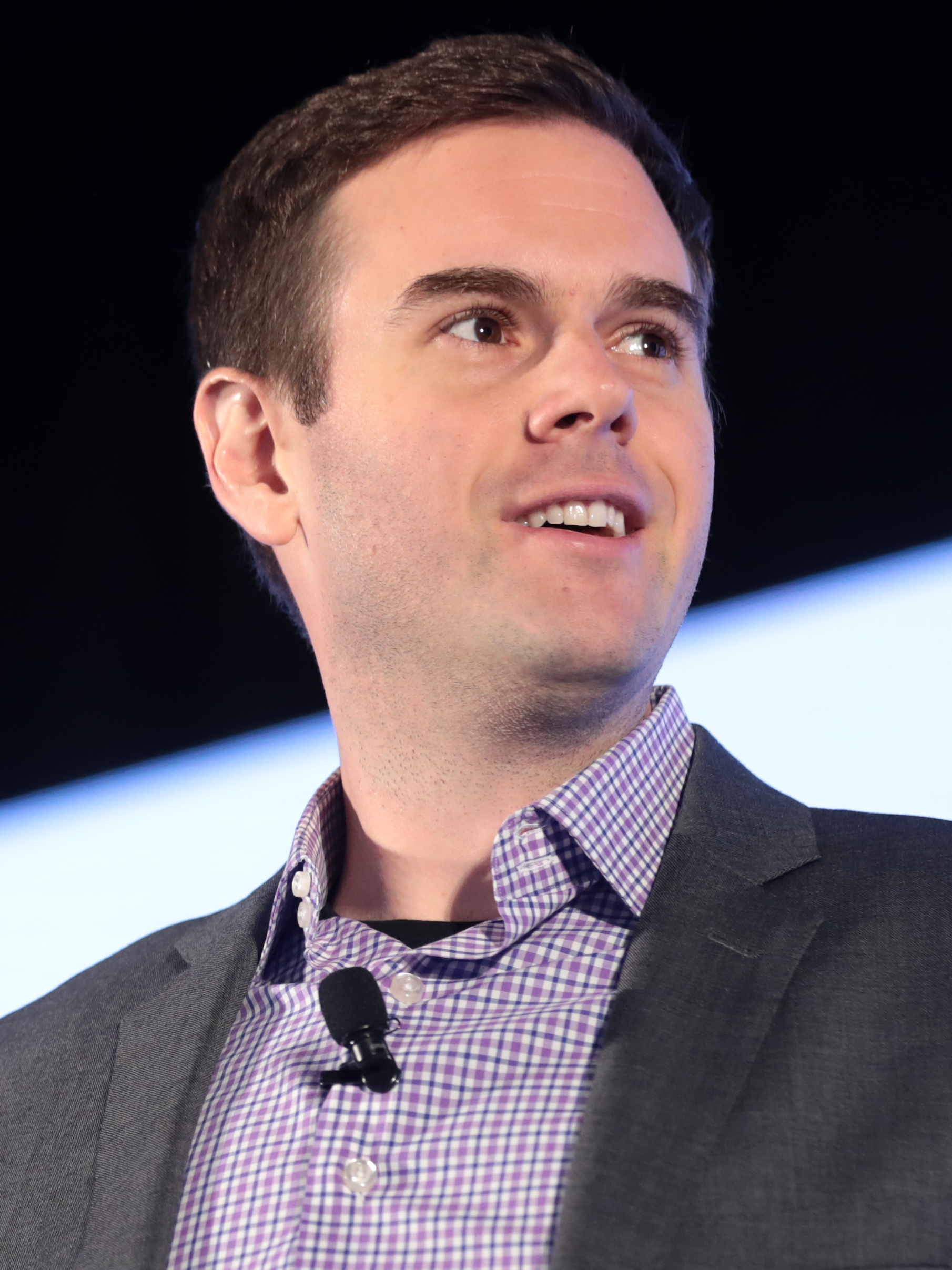
Guy Benson

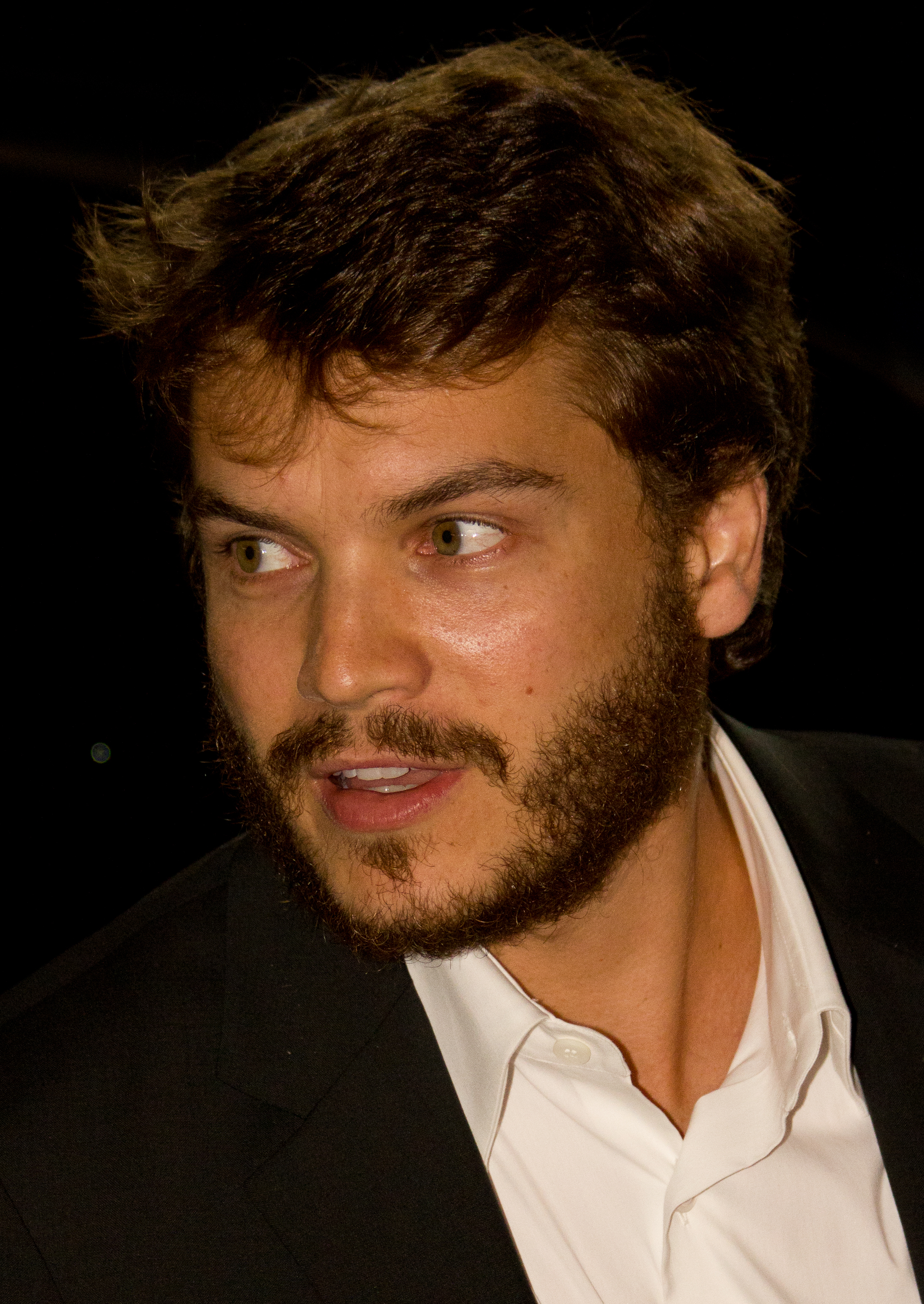
Emile Hirsch

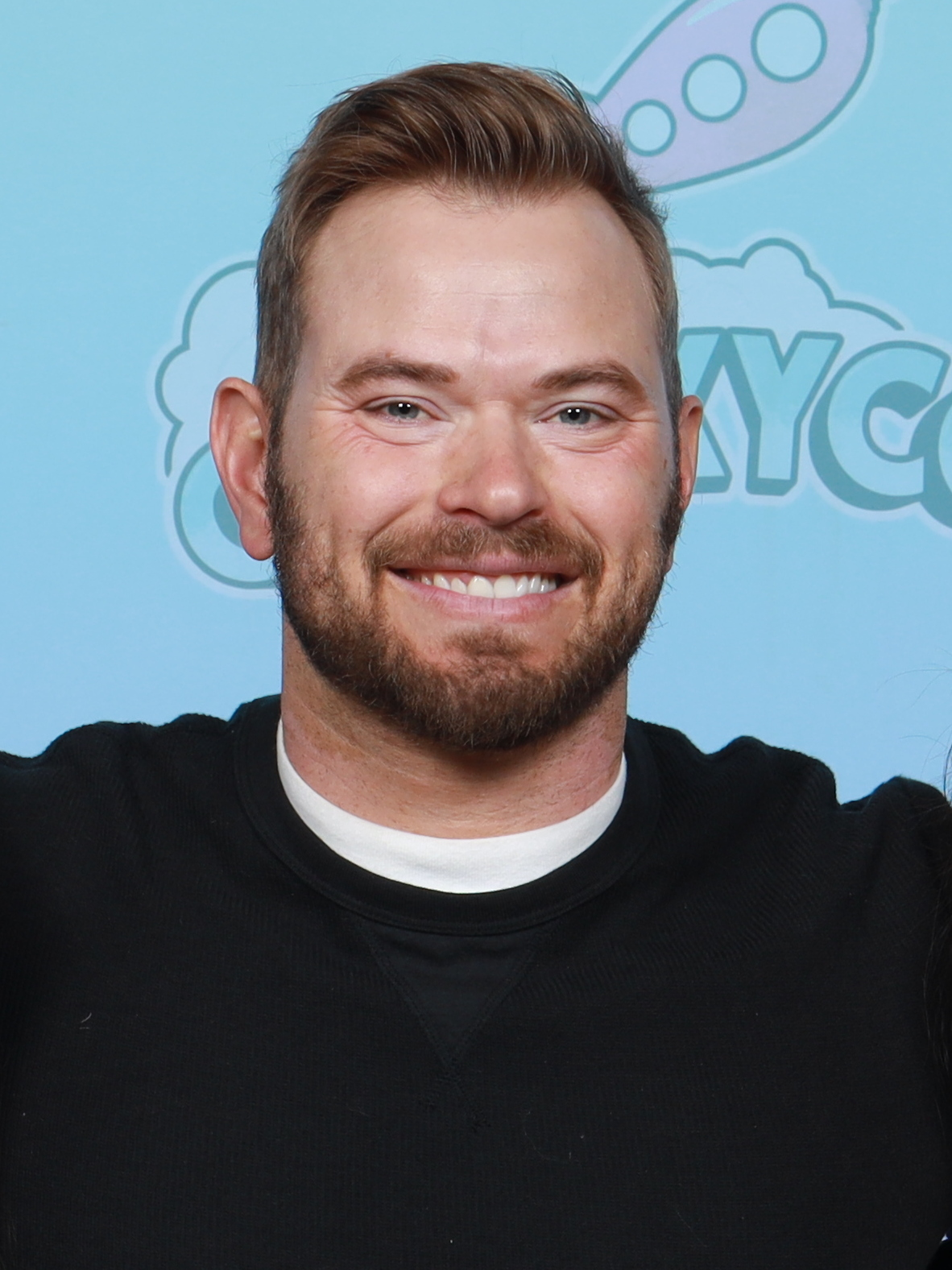
Kellan Lutz

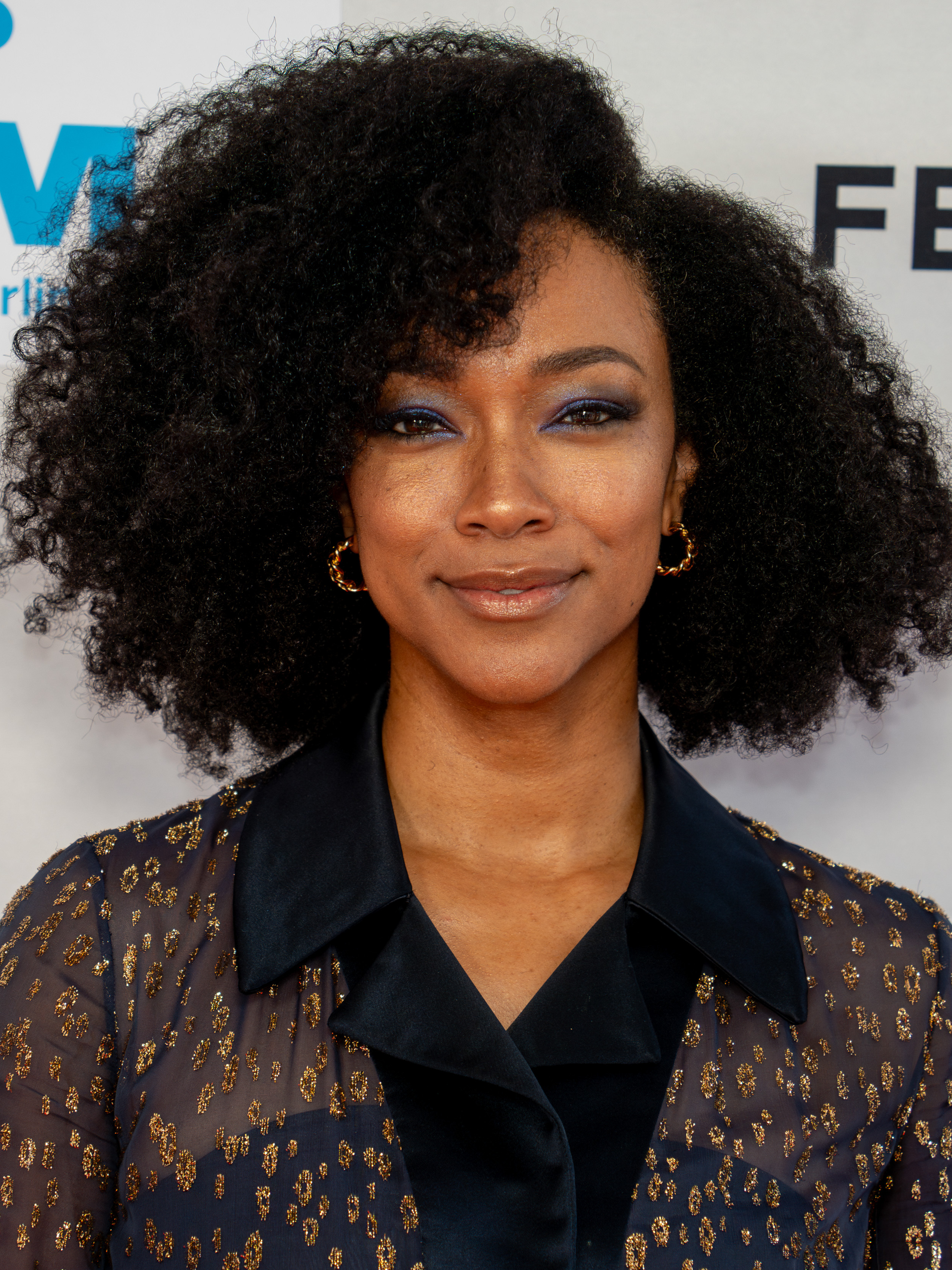
Sonequa Martin-Green

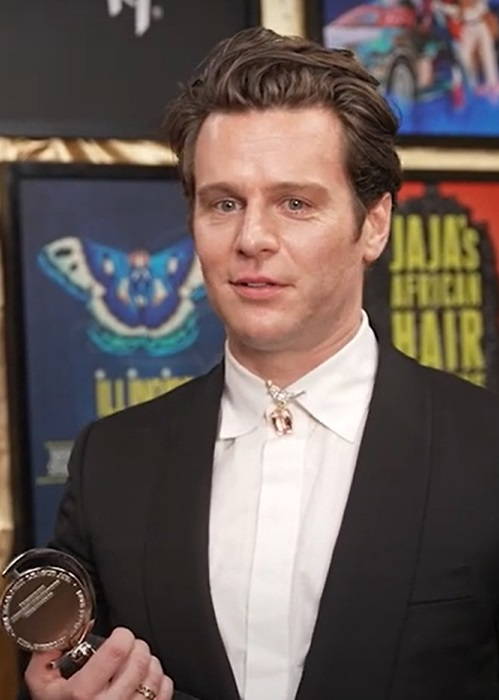
Jonathan Groff

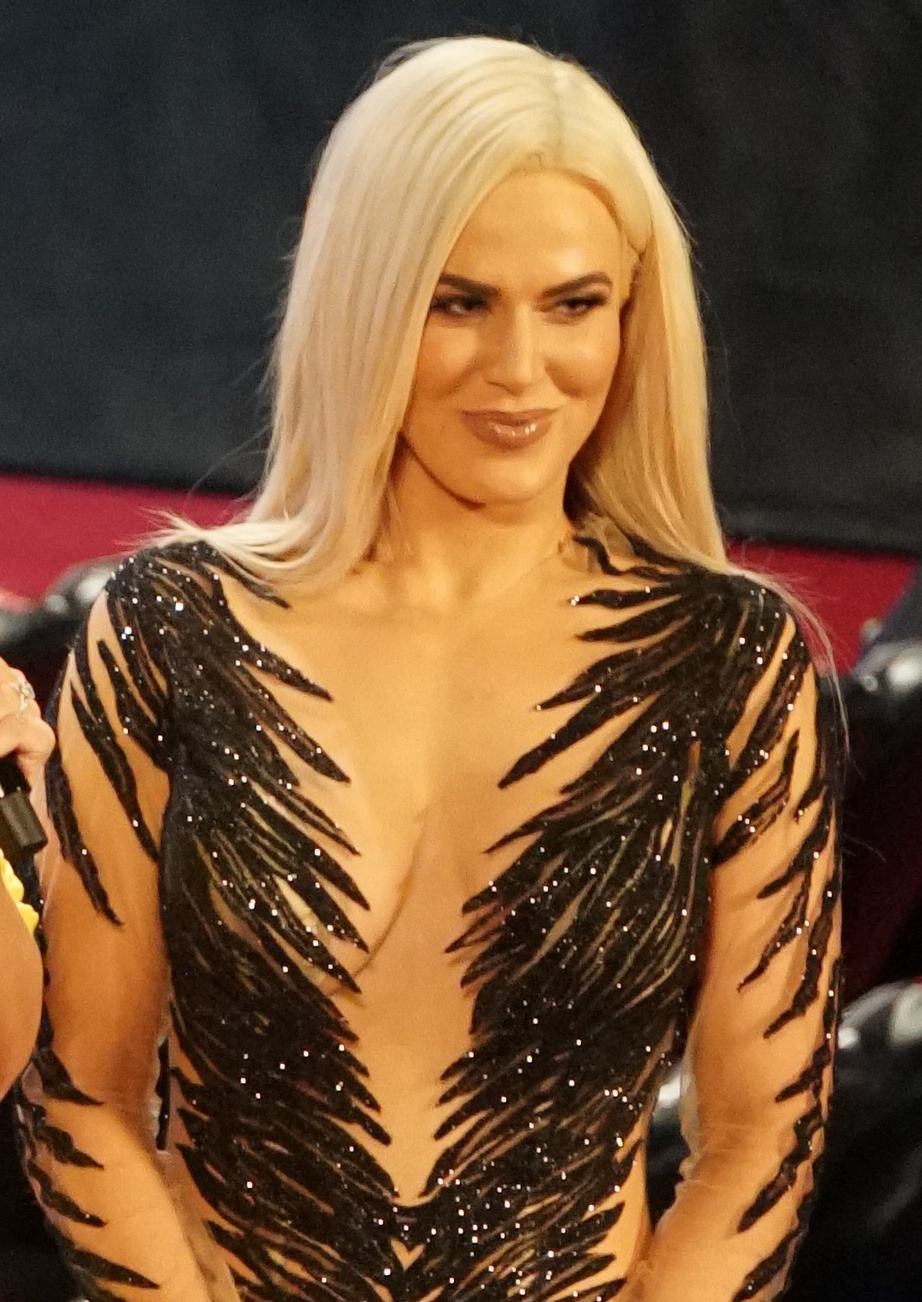
CJ Perry

- March 1
  - Michael Conner Humphreys, actor
  - Cole Sanchez, actor and artist
- March 2
  - Reggie Bush, football player
  - Robert Iler, actor
- March 3
  - Steven Cozza, racing cyclist
  - Toby Turner, Internet personality, actor, comedian and musician
- March 5
  - Martin Casaus, wrestler
  - Jason Cascio, soccer player
  - Buzzy Cohen, recording music industry executive
- March 6
  - Melinda Cooper, boxer
  - Chad Jackson, football player
  - Alaska Thunderfuck, drag queen and television personality
- March 7 – Guy Benson, columnist
- March 9
  - Zach Andrews, basketball player
  - Dominick Cruz, mixed martial artist
  - Rachel Nabors, cartoonist
- March 10
  - Cooper Andrews, actor
  - Luchasaurus, wrestler and television personality
- March 13
  - Emile Hirsch, actor
  - Matt Jackson, pro wrestler
  - Max Jenkins, actor and writer
- March 15
  - Eva Amurri, actress
  - Nick Chambers, comedian
  - Kellan Lutz, fashion model and actor
- March 17
  - Ellie Cachette, investor, philanthropist, and author of Software Agreements for Dummies
  - Lauren Crandall, field hockey player
- March 18 – Kyle Alcorn, Olympic long-distance runner
- March 19 – Esther Agbaje, politician
- March 20
  - Chase Coleman, actor, director, and musician
  - Britton Colquitt, football player
  - Matt Taven, wrestler
- March 21
  - Ryan Callahan, hockey player
  - Adrian Peterson, football player
  - Sonequa Martin-Green, actress and producer
- March 22
  - Mike Jenkins, football player
  - Justin Masterson, baseball player
  - James Wolk, actor
- March 24
  - Blanco Brown, country rapper
  - Jeremy James Kissner, actor
  - CJ Perry, actress, wrestler and model
- March 25
  - Natalia Anciso, contemporary artist and educator
  - Carmen Rasmusen, singer
- March 26
  - Sarah Chang, actress, producer, stunt coordinator, and martial artist
  - Matt Grevers, Olympic swimmer
  - Jonathan Groff, actor and singer
  - Francesca Marie Smith, actress and writer
- March 27
  - Aman Ali, comedian, storyteller, journalist, and writer
  - Blake McIver Ewing, singer/songwriter, actor, model and pianist
- March 28
  - Ian Axel, singer/songwriter
  - Mark Melancon, baseball player
- March 30 – Russell Carter, basketball player
- March 31
  - Jason Chery, football player
  - Lee Cummard, basketball player
  - Peter Porte, actor
  - Jessica Szohr, actress

=== April ===
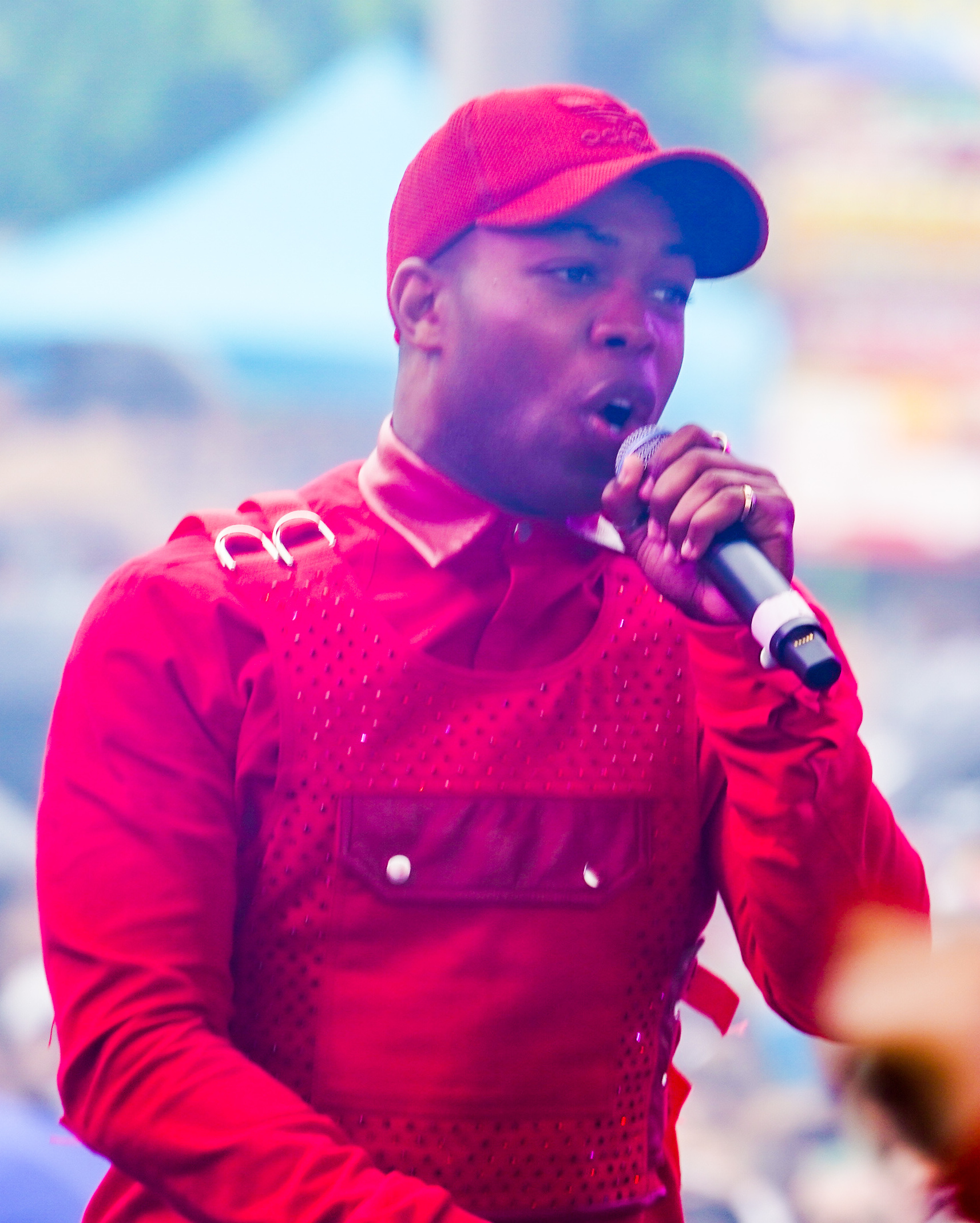
Todrick Hall

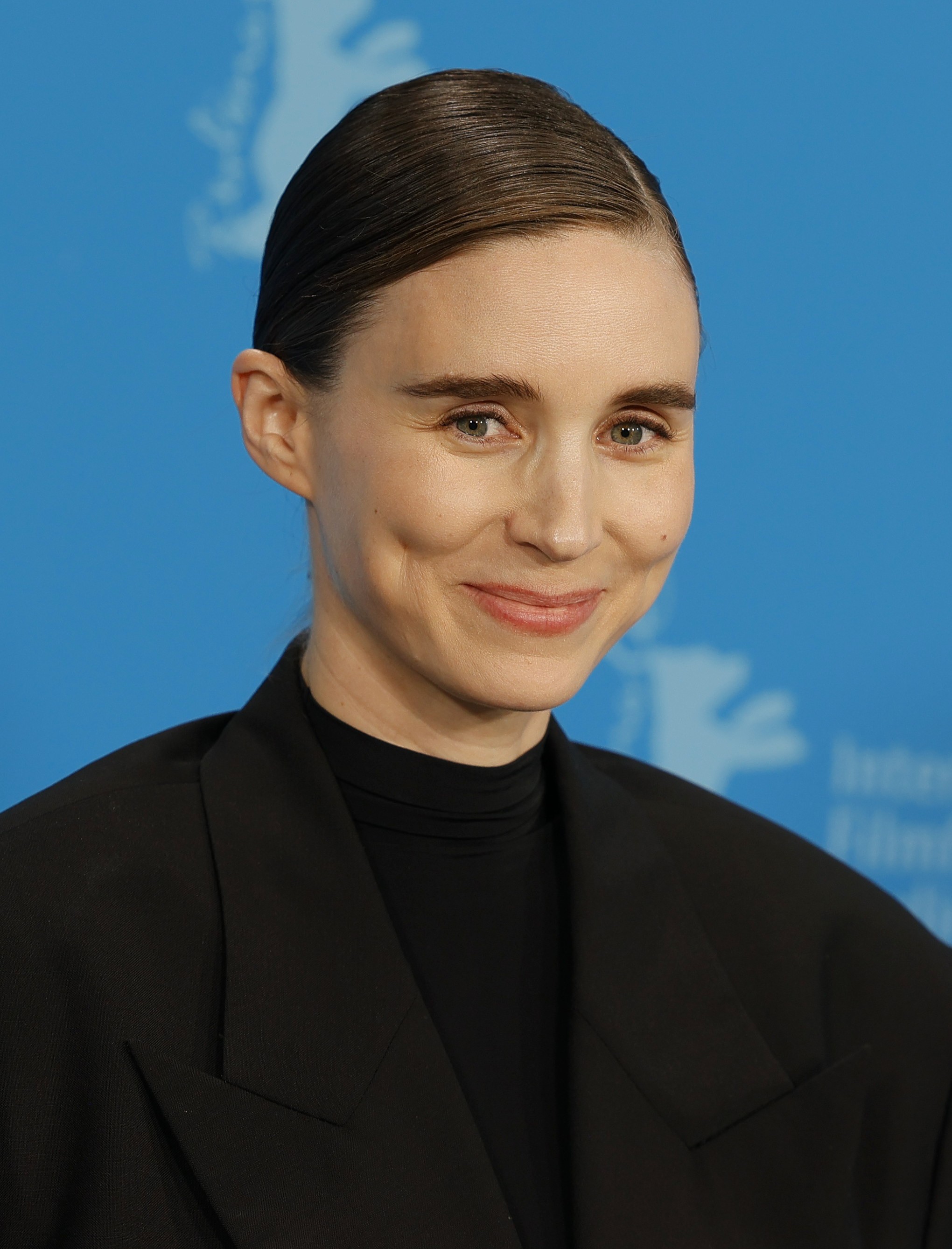
Rooney Mara

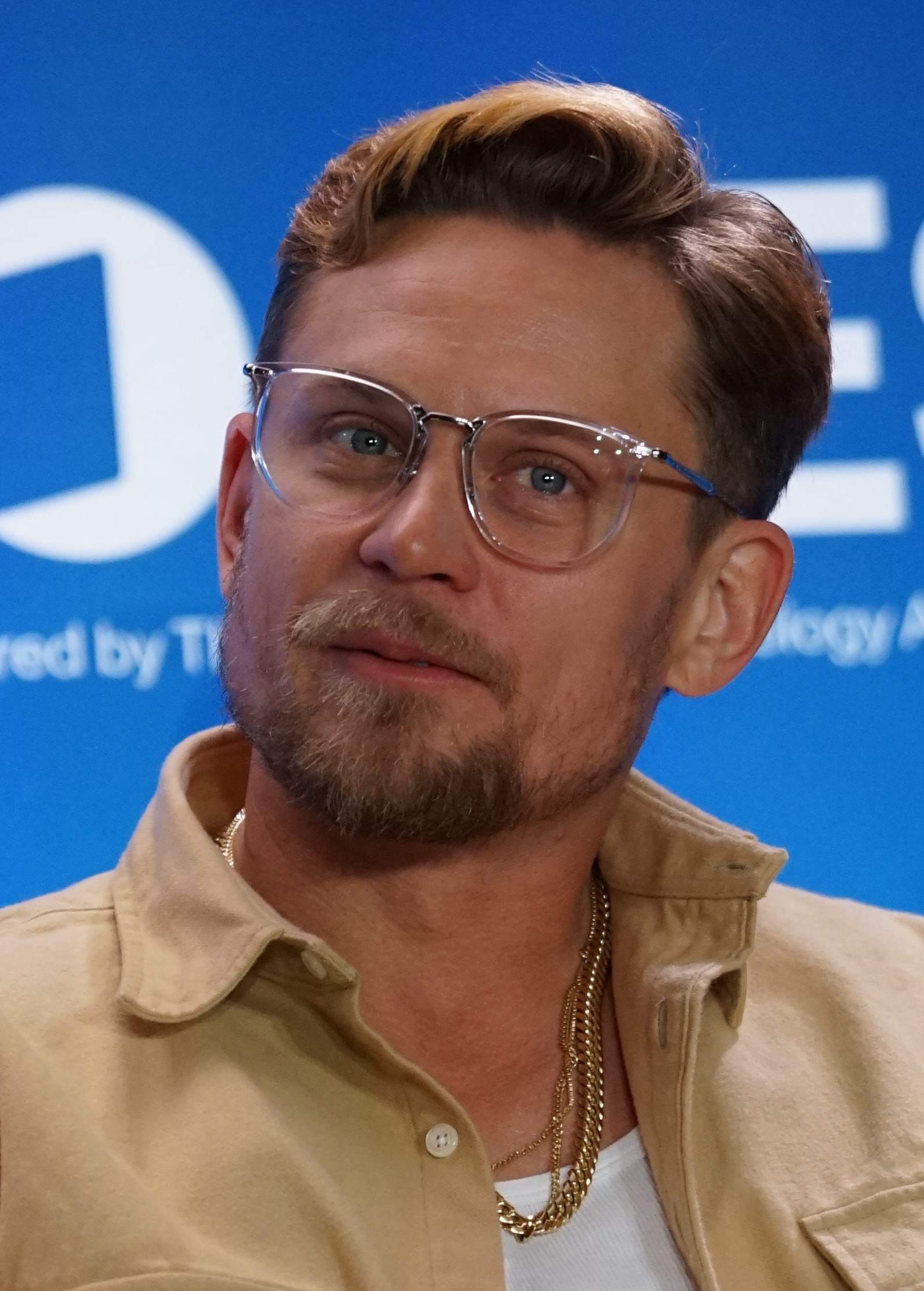
Billy Magnussen

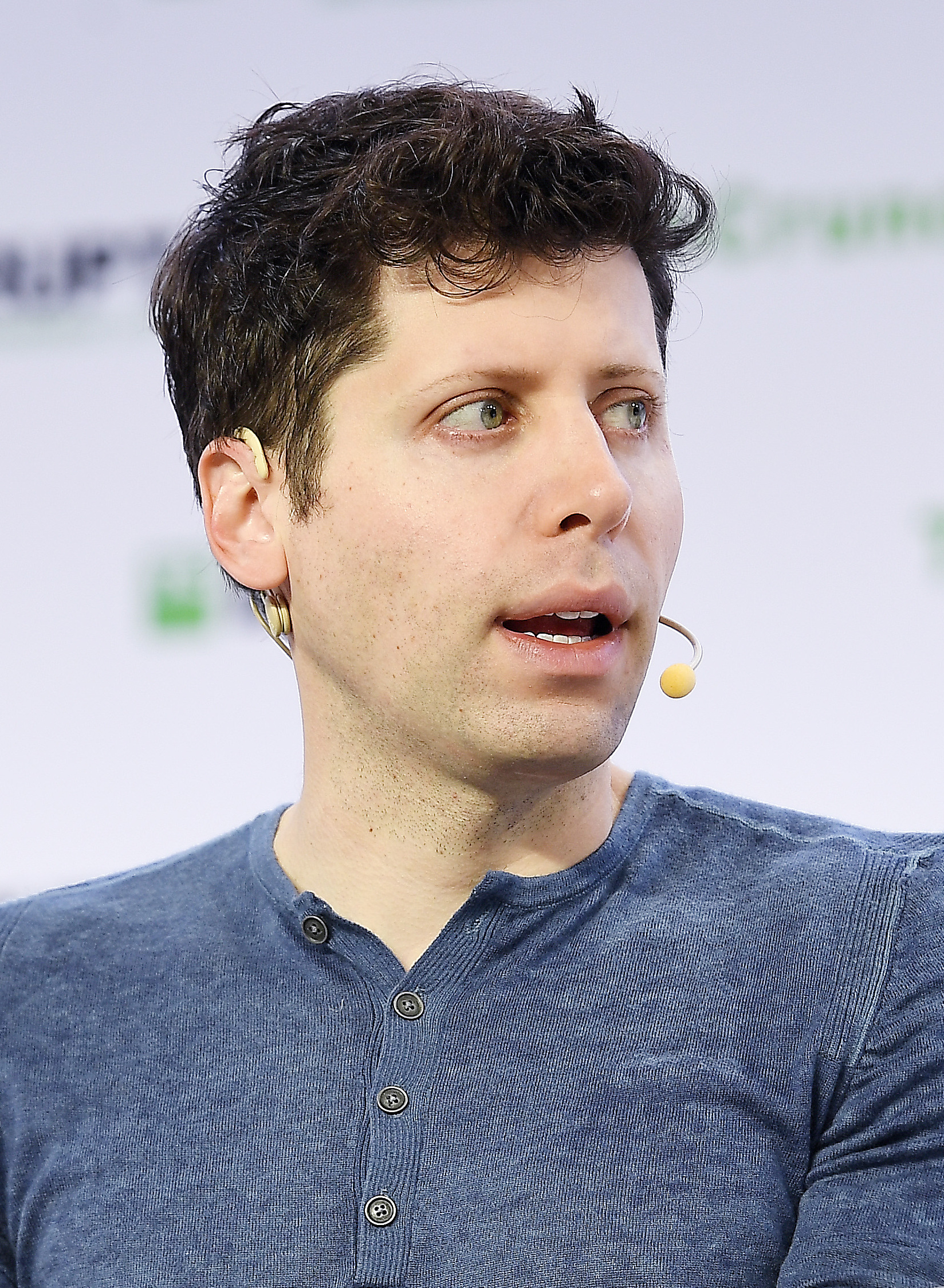
Sam Altman

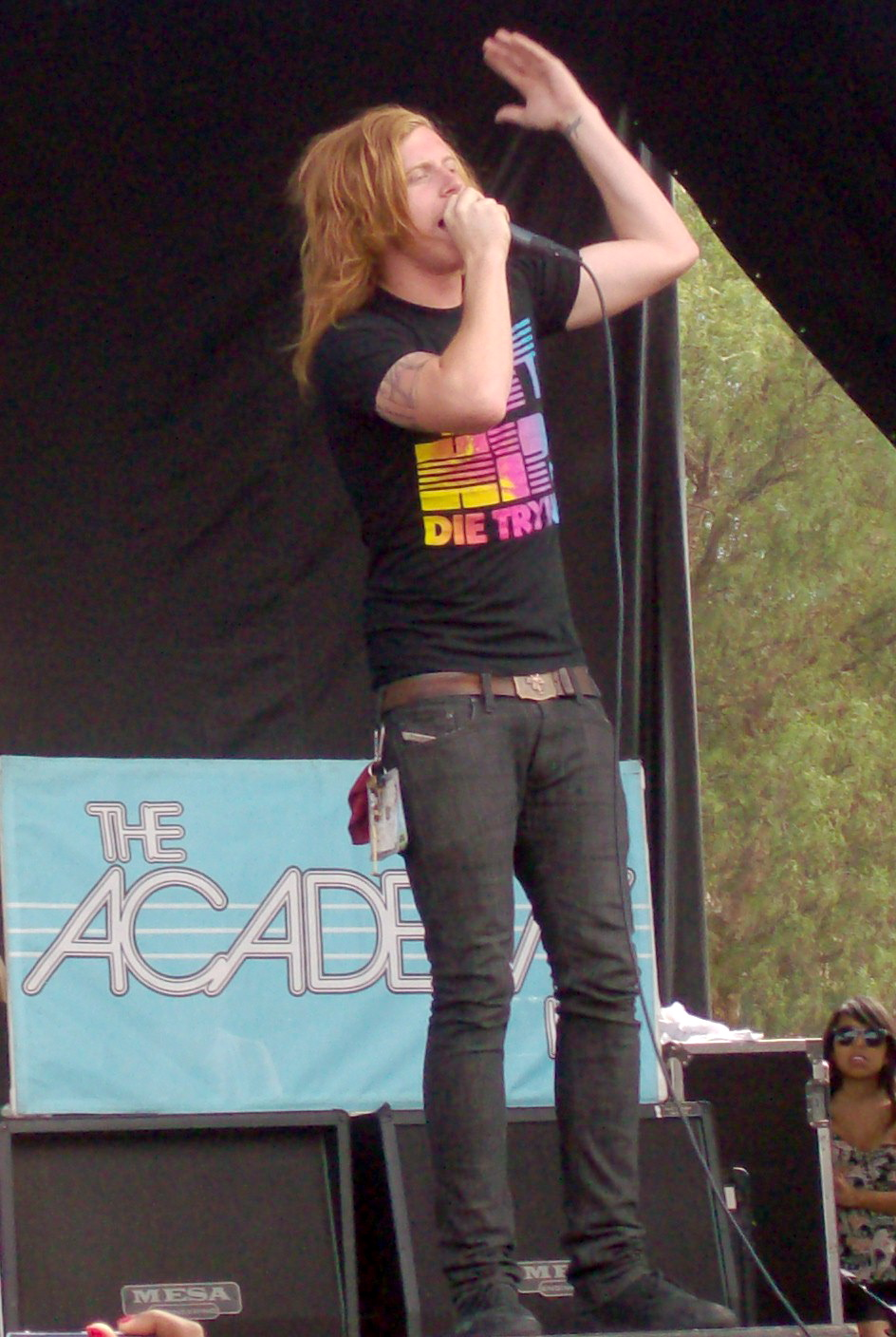
Travis Clark

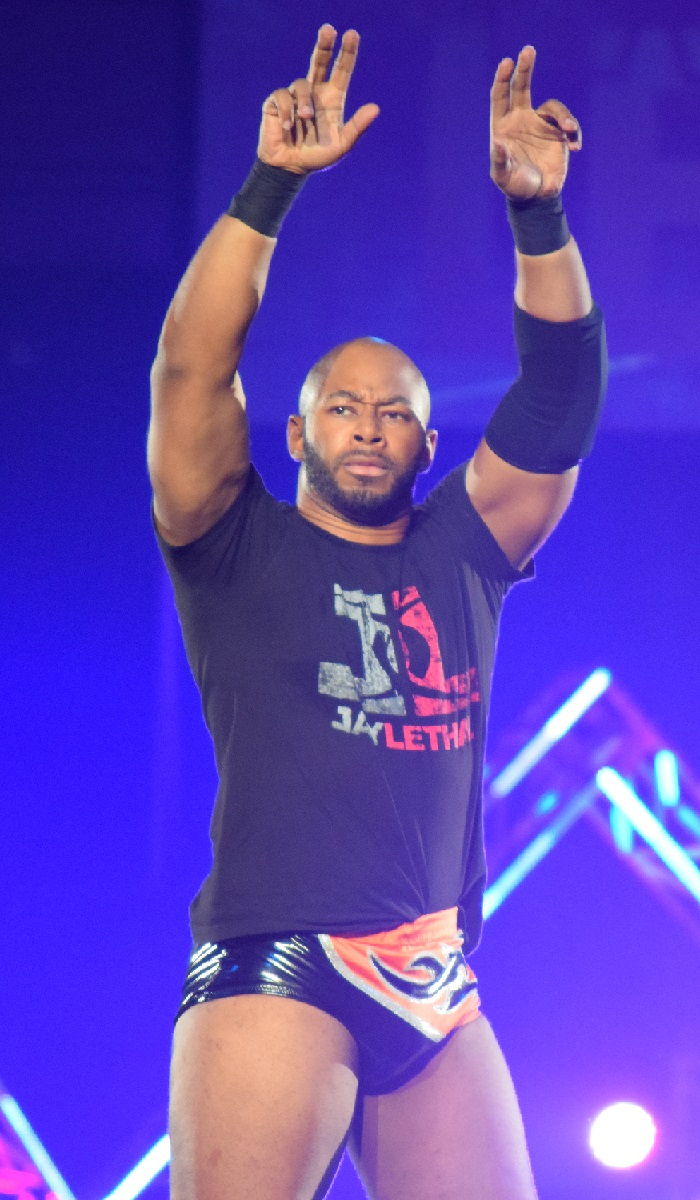
Jay Lethal

- April 1
  - Ryan A. Conklin, television personality and U.S. Army Sergeant
  - Daniel Murphy, baseball player
  - Josh Zuckerman, actor
- April 2
  - Matthew Antoine, Olympic skeleton racer
  - Drew Atchison, football player
- April 3 – Gerald Coleman, ice hockey player
- April 4 – Todrick Hall, singer-songwriter, actor, director, choreographer and YouTuber
- April 5 – Lastings Milledge, baseball player
- April 6 – Sinqua Walls, basketball player and actor
- April 7 – Joe Cook, basketball coach
- April 8 – Matt Antonelli, baseball player
- April 9 – David Robertson, baseball player
- April 10
  - Barkhad Abdi, Somalian-born actor
  - Kyle Clement, football player
- April 12
  - Thomas Albert, politician
  - Brennan Boesch, baseball player
- April 13
  - Carmen Carrera, model
  - Jon Connor, rapper and record producer
- April 15
  - Andre Caldwell, football player
  - Chris Cates, baseball player
  - John Danks, baseball player
  - Aaron Laffey, baseball player
- April 16
  - Matt Alonzo, director, video editor, and filmmaker
  - Nate Diaz, mixed martial artist
  - Sam Hyde, internet comedian
- April 17
  - Jonathan Cheever, Olympic snowboarder
  - Victoria Cisneros, boxer
  - Rooney Mara, actress
- April 19 – Zack Conroy, actor
- April 20
  - Brian Myers, wrestler
  - Billy Magnussen, actor
- April 21 – Rachel Lindsay, media personality
- April 22
  - Sam Altman, entrepreneur, investor, programmer, blogger, CEO of OpenAI, and former president of Y Combinator
  - Danny Cepero, soccer player
- April 23
  - Blythe Auffarth, actress
  - Warren Carter, basketball player
  - Snootie Wild, rapper (d. 2022)
- April 24 – Travis Clark, singer/songwriter, guitarist, and frontman for We the Kings
- April 26
  - Matt Clackson, Canadian-born hockey player
  - Tiffany Jackson, basketball player and coach (d. 2022)
  - Bre Scullark, fashion model and actress
- April 27 – Jamie Gray Hyder, actress and model
- April 28 – Brandon Baker, actor
- April 29
  - Julia Clukey, Olympic luger
  - Jay Lethal, wrestler

=== May ===
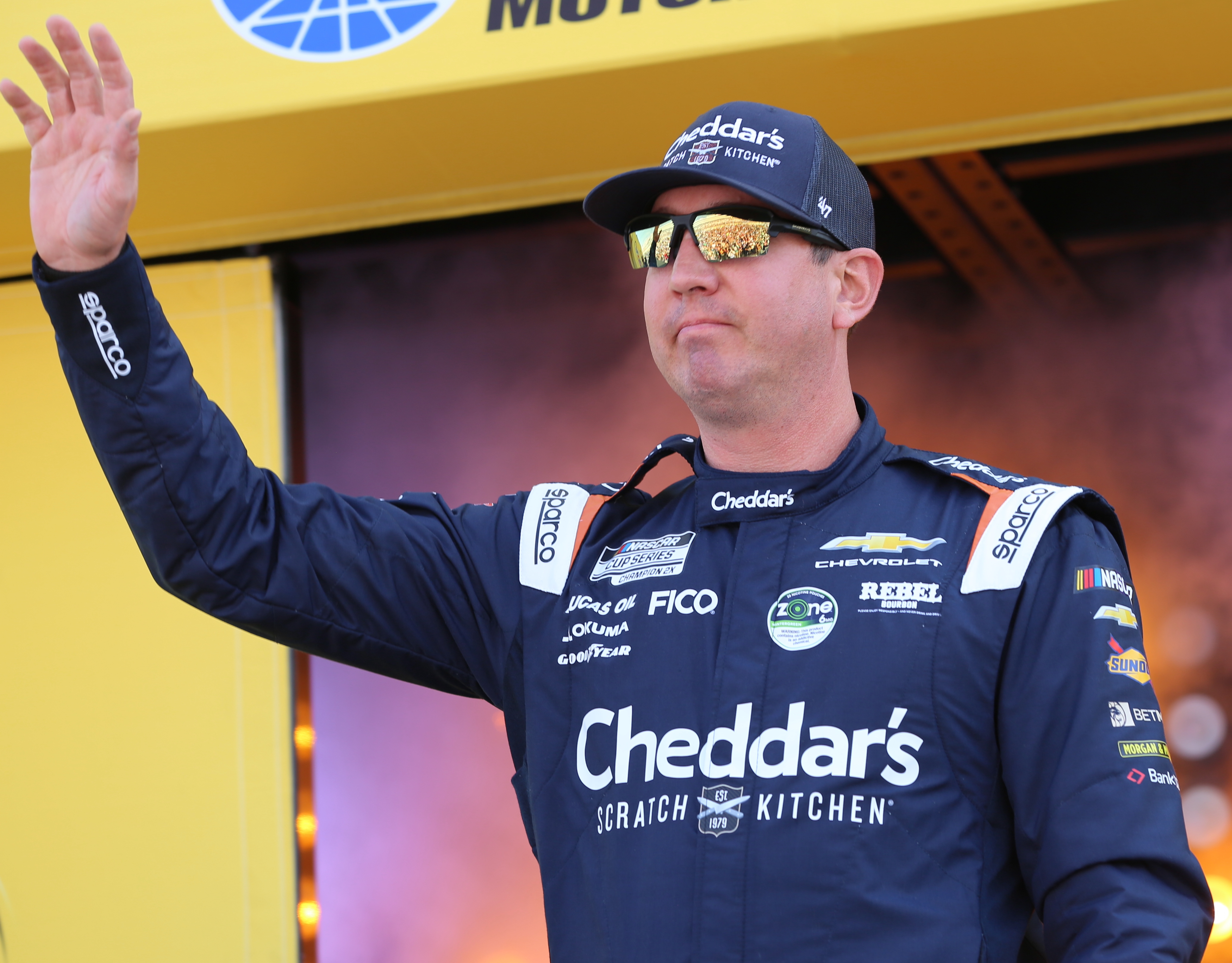
Kyle Busch

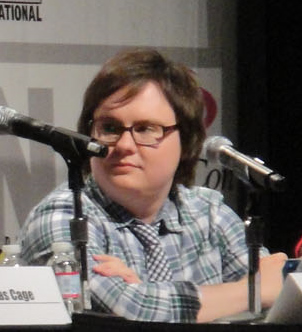
Clark Duke

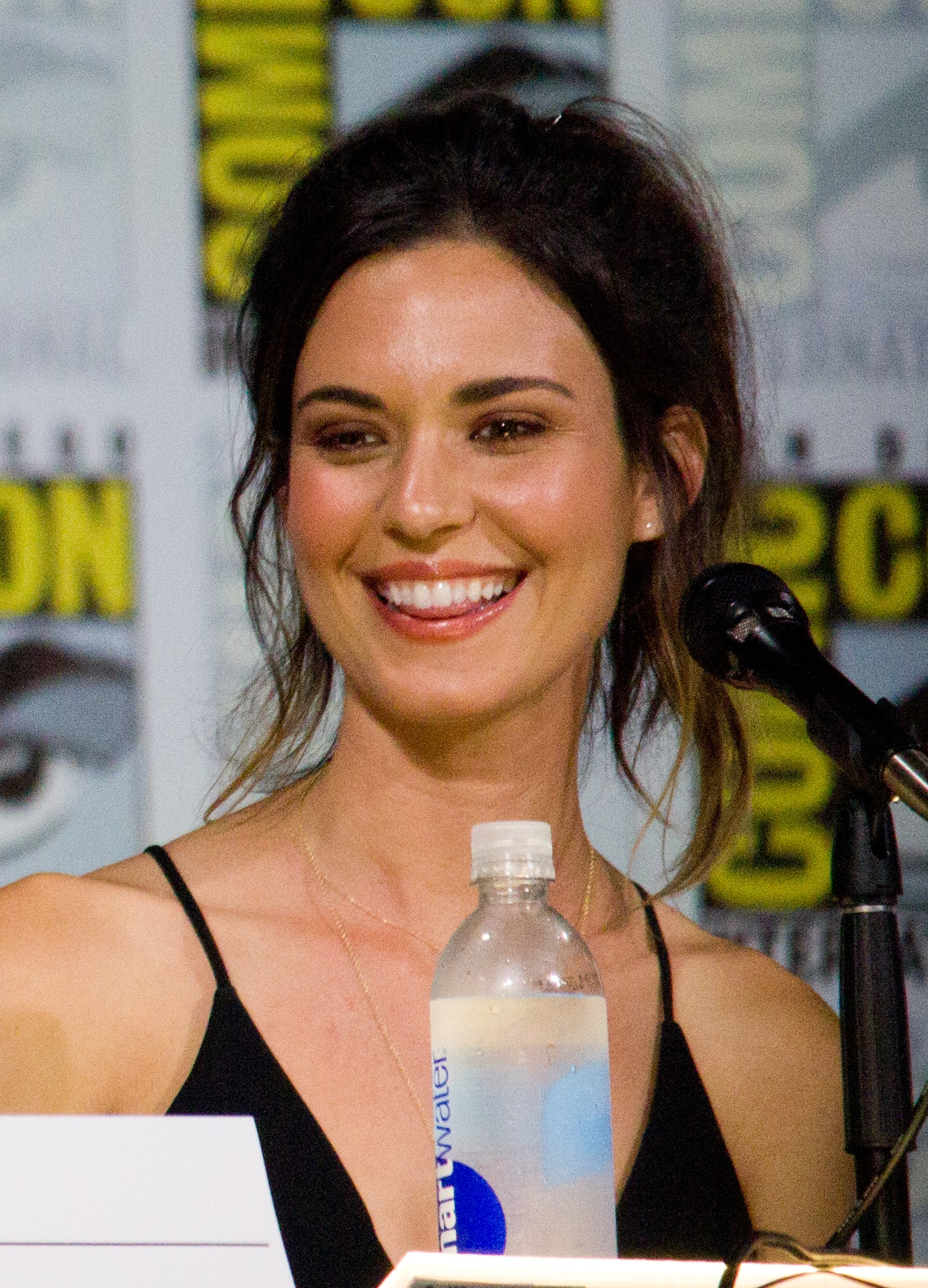
Odette Annable

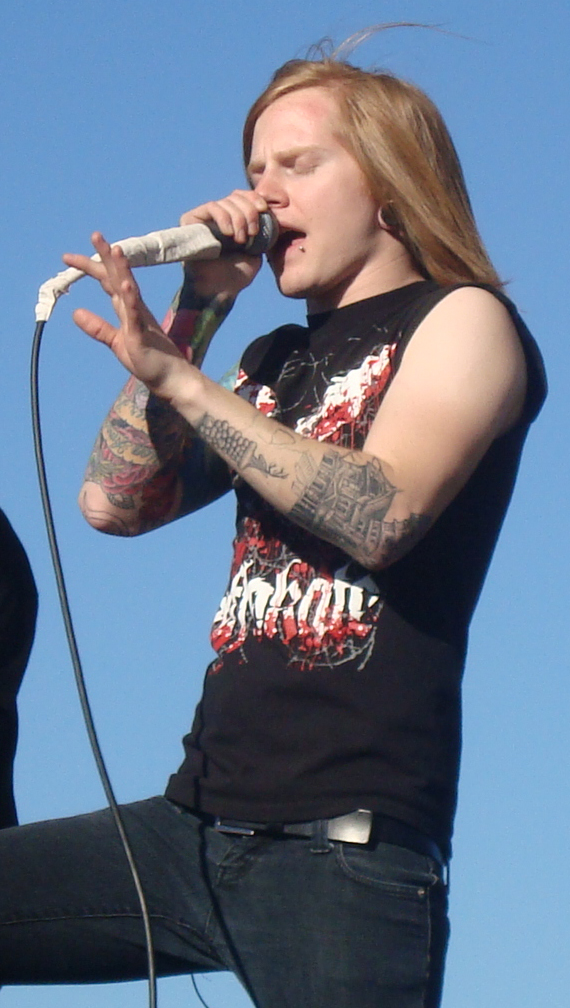
Michael Jagmin

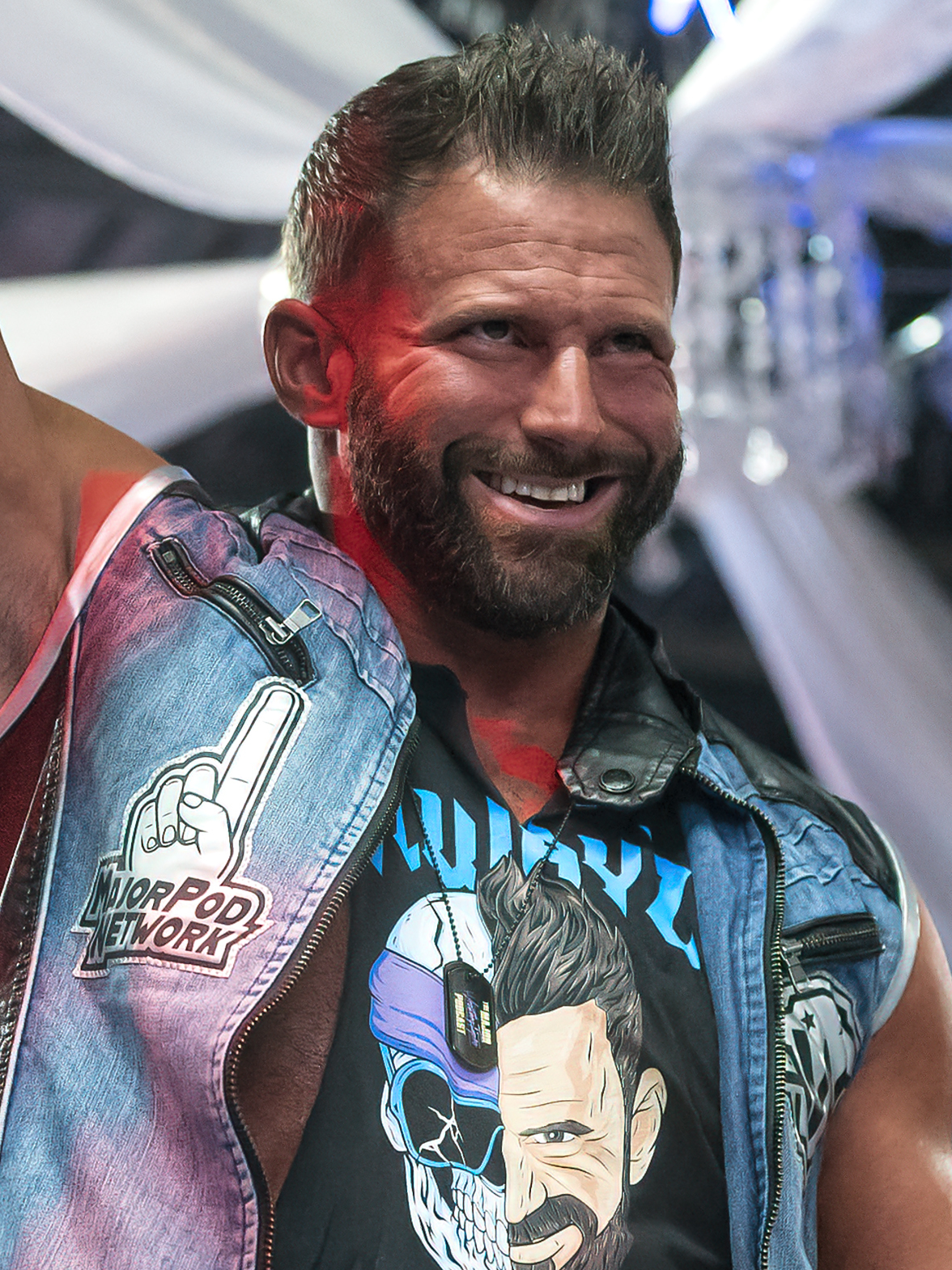
Matt Cardona

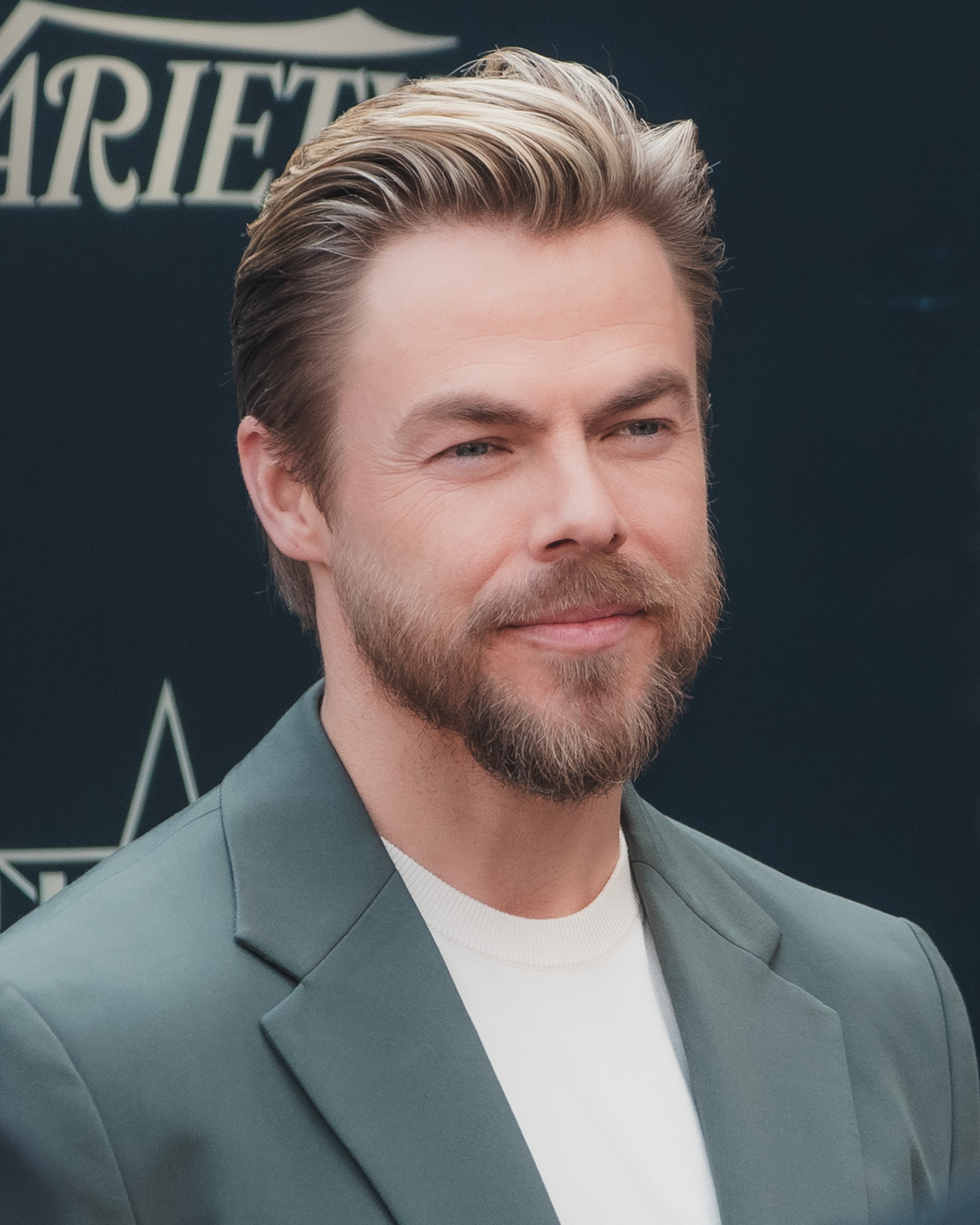
Derek Hough

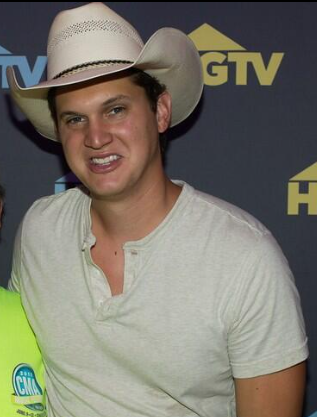
Jon Pardi

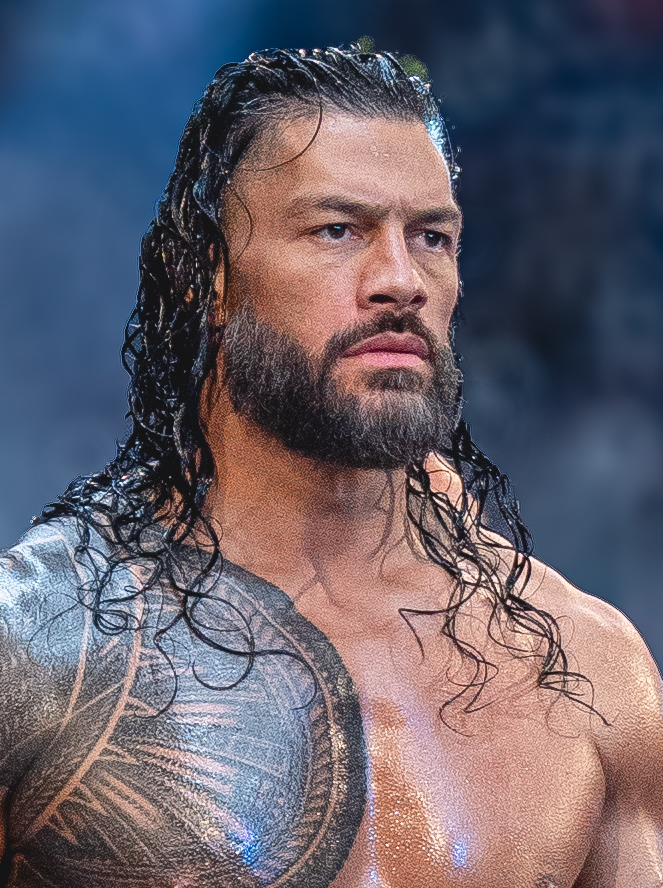
Roman Reigns

- May 2
  - Kyle Busch, racing driver (d. 2026)
  - Sarah Hughes, Olympic figure skater
- May 3
  - Becky Chambers, writer
  - Meagan Tandy, actress and model
- May 4
  - Bo McCalebb, American-born Macedonian basketball player
  - Anthony Federov, Ukrainian-born singer
- May 5
  - Clark Duke, actor, comedian, and director
  - P. J. Tucker, basketball player
- May 6
  - Cori Callahan, soccer player and photographer
  - Ian McGinty, comic book writer and artist (d. 2023)
  - Chris Paul, basketball player
- May 7 – Andrew Carroll, hockey player (d. 2018)
- May 8
  - Tommaso Ciampa, wrestler
  - Nick Cunningham, Olympic bobsledder
  - Usama Young, football player
- May 9
  - Audrina Patridge, television personality and actress
  - Chris Zylka, actor and model
- May 10 – Odette Annable, actress
- May 11
  - Matt Giraud, singer, pianist and keyboardist
  - Shane Steichen, football coach
- May 12
  - Tally Hall, soccer player
  - Michael Jagmin, singer and frontman for A Skylit Drive
- May 13 – Victor Agosto, anti-war activist and former U.S. Army private
- May 14
  - Matt Cardona, wrestler
  - Lina Esco, actress, producer and activist
  - Dustin Lynch, Country singer/songwriter
- May 15
  - Seth Adams, football player
  - Jim Adduci, baseball player
  - Ian Campbell, football player
  - Jazmin Chaudhry, Bangladeshi-born actress
- May 16
  - Ánh Minh, Vietnamese-born singer
  - Sal Caccavale, soccer player
  - Andrew Keenan-Bolger, actor, writer and director
- May 17
  - Derek Hough, dancer, choreographer, musician and six-time Winner of Dancing with the Stars
  - Matt Ryan, football player
- May 18
  - Francesca Battistelli, Christian singer/songwriter
  - Andrew Carpenter, baseball player
- May 19 – Chinonye Chukwu, Nigerian-born director
- May 20
  - Caitlin Cahow, ice hockey player
  - Jon Pardi, country singer/songwriter
- May 21
  - Aung La Nsang, Burmese-born mixed martial artist
  - Cameron Van Hoy, actor, producer and writer
- May 22
  - T. J. Carter, basketball player
  - Chris Salvatore, actor, singer/songwriter, model and gay rights activist
  - Aakash Gandhi, composer, pianist, songwriter, and entrepreneur
- May 23 – Lindsey Anderson, Olympic middle-distance runner
- May 24 – John Vigilante, hockey player and coach (d. 2018)
- May 25
  - Lauren Frost, actress and singer
  - Kevin O'Connell, football player and coach
  - Roman Reigns, wrestler
- May 28
  - Kaylin Andres, writer, artist, and fashion designer (d. 2016)
  - Colbie Caillat, musician
  - Billy Flynn, actor and producer
  - Emily Wilson, actress
- May 29
  - Blake Foster, actor and martial artist
  - Heather Heyer, protestor who died in Charlottesville during the Unite the Right rally (d. 2017)
  - Shwayze, rapper
- May 30
  - Niki Cross, soccer player
  - Turk McBride, football player
- May 31
  - Navene Koperweis, metal drummer

=== June ===
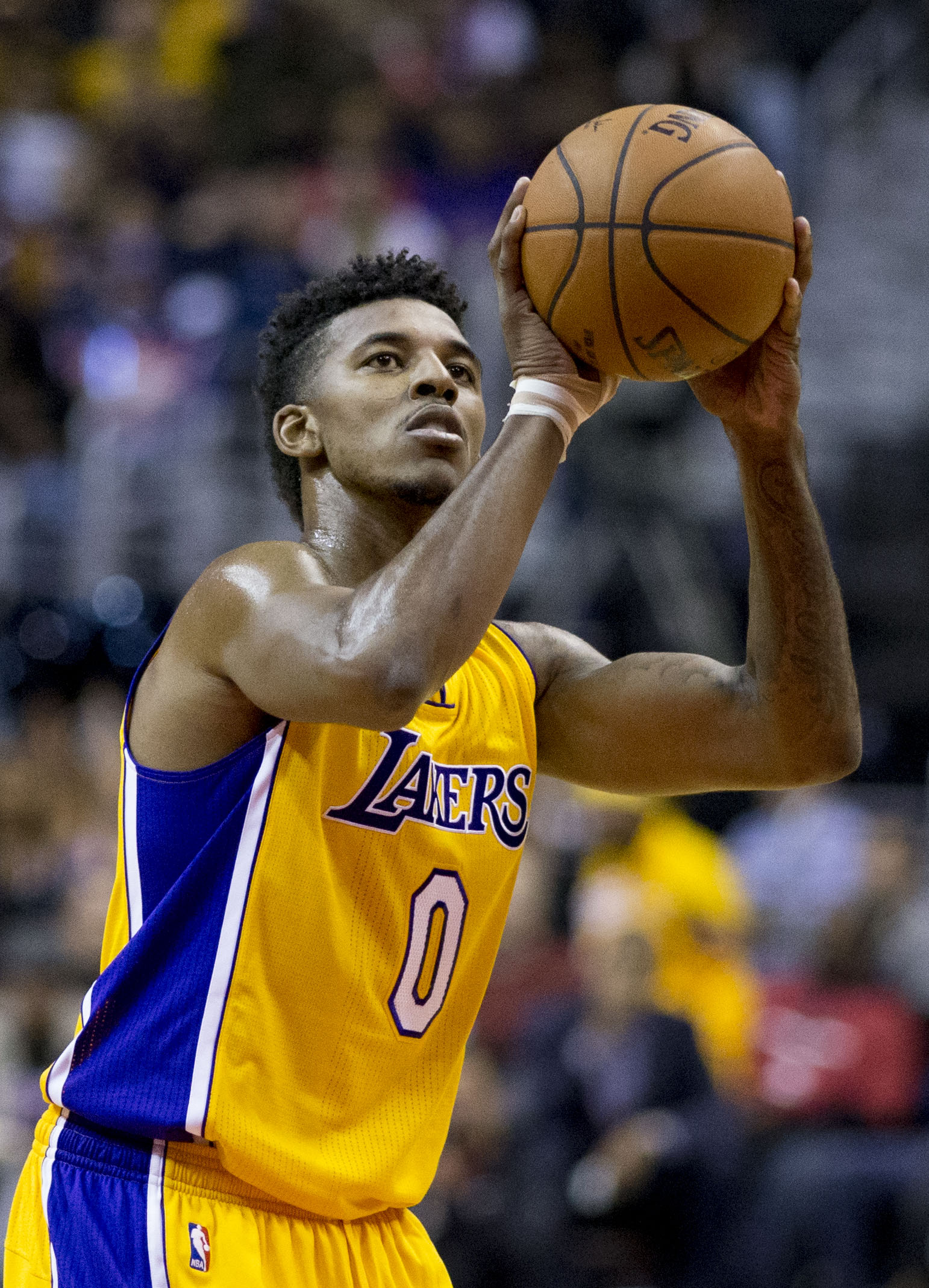
Nick Young

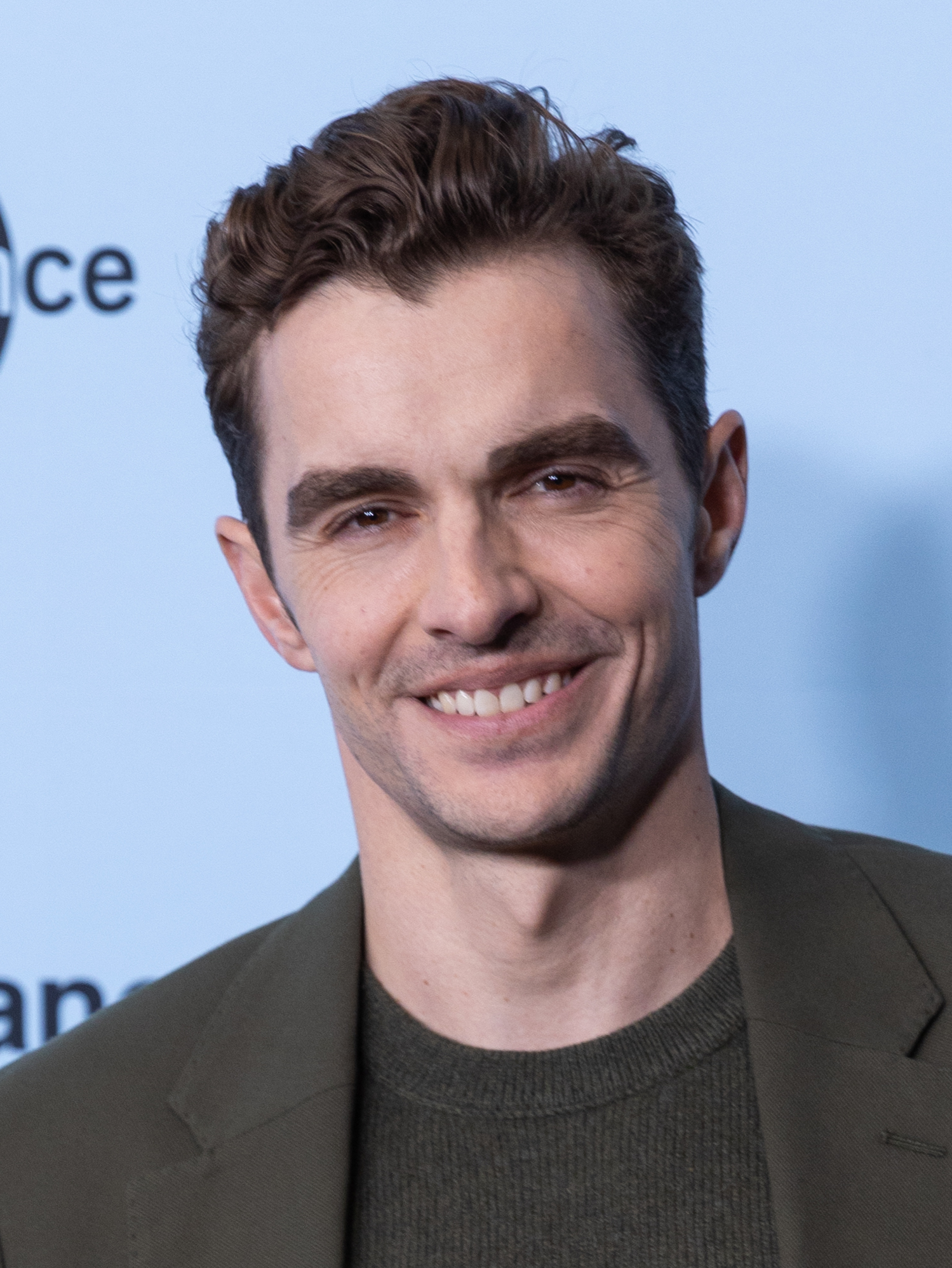
Dave Franco

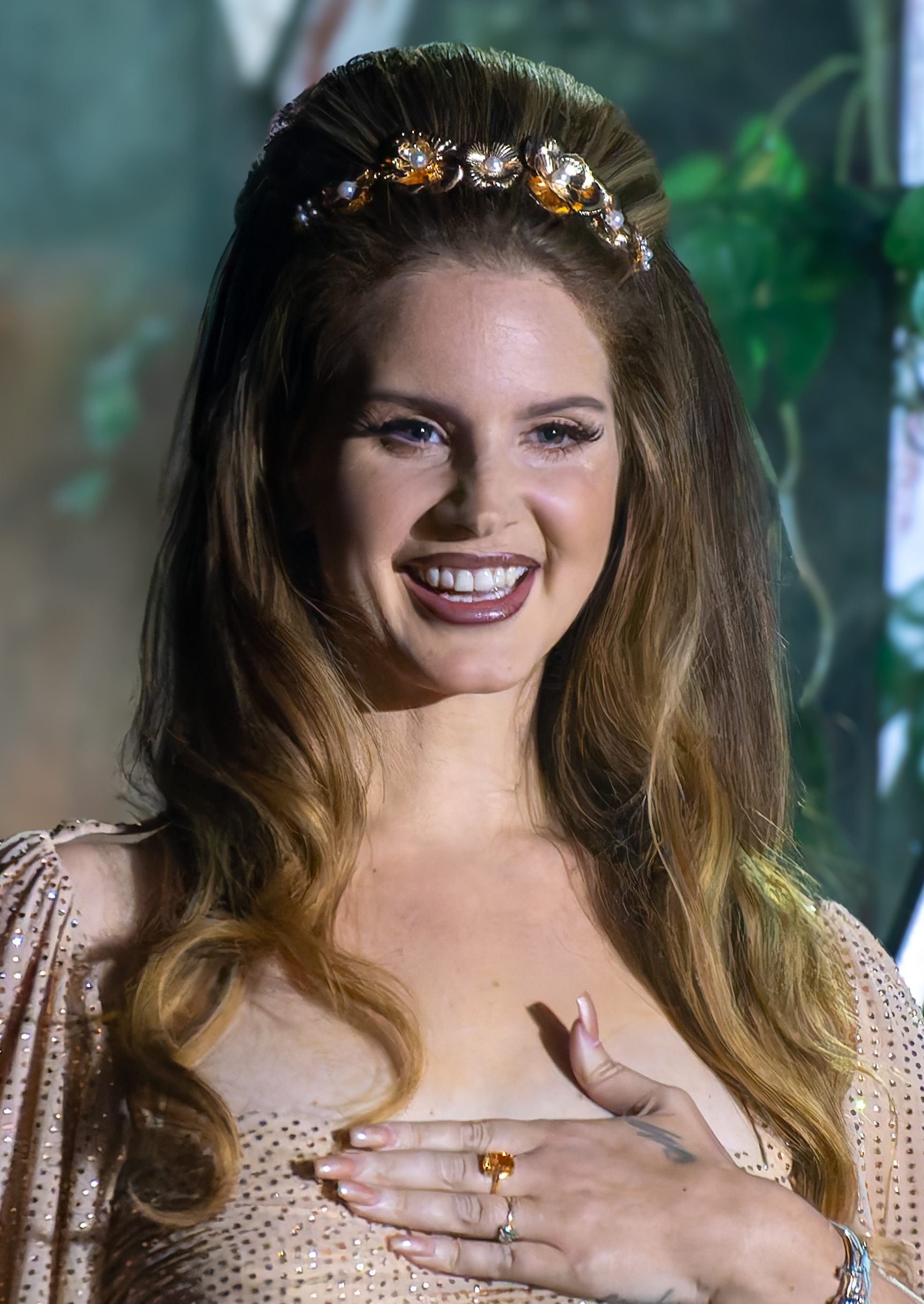
Lana Del Rey

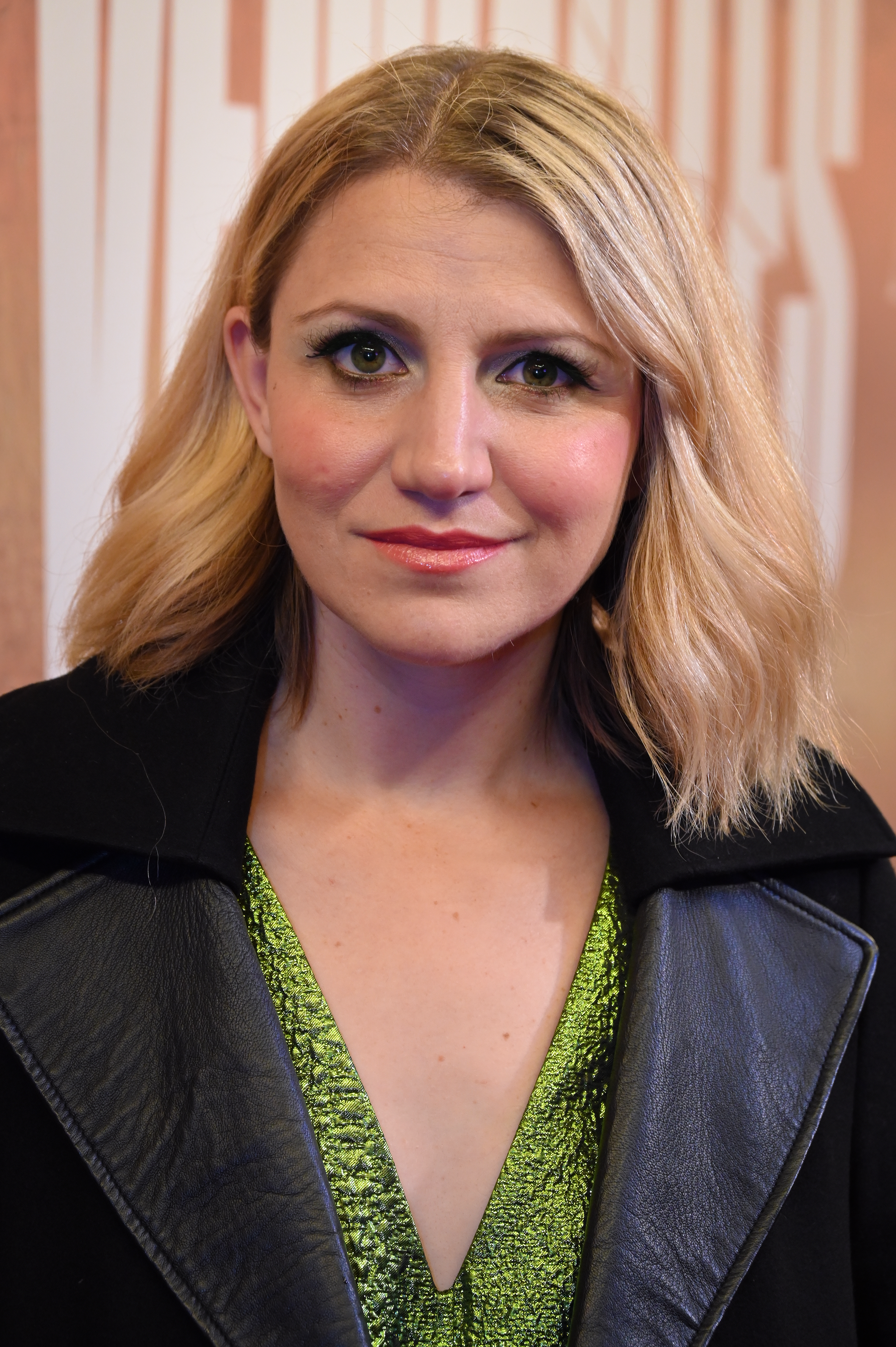
Annaleigh Ashford

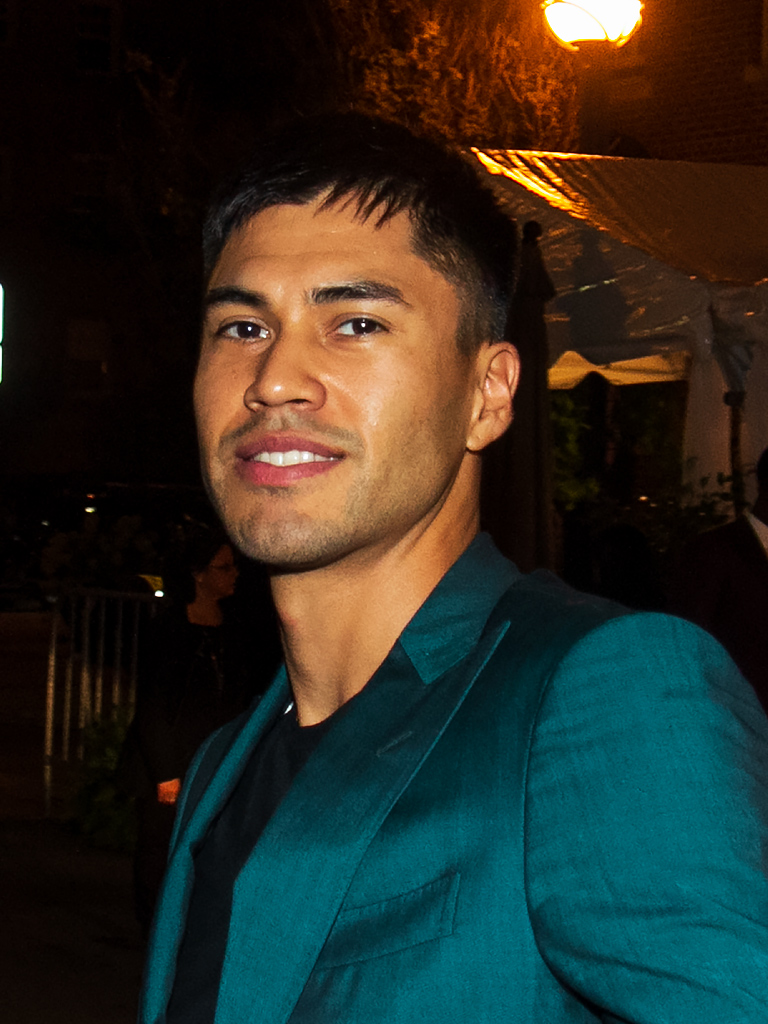
Martin Sensmeier

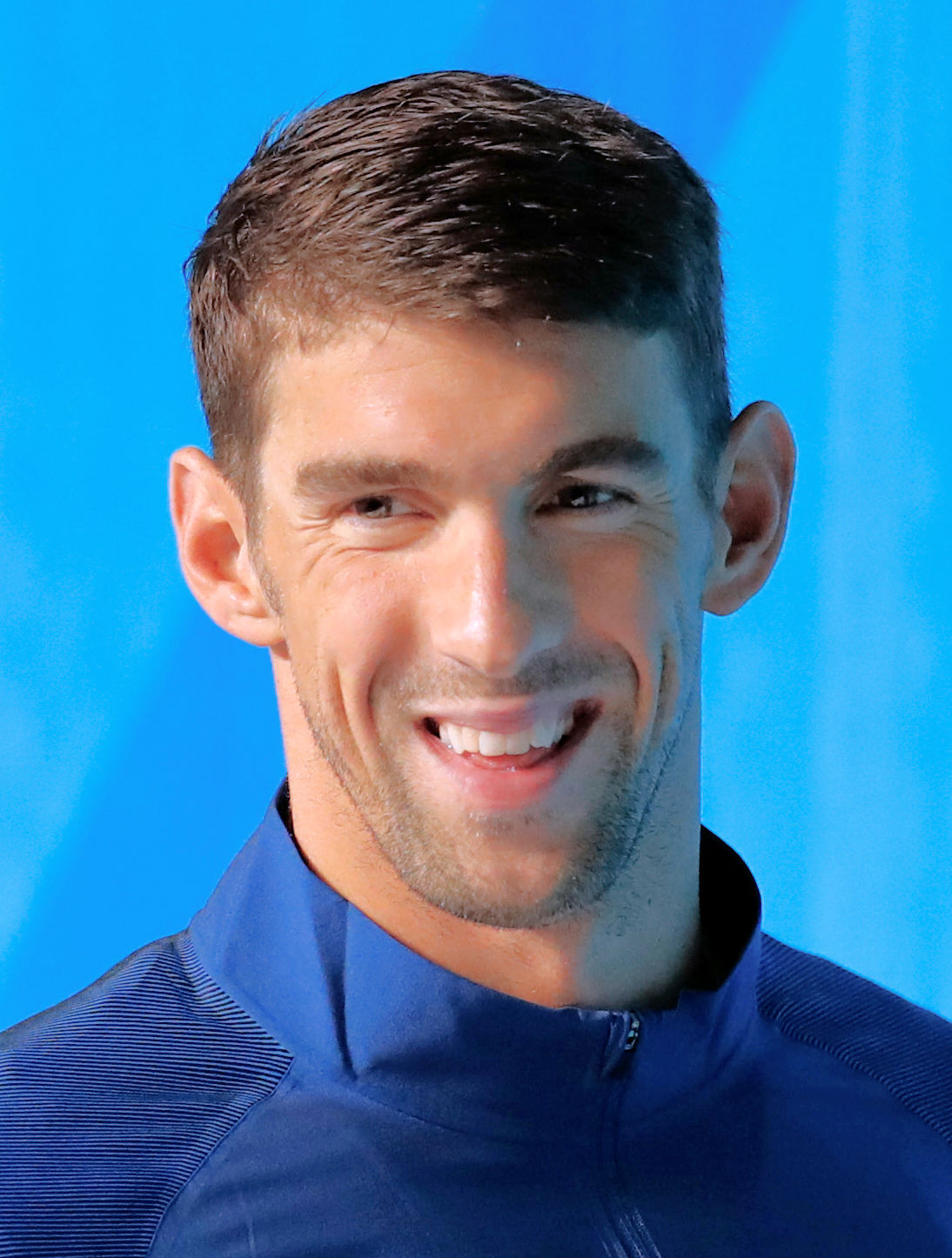
Michael Phelps

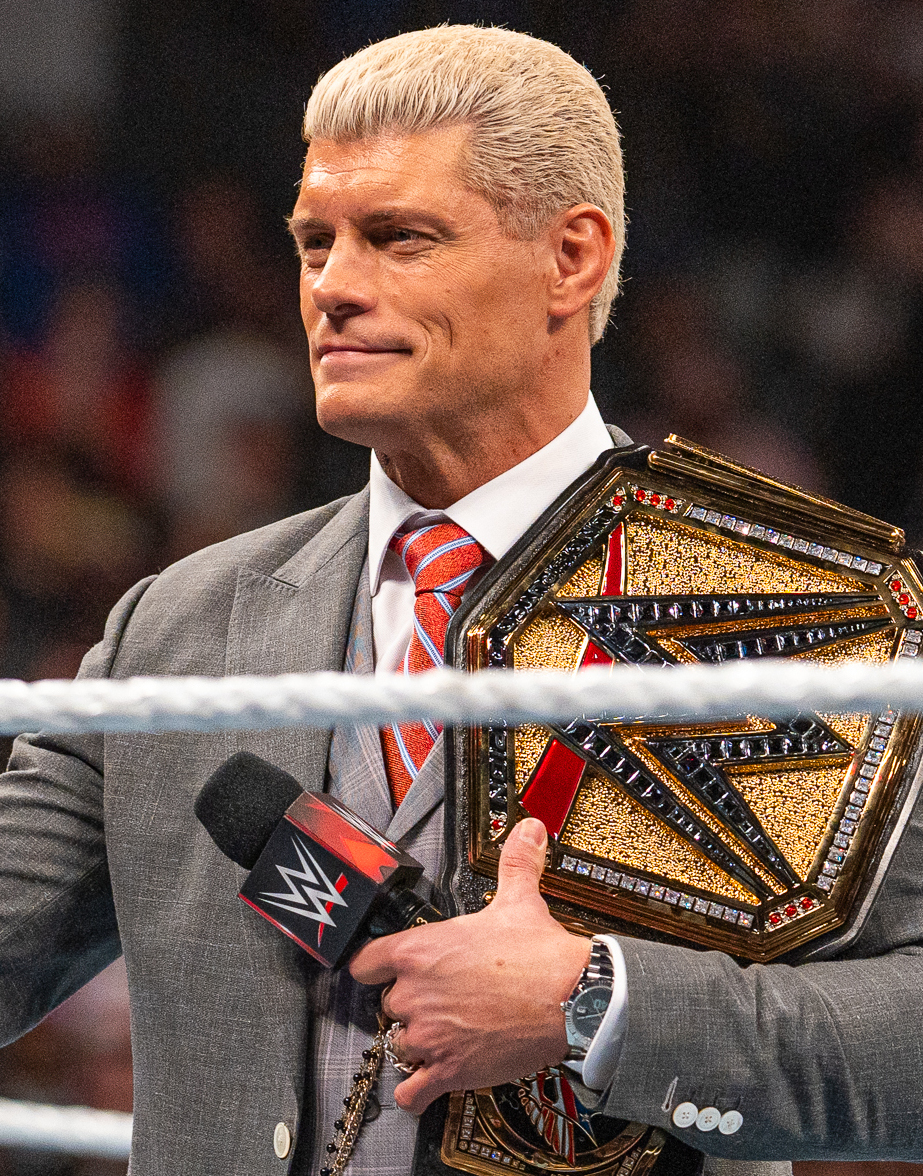
Cody Rhodes

- June 1
  - Ari Herstand, singer/songwriter
  - Nick Young, basketball player
- June 2 – Maggie Thrash, graphic novelist
- June 4 – Evan Lysacek, Olympic figure skater
- June 5
  - Jeremy Abbott, Olympic figure skater
  - Antonio Anderson, basketball player
  - Kelsey Campbell, Olympic wrestler
- June 6
  - Abbie Cobb, actress and author
  - Chris Henry, football player
  - Becky Sauerbrunn, soccer player
- June 8 – Rosanna Pansino, chef and YouTuber
- June 9 – Sebastian Telfair, basketball player
- June 10
  - Kristina Apgar, actress
  - Craig Considine, scholar of Islam
  - Celina Jade, actress
- June 11
  - Daron Cruickshank, mixed martial artist
  - Chris Trousdale, actor and recording artist (d. 2020)
- June 12
  - Jesse Anthony, cyclist
  - Dave Franco, actor
  - Blake Ross, software developer
  - Kendra Wilkinson, model, actress and author
  - Chris Young, singer/songwriter and guitarist
- June 13
  - Sean Carlson, music promoter
  - Christina Chang, American-born Jamaican footballer
- June 17
  - Michael Adams, football player
  - Tramell Tillman, actor
- June 18
  - Jon Abbate, football player
  - Jimmie Allen, country music singer/songwriter
  - Sorel Carradine, actress
  - Chris Coghlan, baseball player
  - Alex Hirsch, animator and actor
- June 20
  - Thaddeus Coleman, football player
  - Matt Flynn, football player
  - Mark Saul, actor
- June 21
  - Kris Allen, musician, 8th American Idol winner
  - Sara Anundsen, tennis player
  - DJ Candlestick, DJ, radio personality, and record producer
  - Lana Del Rey, pop musician
- June 22 – Scott MacIntyre, singer
- June 23
  - Roberto Castro, golfer
  - Candice Patton, actress
  - Marcel Reece, football player
- June 24
  - Justin Hires, ator and comedian
  - Jandy Nelson, Writer
- June 25
  - Annaleigh Ashford, actress and singer
  - Daniel Bard, baseball player
- June 27
  - Paul Downs Colaizzo, playwright, screenwriter, and film director
  - Martin Sensmeier, actor
- June 28
  - Cory Blair, rugby player
  - Alexx Calise, singer/songwriter and musician
- June 29 – Steven Hauschka, football player
- June 30
  - Trevor Ariza, basketball player
  - Tim Crowder, football player
  - Michael Phelps, Olympic swimmer
  - Cody Rhodes, wrestler and actor

=== July ===
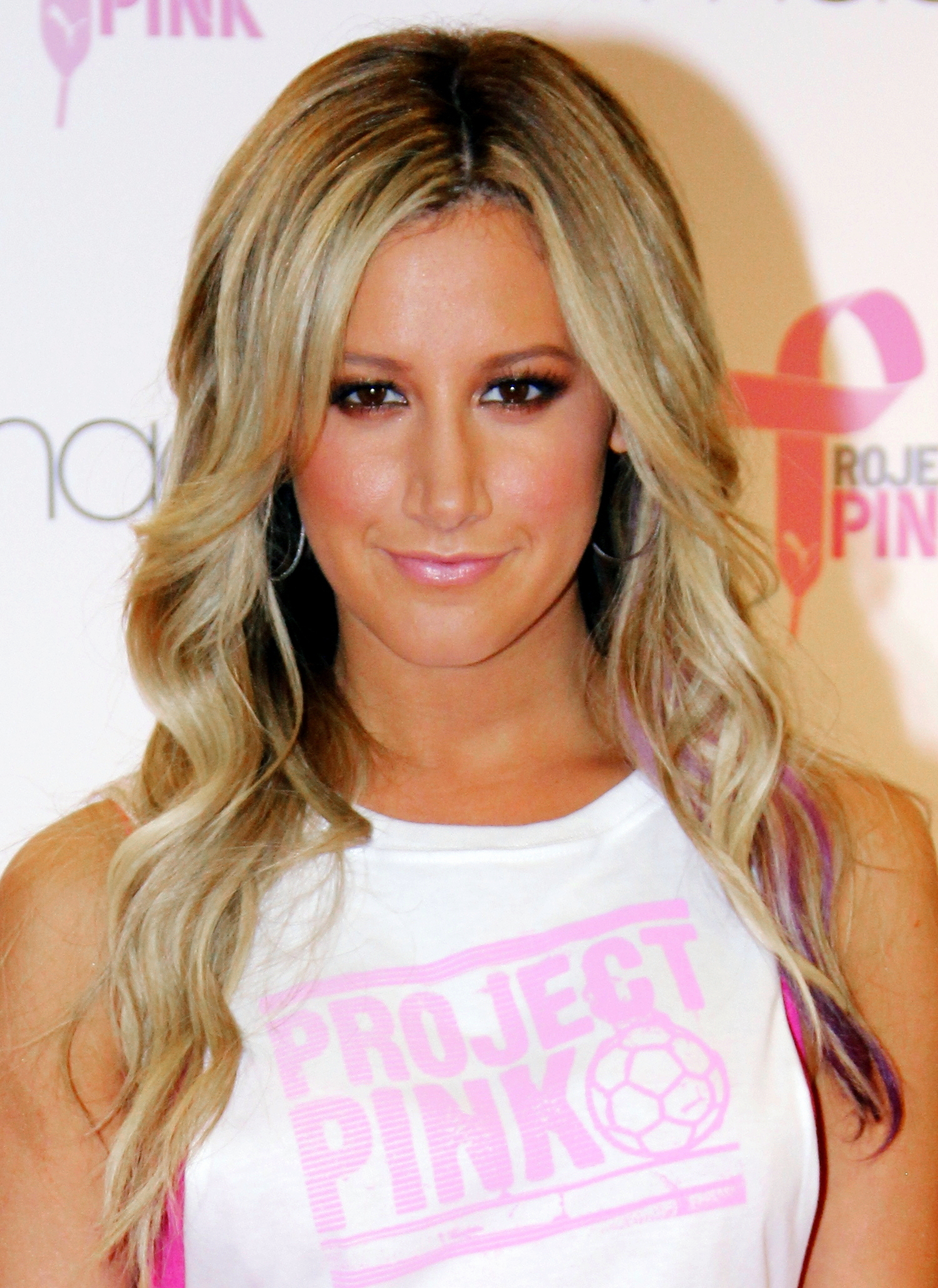
Ashley Tisdale

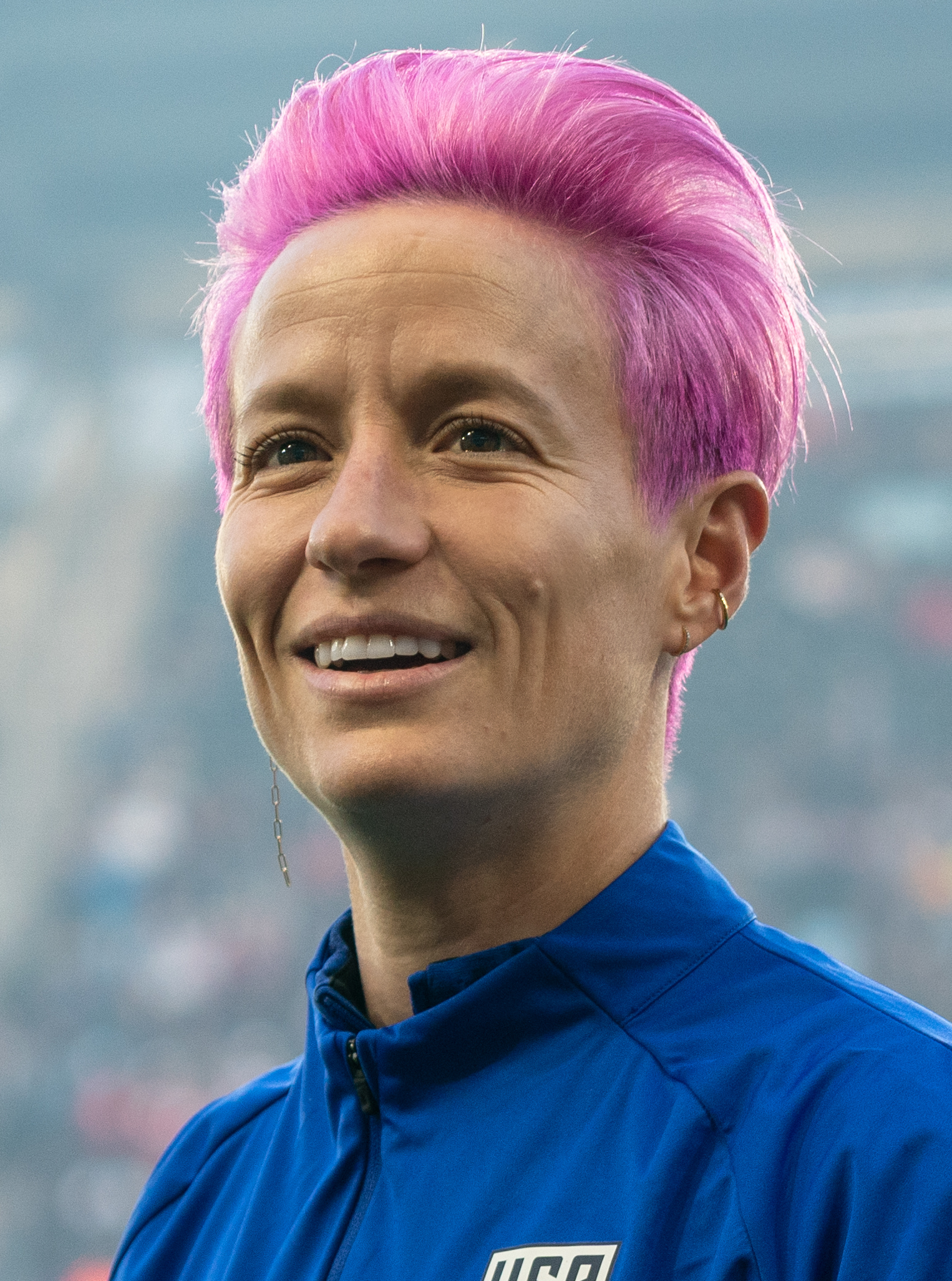
Megan Rapinoe

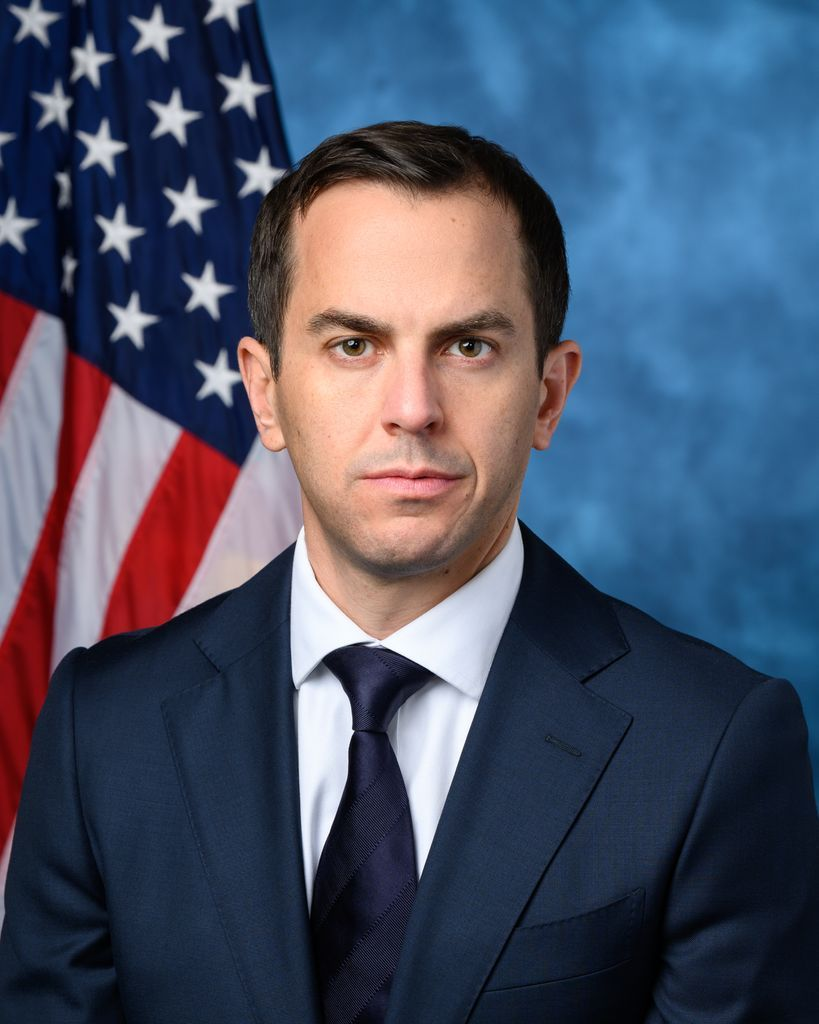
Rob Menendez

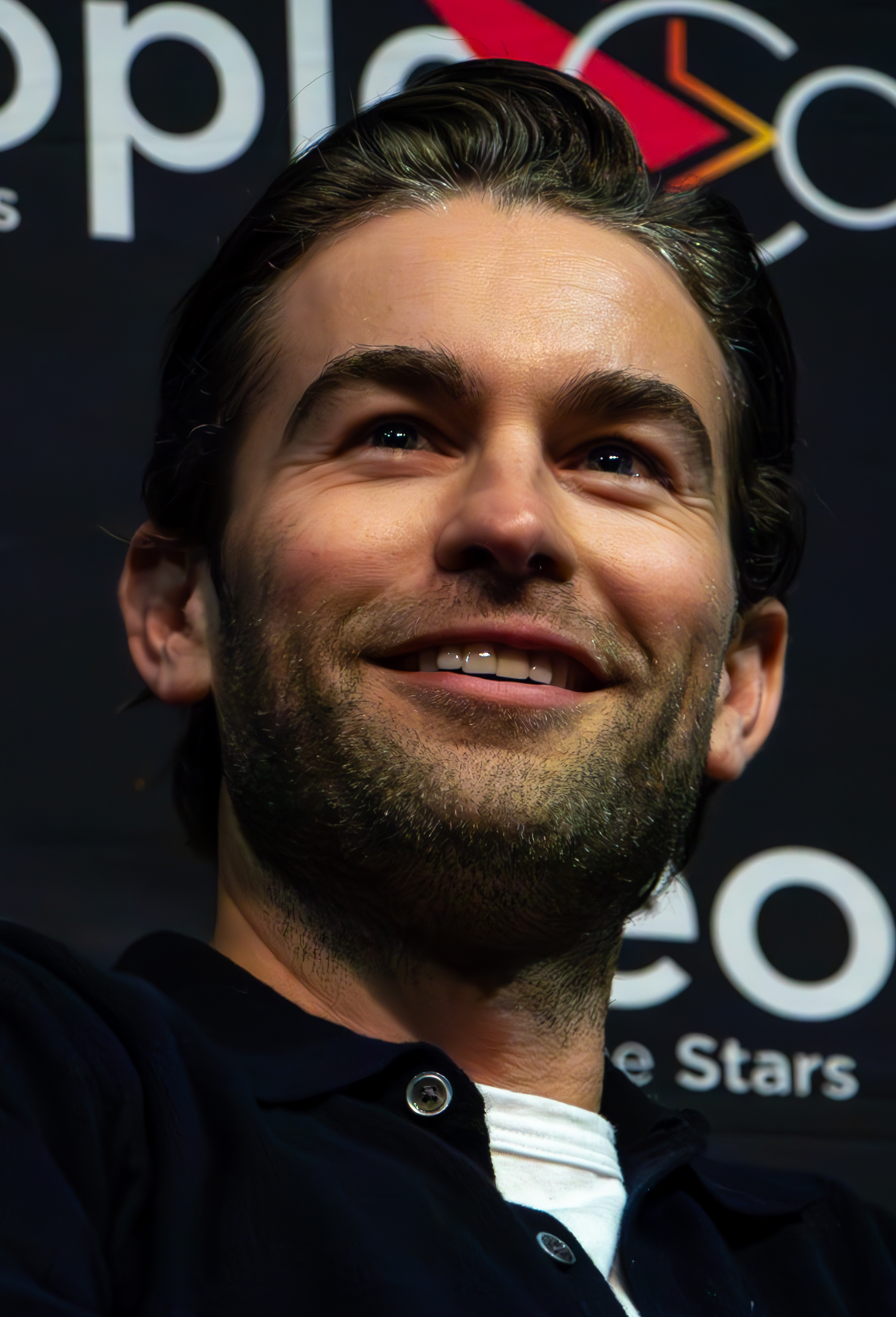
Chace Crawford

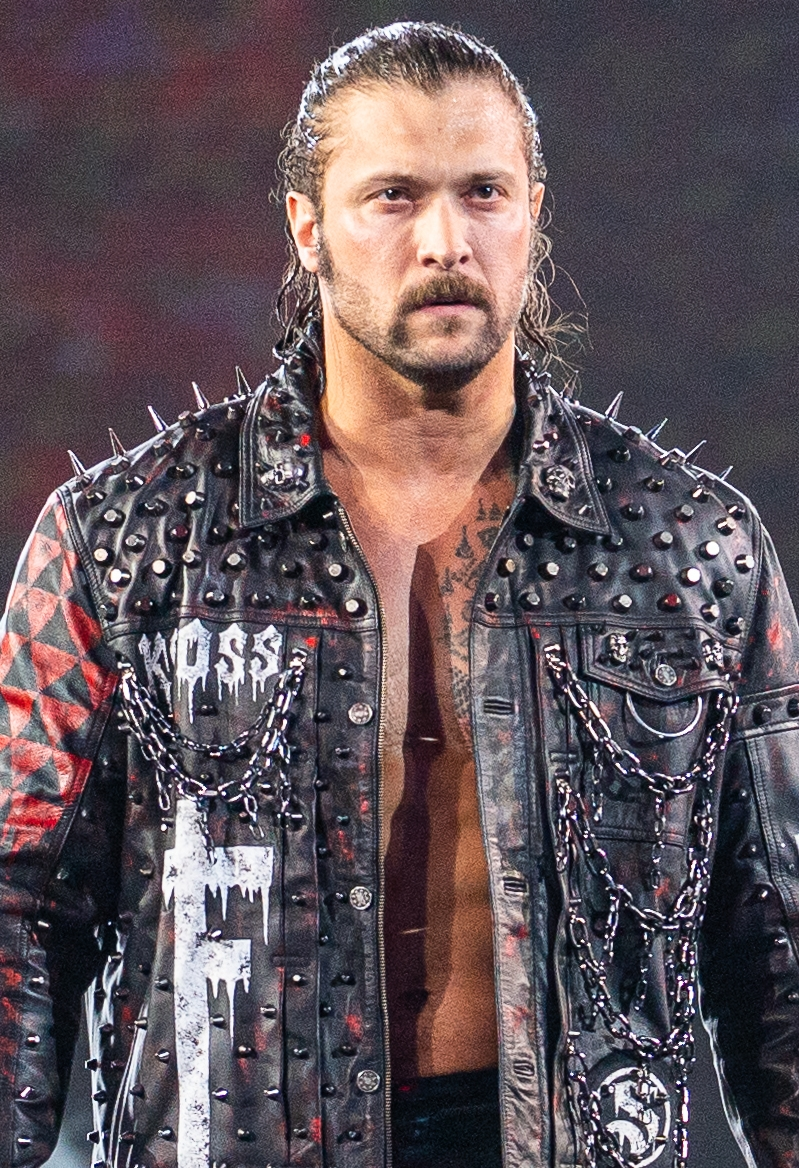
Karrion Kross

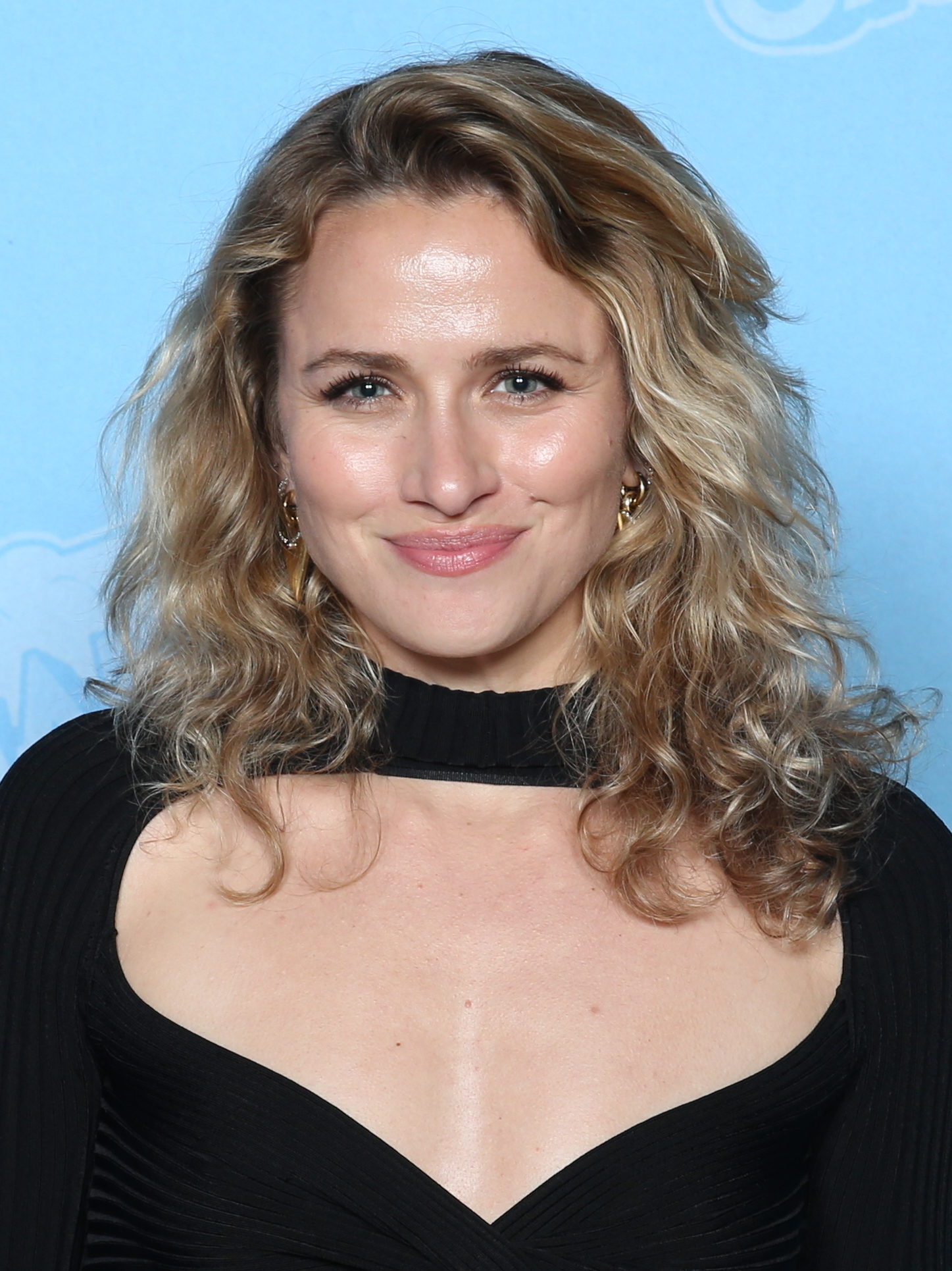
Shantel VanSanten

- July 1 – Spose, Hip-Hop artist
- July 2
  - Nelson Franklin, actor
  - Ashley Tisdale, actress, singer and producer
- July 4 – Sean Cunningham, musician, singer/songwriter, and recording artist
- July 5 – Megan Rapinoe, soccer player
- July 6
  - John Chest, opera singer
  - Matt Overton, football player
  - D. Woods, pop musician and member of Danity Kane (2005–2008)
- July 7 – Craig Capano, soccer player
- July 8
  - David Clowney, football player
  - Sterling Hyltin, ballerina
- July 9 – Cris Cyborg, Brazilian-born mixed martial artist
- July 10 – B. J. Crombeen, American-born Canadian ice hockey player
- July 11
  - Robert Adamson, actor
  - Faysal Ahmed, Yemeni-born actor
  - Tiffany Andrade, beauty pageant winner, Miss New Jersey 2008
  - Geoff Cameron, soccer player
  - Mike Cox, football player
- July 12
  - Ryan Amoroso, basketball player
  - Casper Brinkley, football player
  - Jasper Brinkley, football player
  - Rob Menendez, politician
- July 14 – Darrelle Revis, football player
- July 15 – David Carpenter, baseball player
- July 16 – Rosa Salazar, actress
- July 17 – Caitlin Van Zandt, actress
- July 18
  - Chace Crawford, actor
  - Theo Croker, jazz trumpeter, composer, producer, and vocalist
  - Hopsin, rapper and record producer
  - Sheng Thao, politician
- July 19
  - LaMarcus Aldridge, basketball player
  - Karrion Kross, professional wrestler
- July 20 – John Francis Daley, actor
- July 22
  - Lindsey Carmichael, Paralympic archer
  - Takudzwa Ngwenya, Zimbabwean-born rugby player
- July 23 – Scott Chandler, football player
- July 24 – Chad Cook, football player
- July 25
  - James Lafferty, actor
  - Alex Presley, baseball player
  - Shantel VanSanten, actress and model
- July 26 – Matt Riddlehoover, filmmaker
- July 27
  - Husain Abdullah, football player
  - Lou Taylor Pucci, actor
  - Young Dolph, rapper (d. 2021)
- July 28 – Monica Abbott, softball player
- July 29
  - Charlotte Cho, esthetician, author, and entrepreneur
- July 30
  - Dylan Axelrod, baseball player
  - Mary Wiseman, actress
- July 31 – Shannon Curfman, blues-rock singer and guitarist

=== August ===
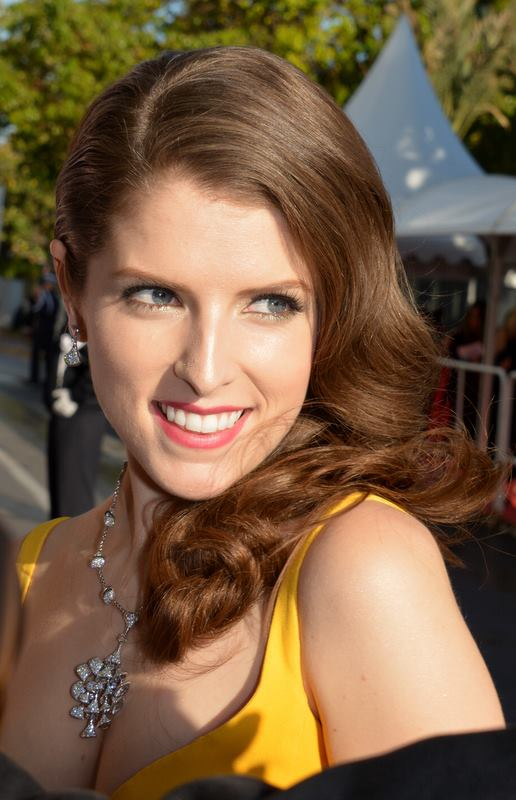
Anna Kendrick

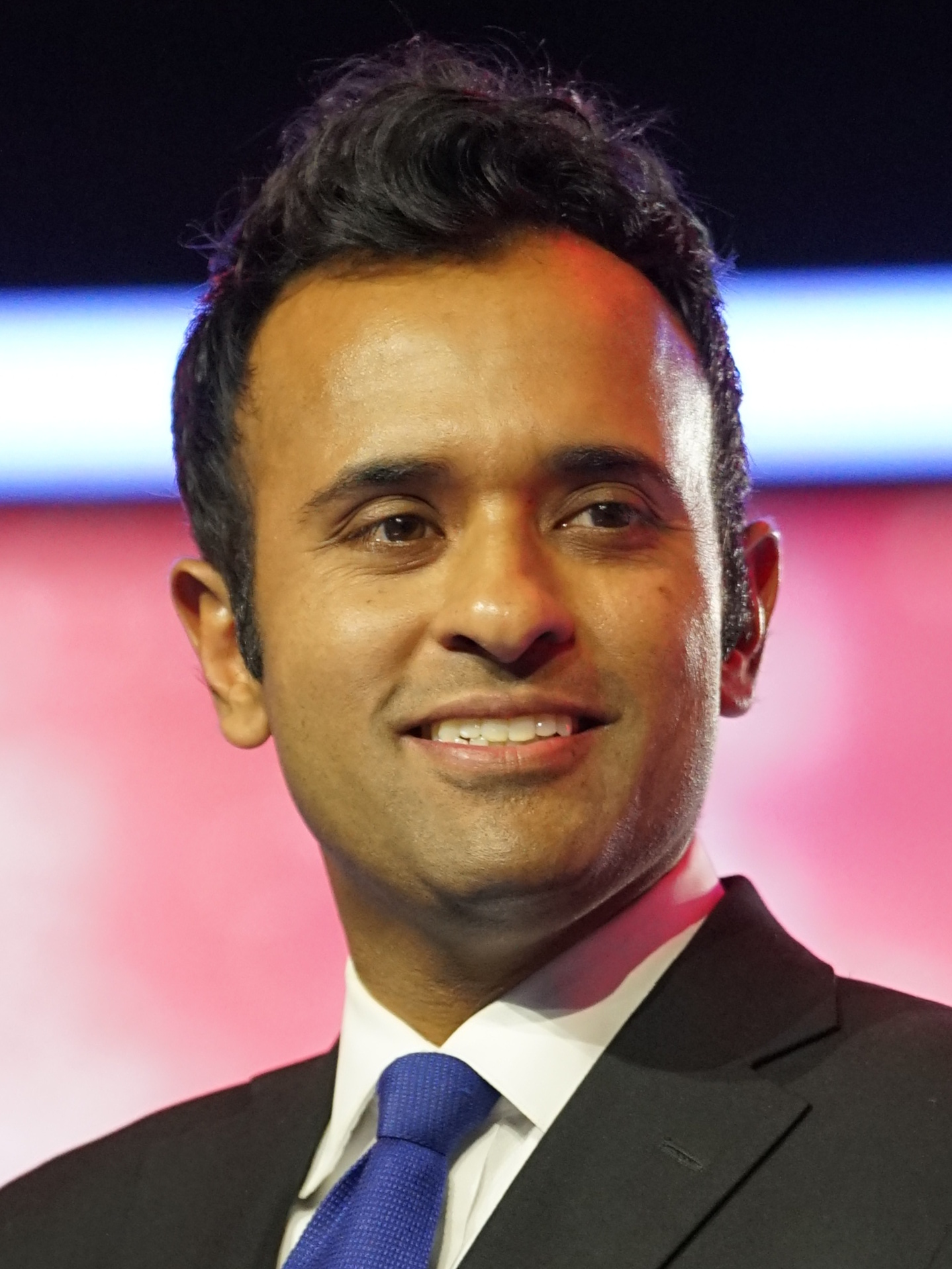
Vivek Ramaswamy

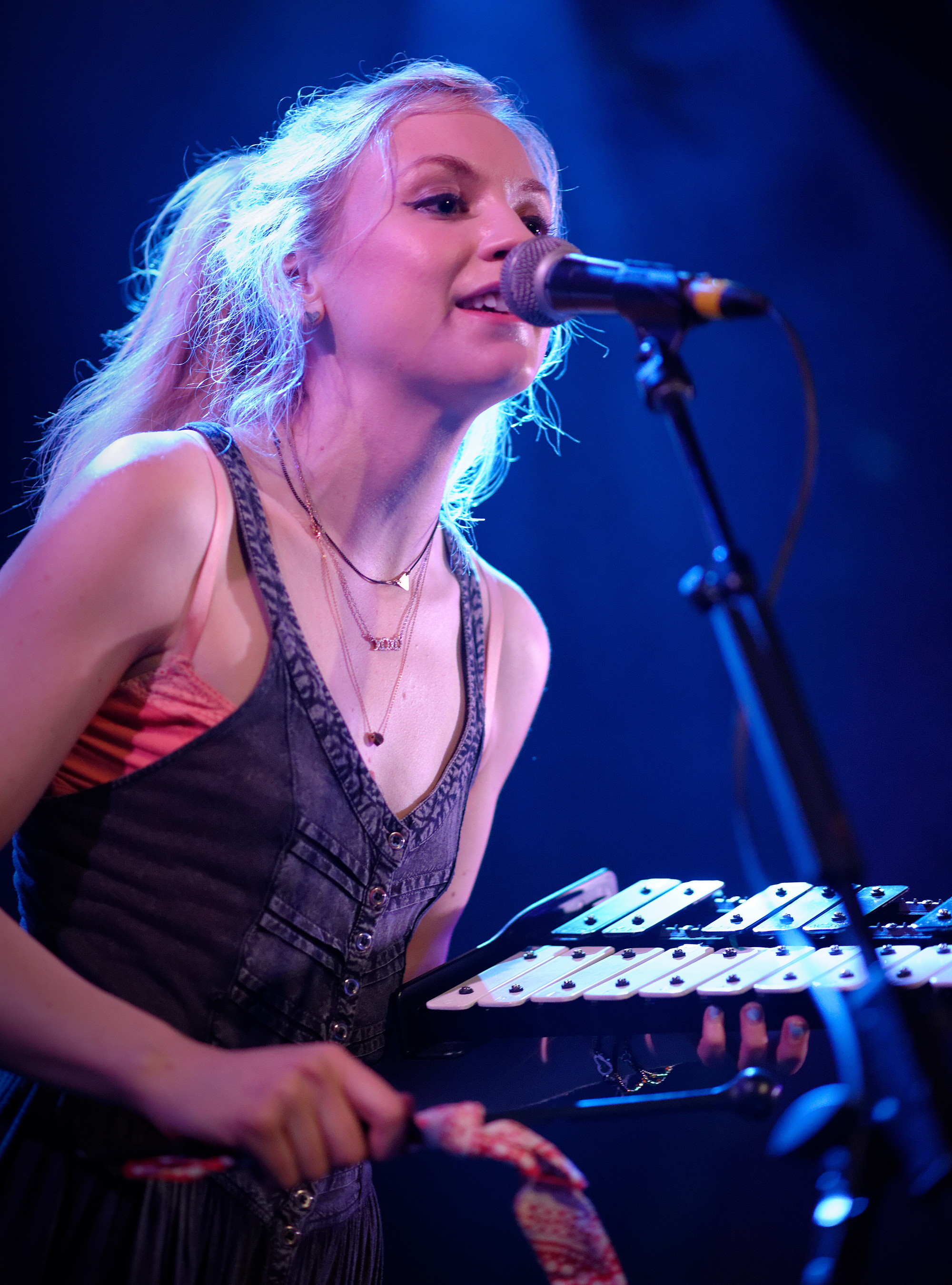
Emily Kinney

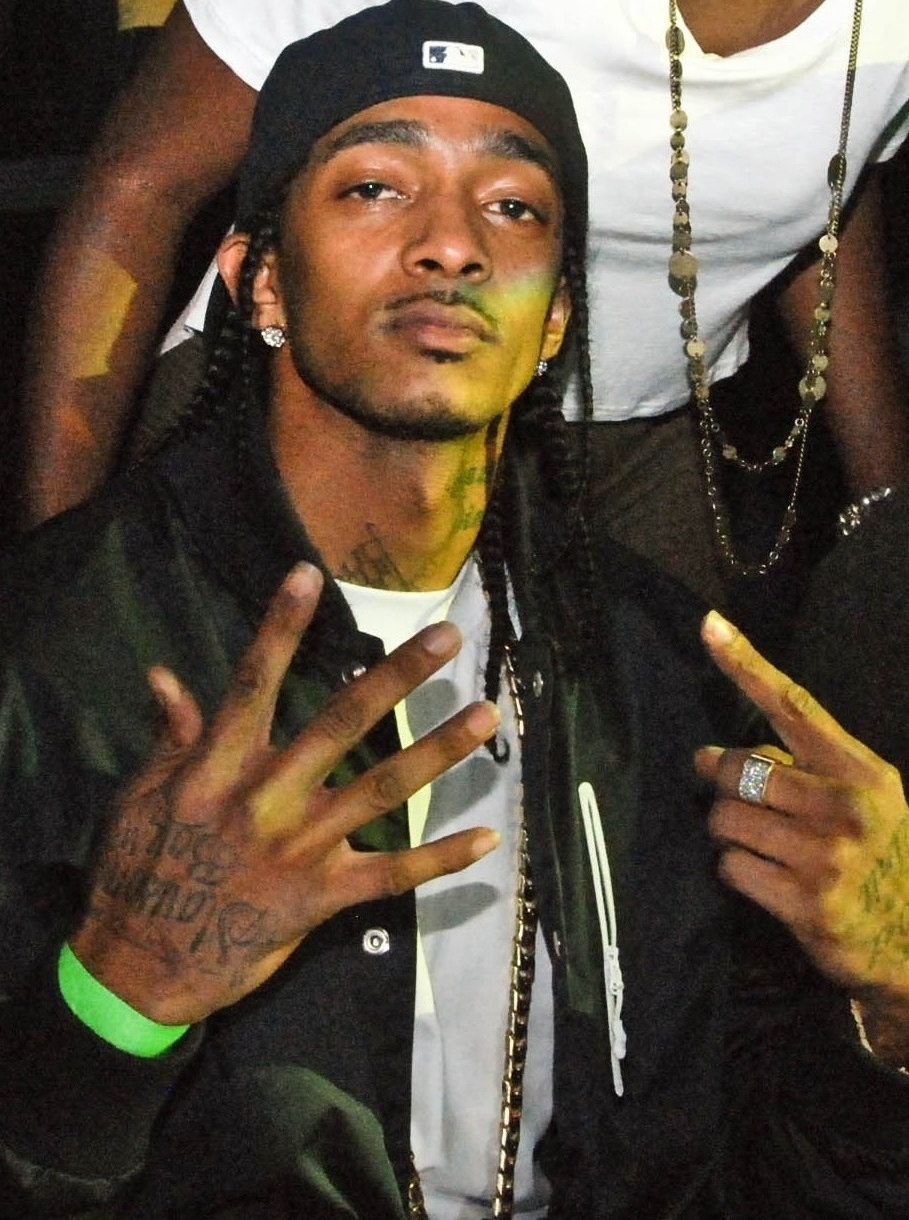
Nipsey Hussle

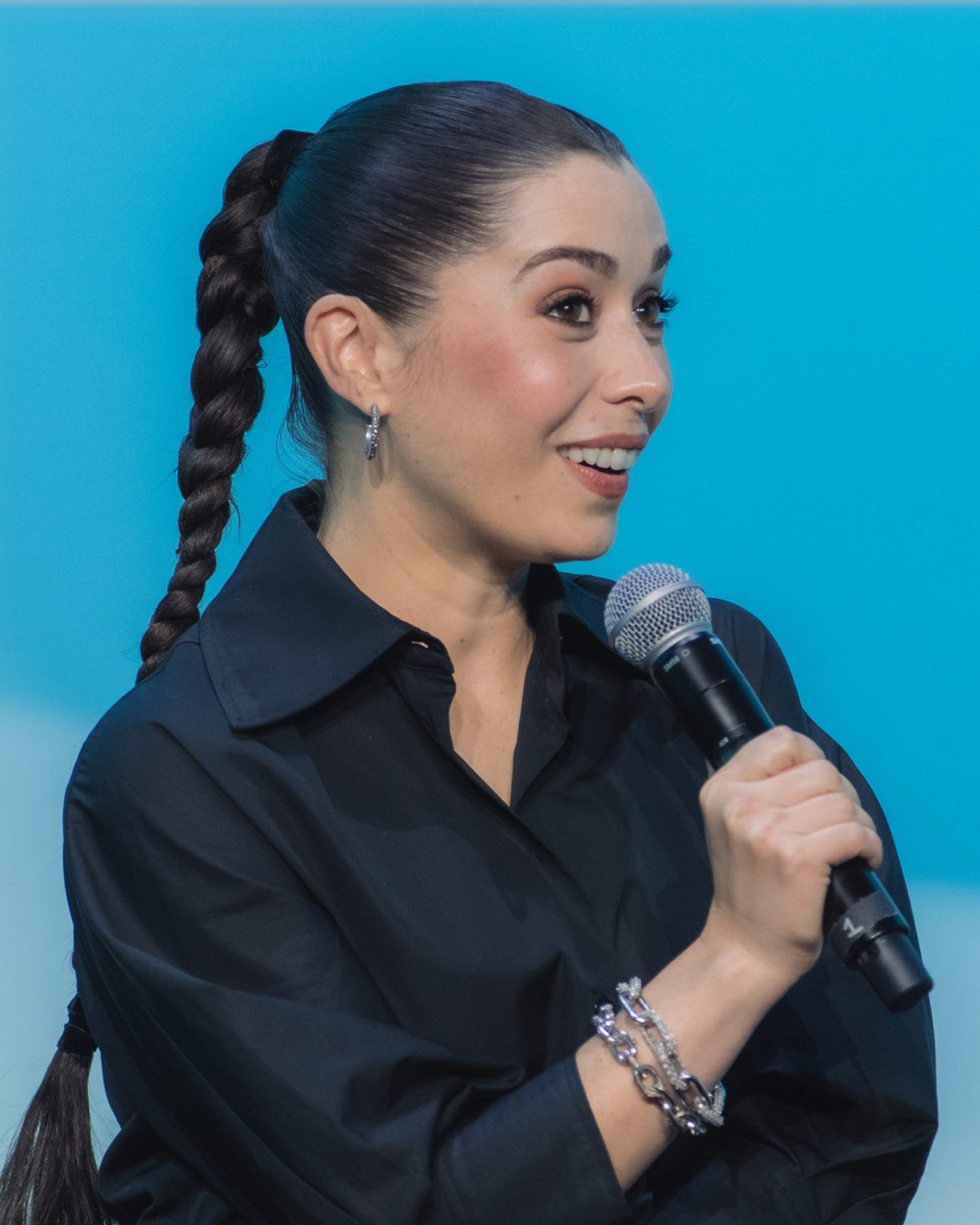
Cristin Milioti

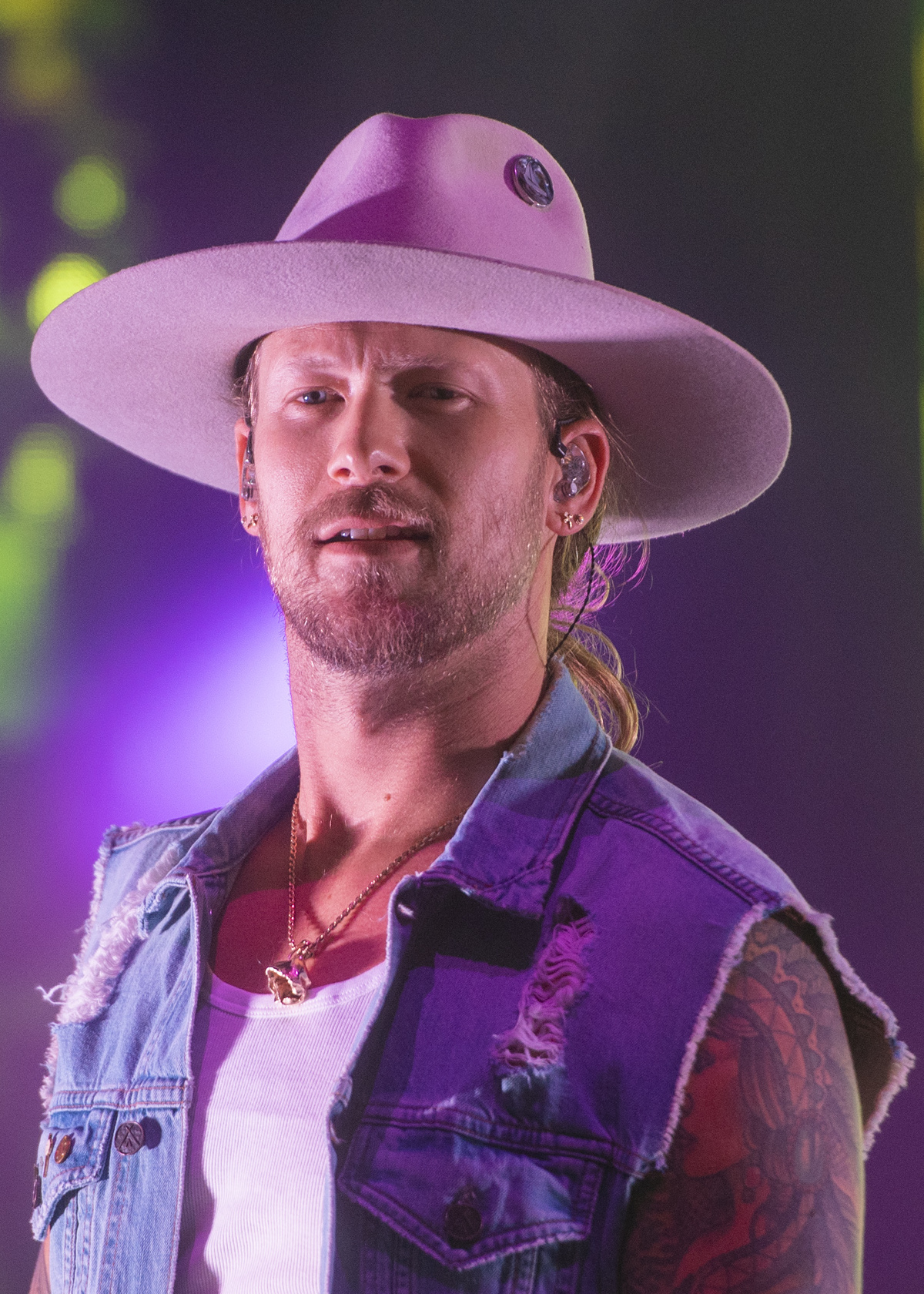
Brian Kelley

- August 3
  - Tom Cox, politician
  - Ryan Leone, novelist, film producer, artist, and prison reform activist (d. 2022)
- August 4 – Crystal Bowersox, singer/songwriter
- August 5
  - Zach Appelman, actor
  - Gary Chambers, activist and political candidate
- August 6 – Michael Antonini, baseball player
- August 7 – Michael Campbell, guitarist and bassist
- August 8
  - Rafael Casal, writer, actor, producer, and showrunner
  - Anisha Nicole, singer
- August 9
  - Anna Kendrick, actress and singer
  - Hayley Peirsol, swimmer
  - Vivek Ramaswamy, entrepreneur, author, political activist, political candidate, and co-founder of Strive Asset Management
  - JaMarcus Russell, football player
  - Chandler Williams, football player (d. 2013)
- August 10 – Reggie Campbell, football player and Navy aviator in the United States Navy Reserve
- August 11 – Asher Roth, rapper
- August 12 – Zack Cozart, baseball player
- August 13
  - Jonathan Brookins, mixed martial artist
  - Lacey Brown, singer
- August 14 – Adam Brown, politician
- August 15
  - Emily Kinney, actress and singer/songwriter
  - Nipsey Hussle, rapper (d. 2019)
- August 16
  - Agnes Bruckner, actress
  - Arden Cho, actress, singer, and model
  - Cristin Milioti, actress and singer
- August 17 – Kennard Cox, football player
- August 18
  - Desiree Casado, actress
  - Brooke Harman, actress
- August 19
  - J. Evan Bonifant, actor
  - David A. Gregory, actor and writer
  - Lindsey Jacobellis, Olympic snowboarder
- August 20
  - Brant Daugherty, actor
  - Josh Flagg, businessman and television personality
  - Miguel Gomez, Colombian-born actor
  - Michael Shuman, bassist for Queens of the Stone Age
- August 21 – Jake Pitts, singer/songwriter and lead guitarist for Black Veil Brides
- August 22
  - Jimmy Needham, Christian singer/songwriter
  - The Usos, twin brother wrestling duo
- August 25 – Wynter Gordon, pop/dance singer/songwriter
- August 26 – Brian Kelley, country singer and one half of Florida Georgia Line
- August 27 –
  - Jennifer Armour, actress and voice actress
  - Kayla Ewell, actress
  - Sean Foreman, singer/songwriter, member of electro hop group 3OH!3
  - Alexandra Nechita, painter
  - Francisco San Martín, Spanish-born actor (d. 2025)
- August 28
  - Mike Alston, football player
  - Pat Cassidy, film producer and music manager
  - Jackson Crawford, scholar
  - Ashlyne Huff, singer/songwriter and dancer
  - Jay Ruais, politician
- August 29
  - Alexander Artemev, Soviet-born Olympic gymnast
  - T. J. Conley, football player
  - Jeffrey Licon, actor
  - Marc Rzepczynski, baseball player

=== September ===
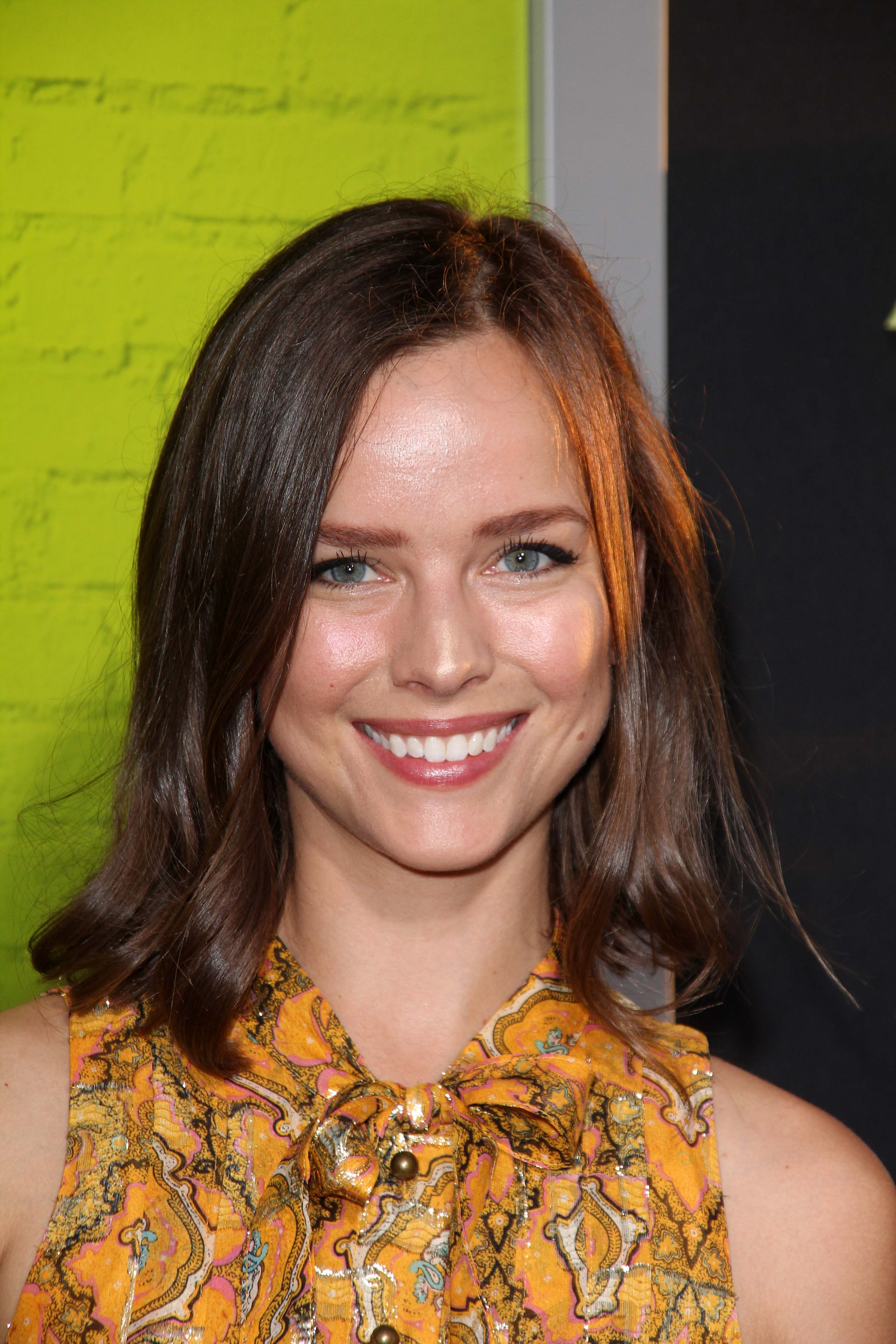
Allison Miller

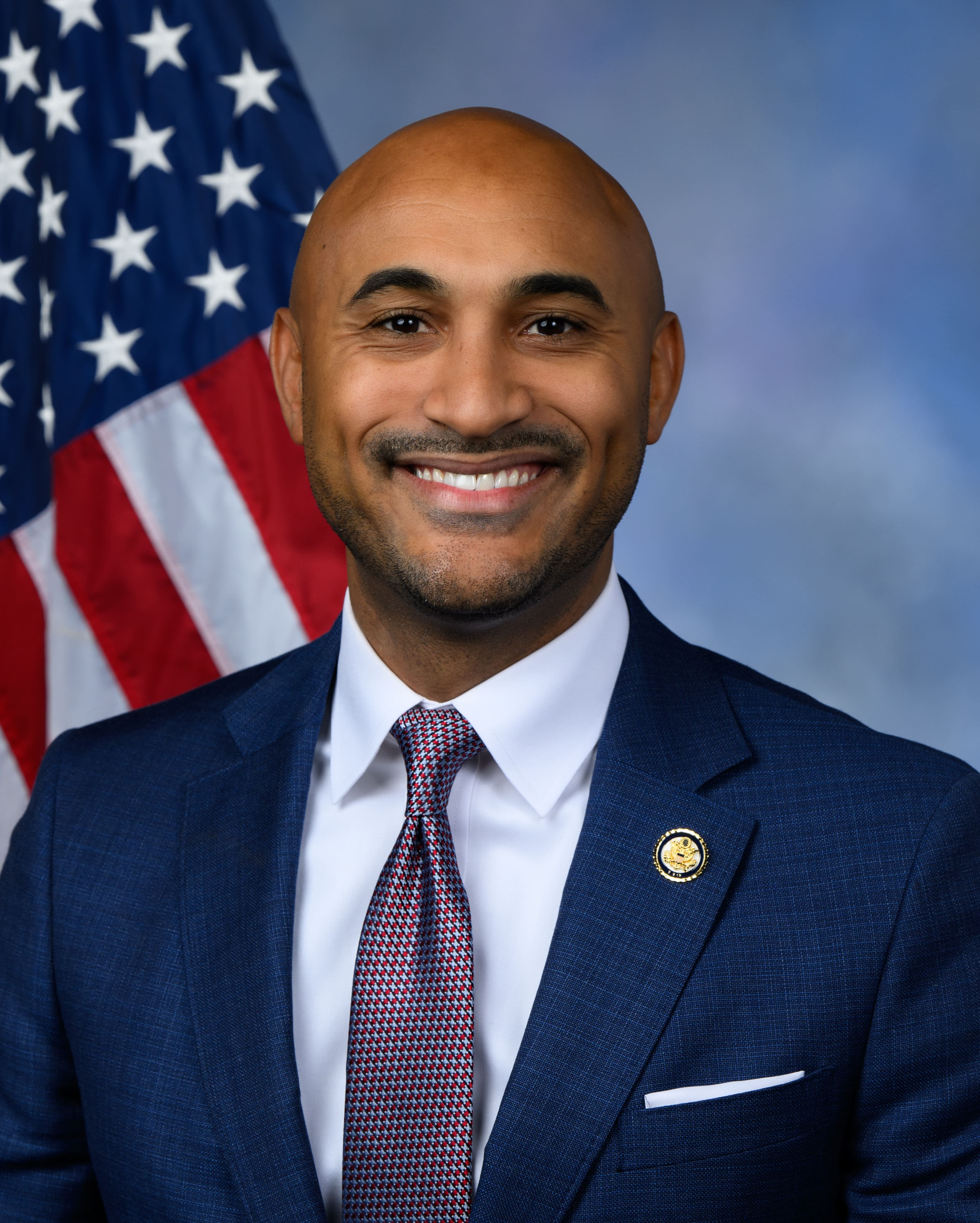
Shomari Figures

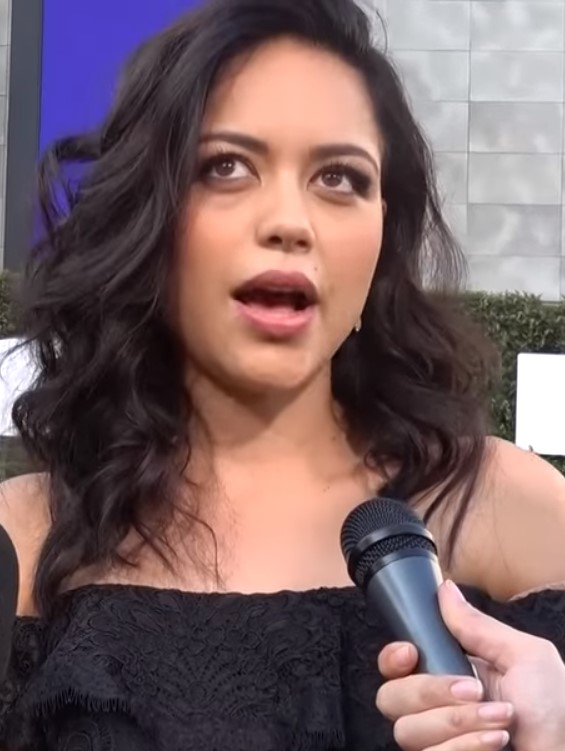
Alyssa Diaz

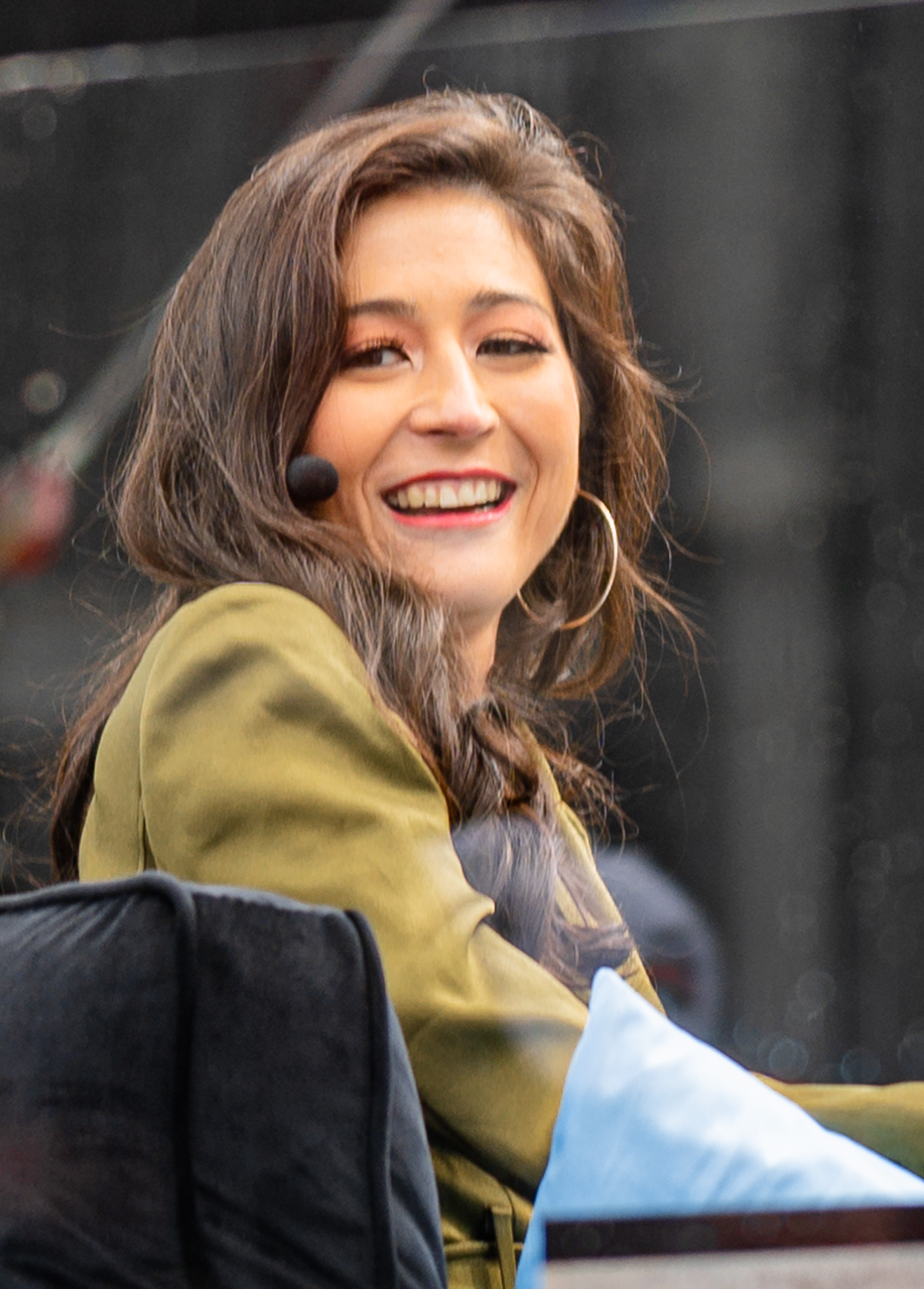
Mina Kimes

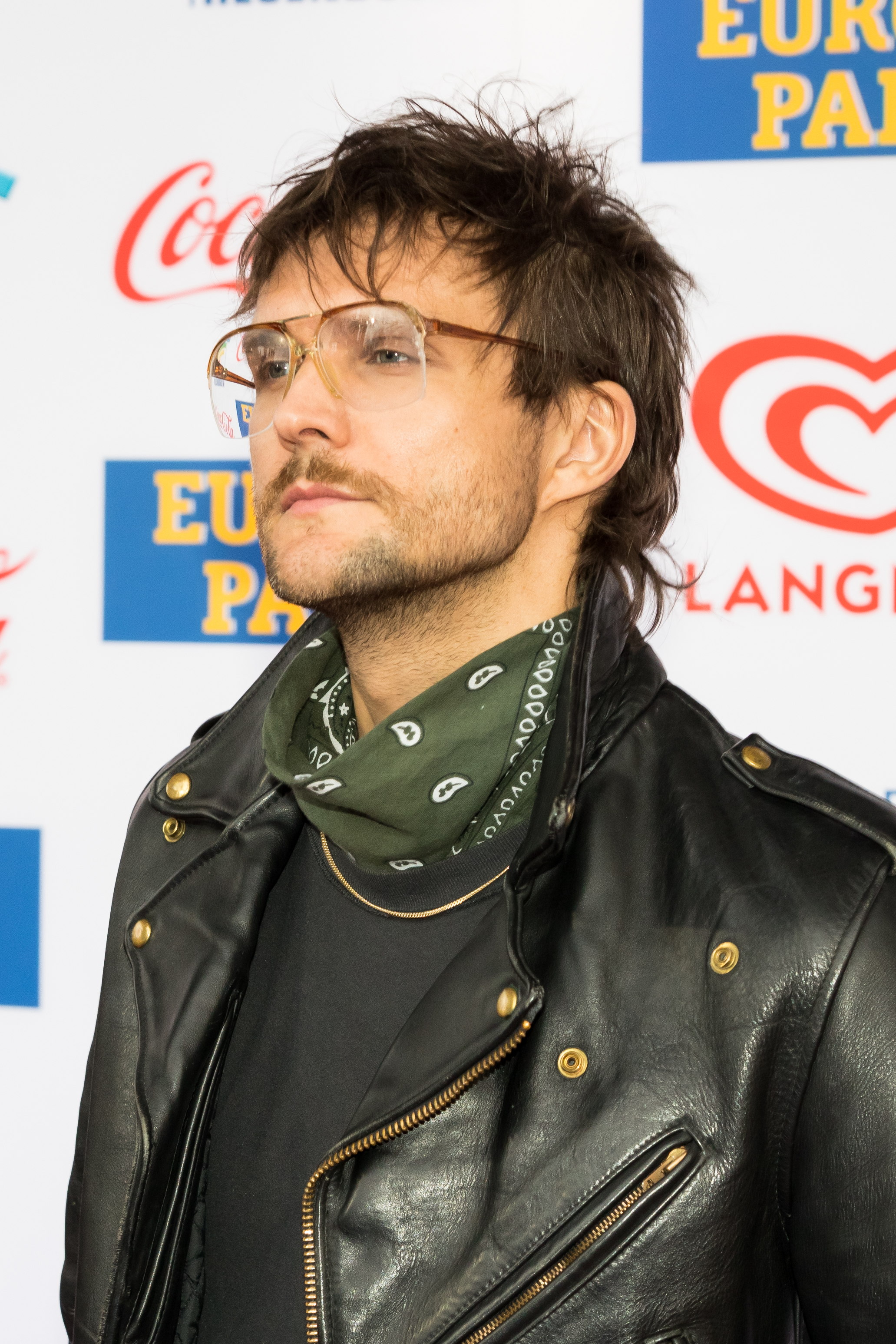
Martin Johnson

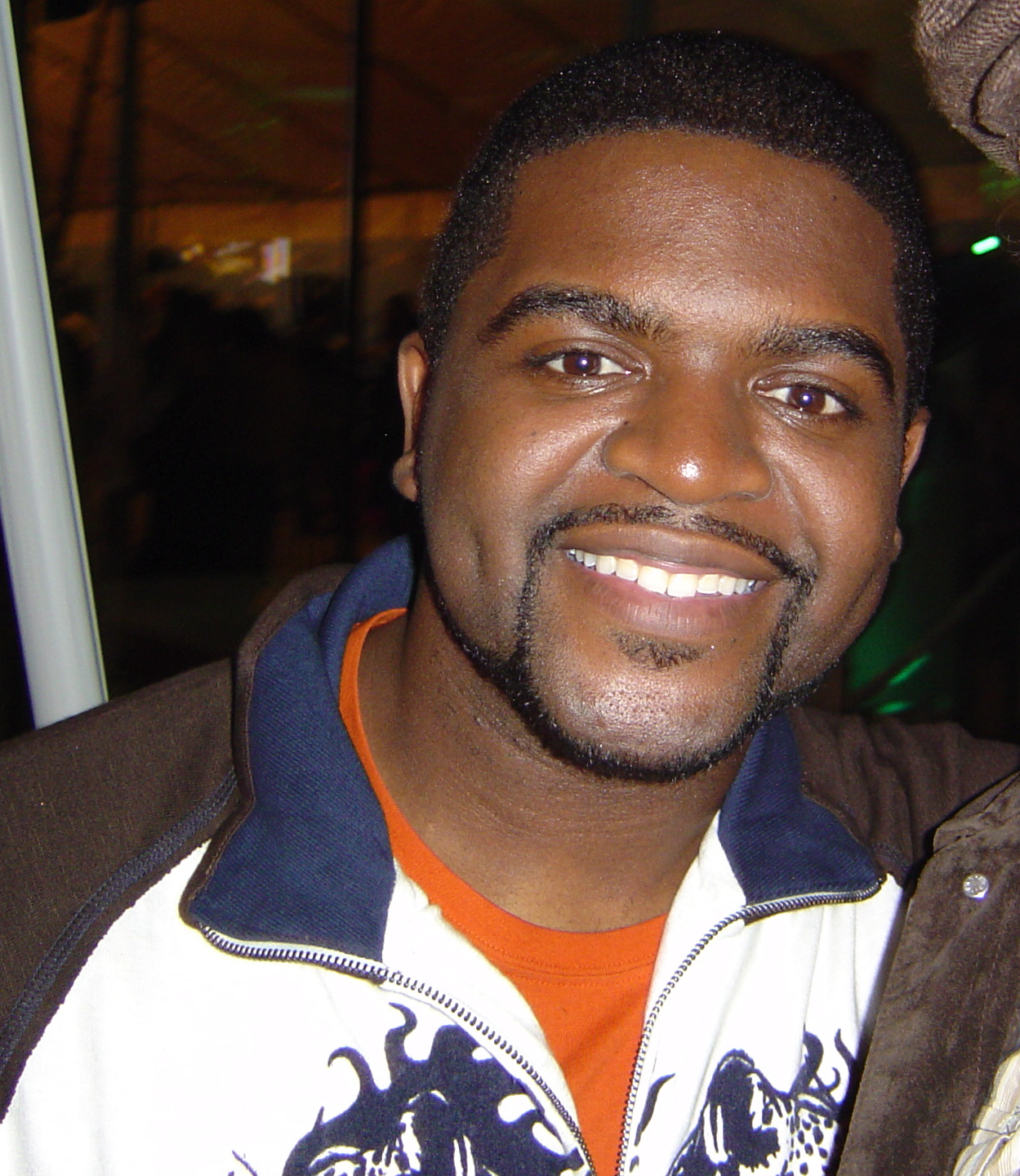
Chikezie

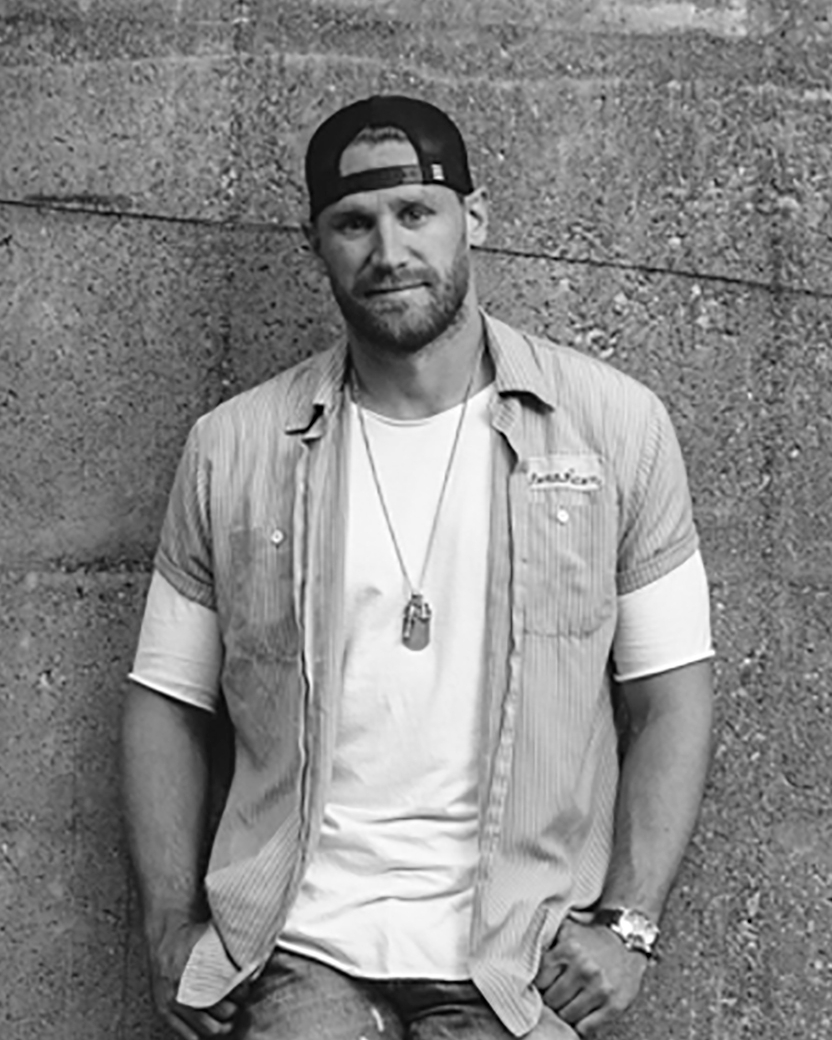
Chase Rice

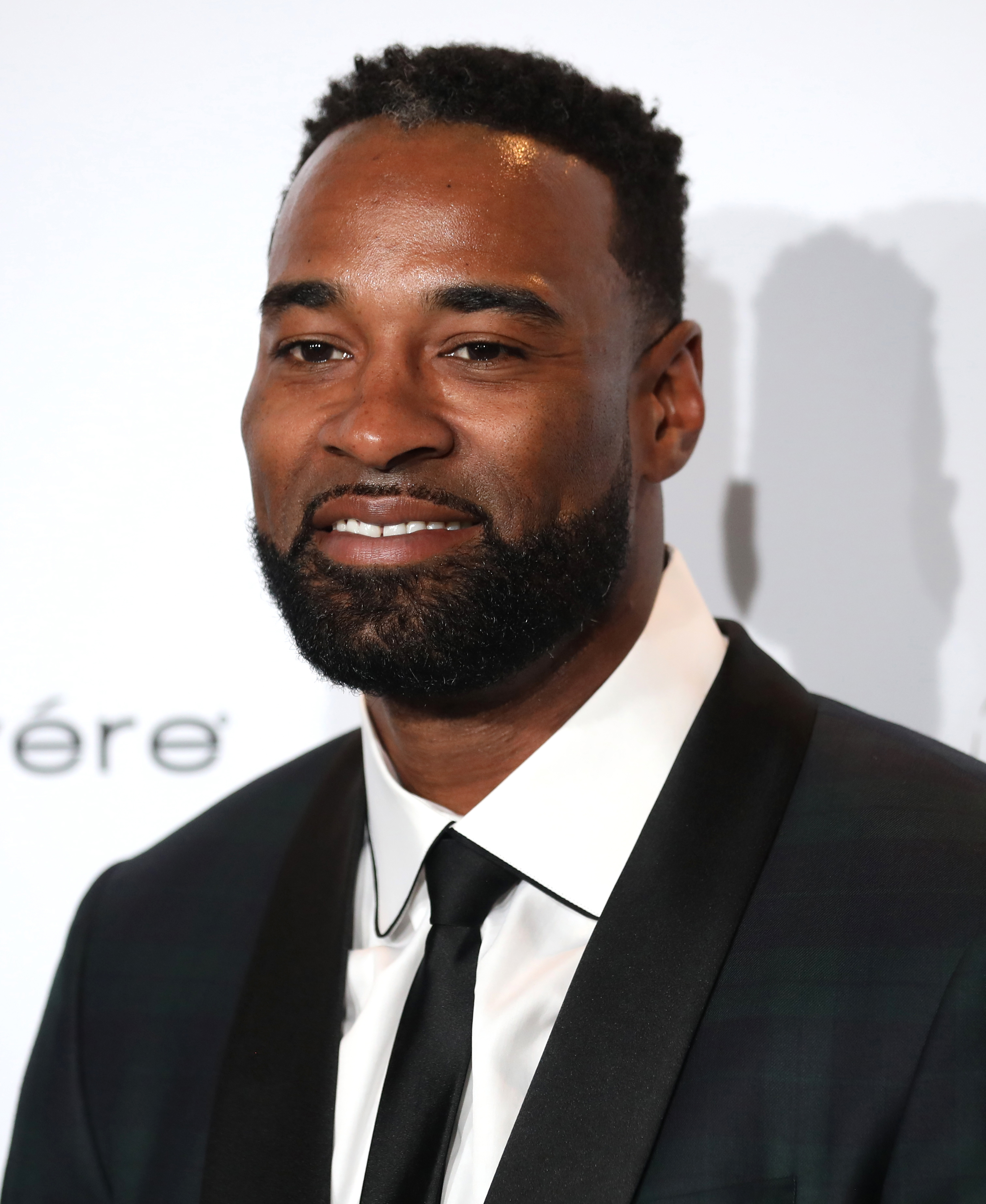
Calvin Johnson

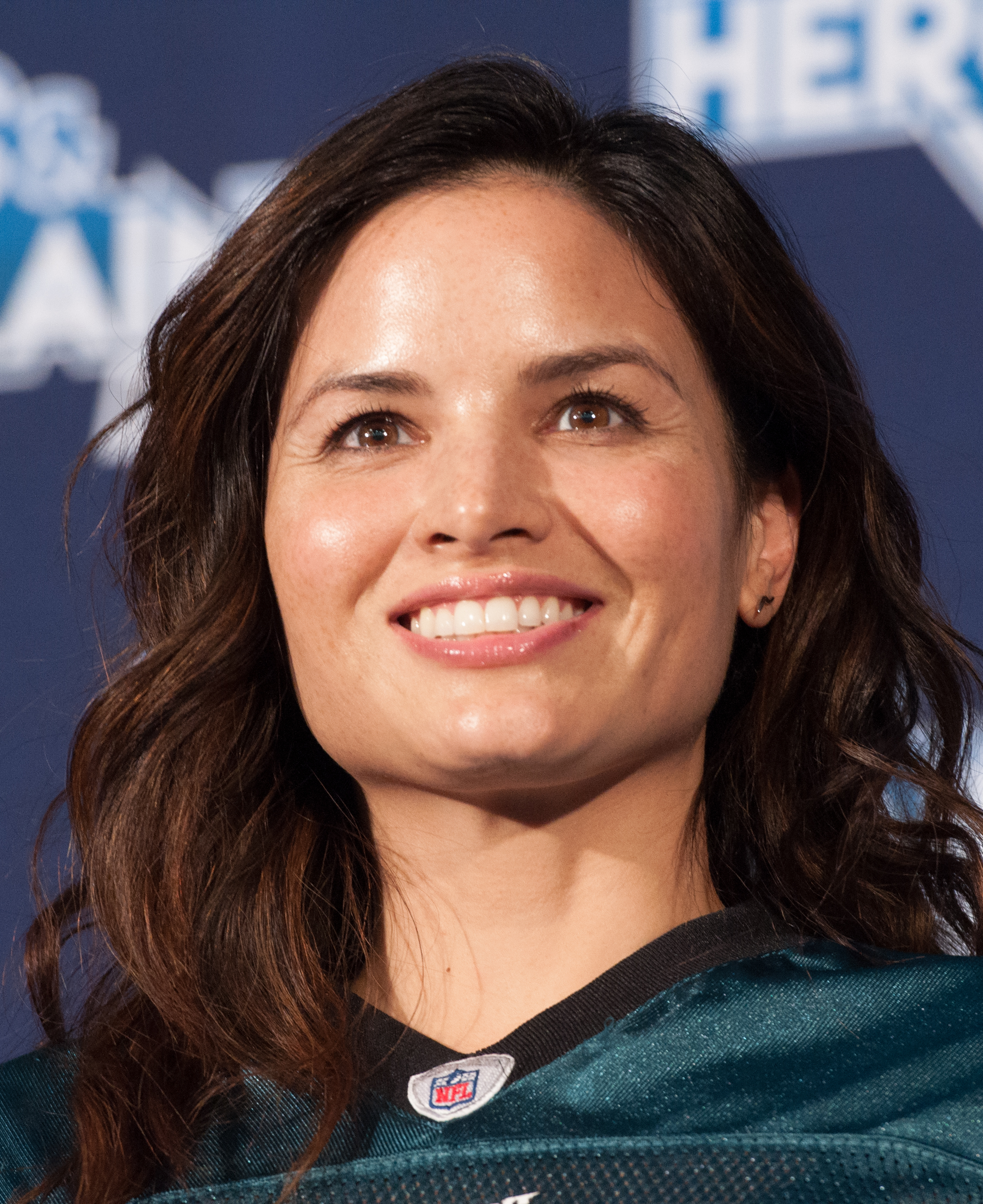
Katrina Law

- September 1
  - Jasmine Ann Allen, American-born Japanese voice actress, singer, and TV personality
  - Camile Velasco, Filipina-born actress
- September 2 – Allison Miller, actress
- September 3
  - Dominick Cruz, mixed martial artist
  - Shomari Figures, politician
  - Brian Stelter, journalist
- September 4
  - Jessa Anderson, Christian singer/songwriter
  - Morgan Garrett, actress
  - Kaillie Humphries, Olympic bobsledder
- September 5 – Tyler Colvin, baseball player
- September 6
  - Lynn Alvarez, mixed martial artist
  - Robert Ayers, football player
  - Gregg Cash, guitarist and music director
  - Hugh Cha, South Korean-born actor, singer, and dancer
  - Lauren Lapkus, actress and comedian
  - Mitch Moreland, baseball player
- September 7
  - Joe Craddock, football player and coach
  - Alyssa Diaz, actress
- September 8
  - Vanessa Baden, actress, writer, director and producer
  - Foo Conner, activist, entrepreneur, and journalist
  - Mina Kimes, sports journalist
- September 9
  - Martin Johnson, singer/songwriter, record producer, guitarist and frontman for Boys Like Girls
  - J. R. Smith, basketball player
- September 10
  - Matt Angle, baseball player and coach
  - Monica Lopera, Colombian-born actress
- September 11
  - Bobby Cassevah, baseball player
  - Chikezie, singer and American Idol contestant
- September 13 – Vella Lovell, actress
- September 14
  - Paolo Gregoletto, bassist for Trivium
  - Dilshad Vadsaria, actress
- September 15 – Chris Clemons, football player
- September 16
  - Houston Barrow, wrestler
  - Phil Sgrosso, guitarist for As I Lay Dying and Wovenwar (2013–2016)
  - Madeline Zima, actress
- September 17
  - Lindsay Adler, portrait and fashion photographer
  - Zacardi Cortez, gospel musician
  - Jon Walker, musician
- September 18
  - Megan Joy, singer
  - Chris Riggi, actor
- September 19
  - Zoë Chao, actress and screenwriter
  - Chase Rice, country singer-songwriter
- September 21
  - Ayad Al Adhamy, Bahraini-born multi-instrumentalist and record producer
  - Justin Chapman, author, journalist, and politician
  - Daron Clark, football player
- September 22
  - Damiano Carrara, Italian-book chef, restaurateur, and cookbook author
  - Rima Fakih, Lebanese-born model, philanthropist, wrestler and beauty pageant titleholder, Miss USA 2010
  - Shad White, politician
- September 23
  - Brian Brohm, football player
  - Joba Chamberlain, baseball player
  - Hasan Minhaj, comedian, political commentator and actor
- September 24
  - Dan Charles, mixed martial artist
  - Paige Miles, singer
- September 27
  - John Burris, politician
  - Jamar Butler, basketball player
  - Grace Helbig, YouTube personality, podcast host and comedian
- September 28 – Martin Courtney, singer and frontman for Real Estate
- September 29
  - Andrew Forsman, drummer for The Fall of Troy
  - Calvin Johnson, football player
- September 30
  - Chris Chamberlain, football player
  - Katrina Law, actress

=== October ===
Ryan M. Pitts

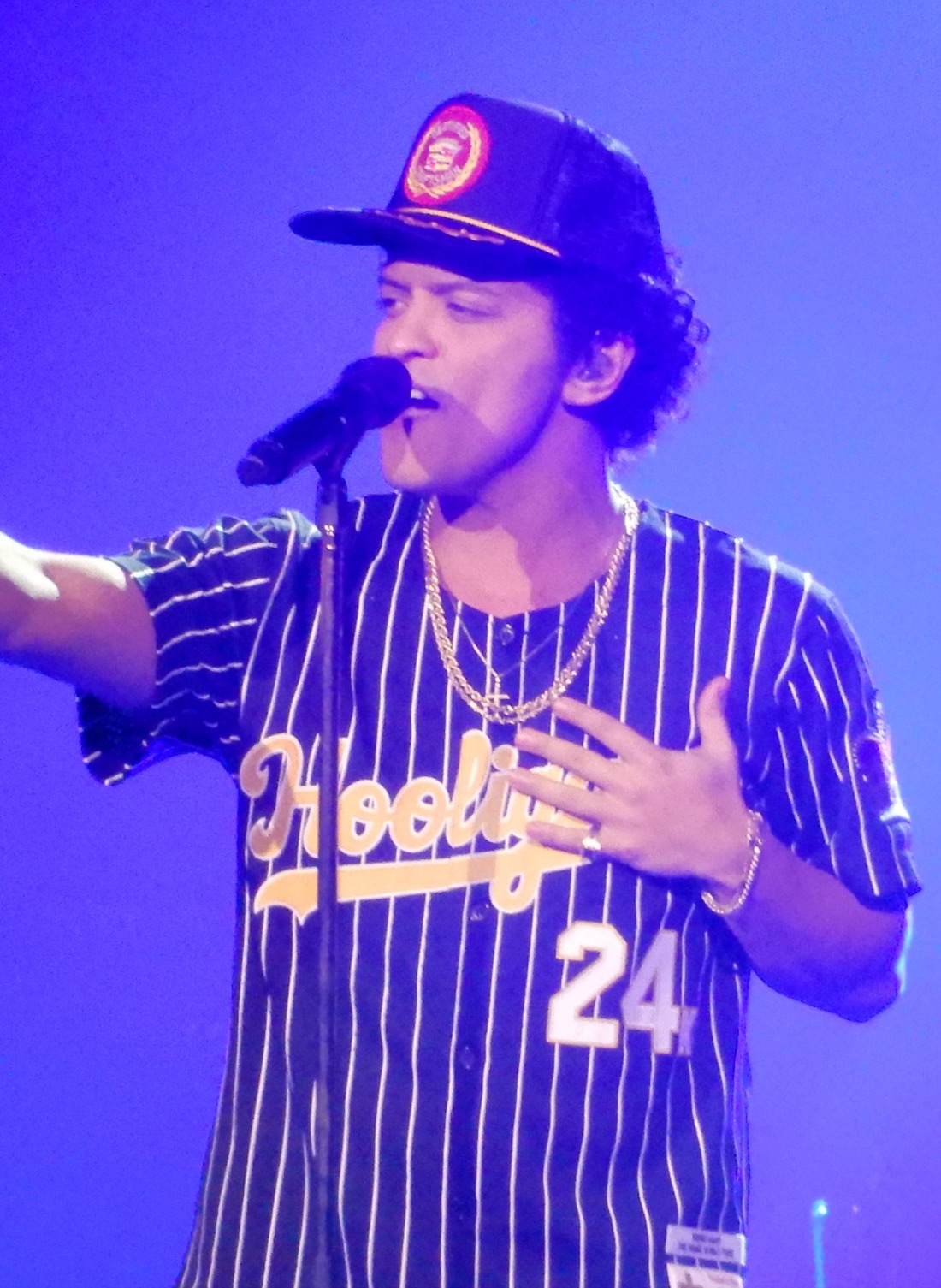
Bruno Mars

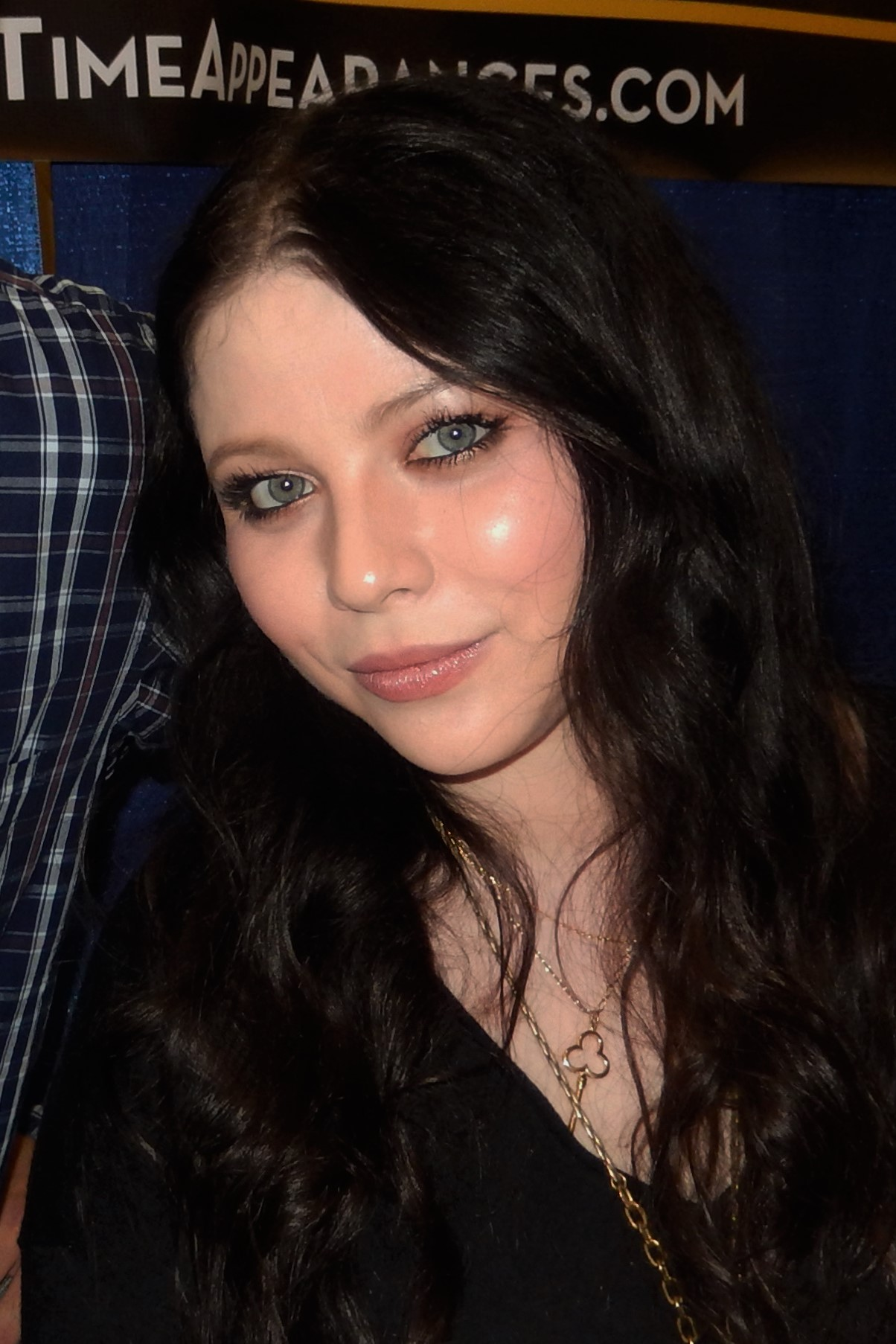
Michelle Trachtenberg

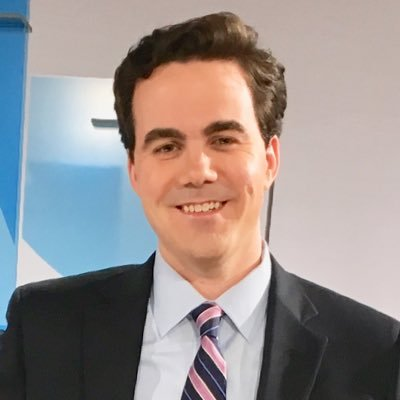
Robert Costa

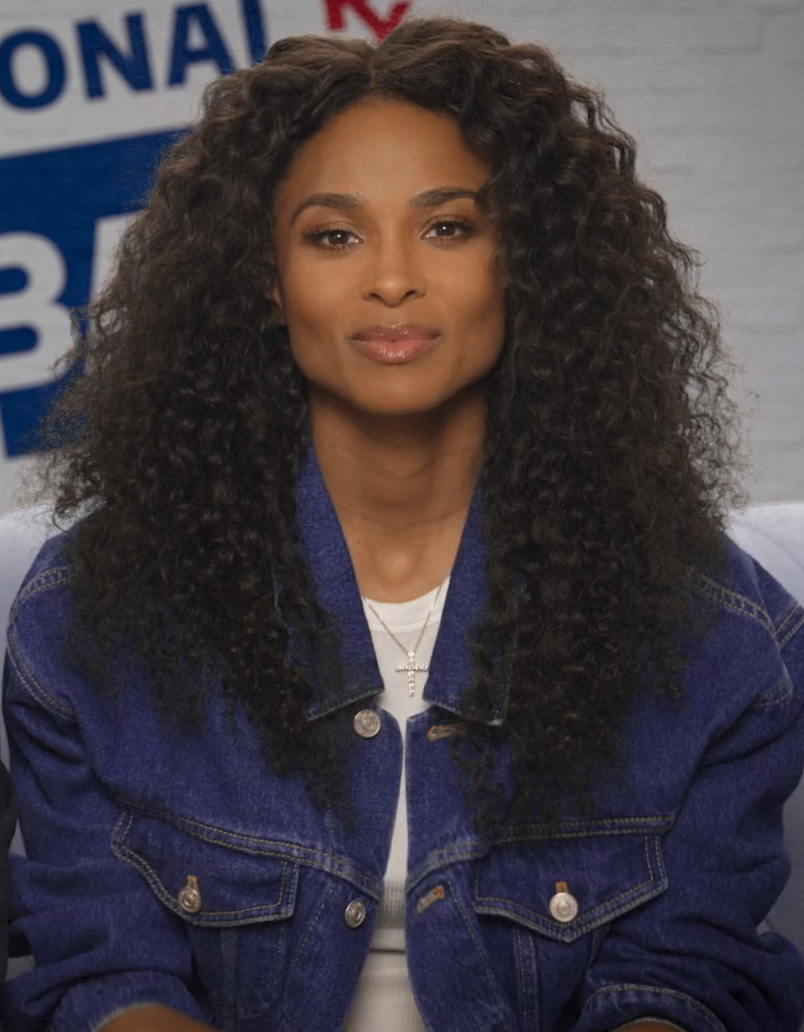
Ciara

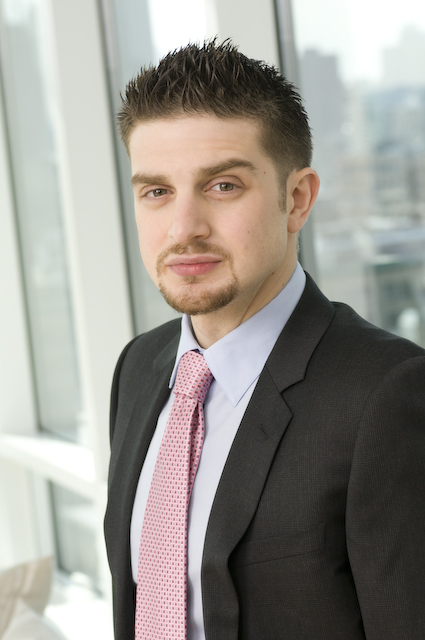
Alexander Soros

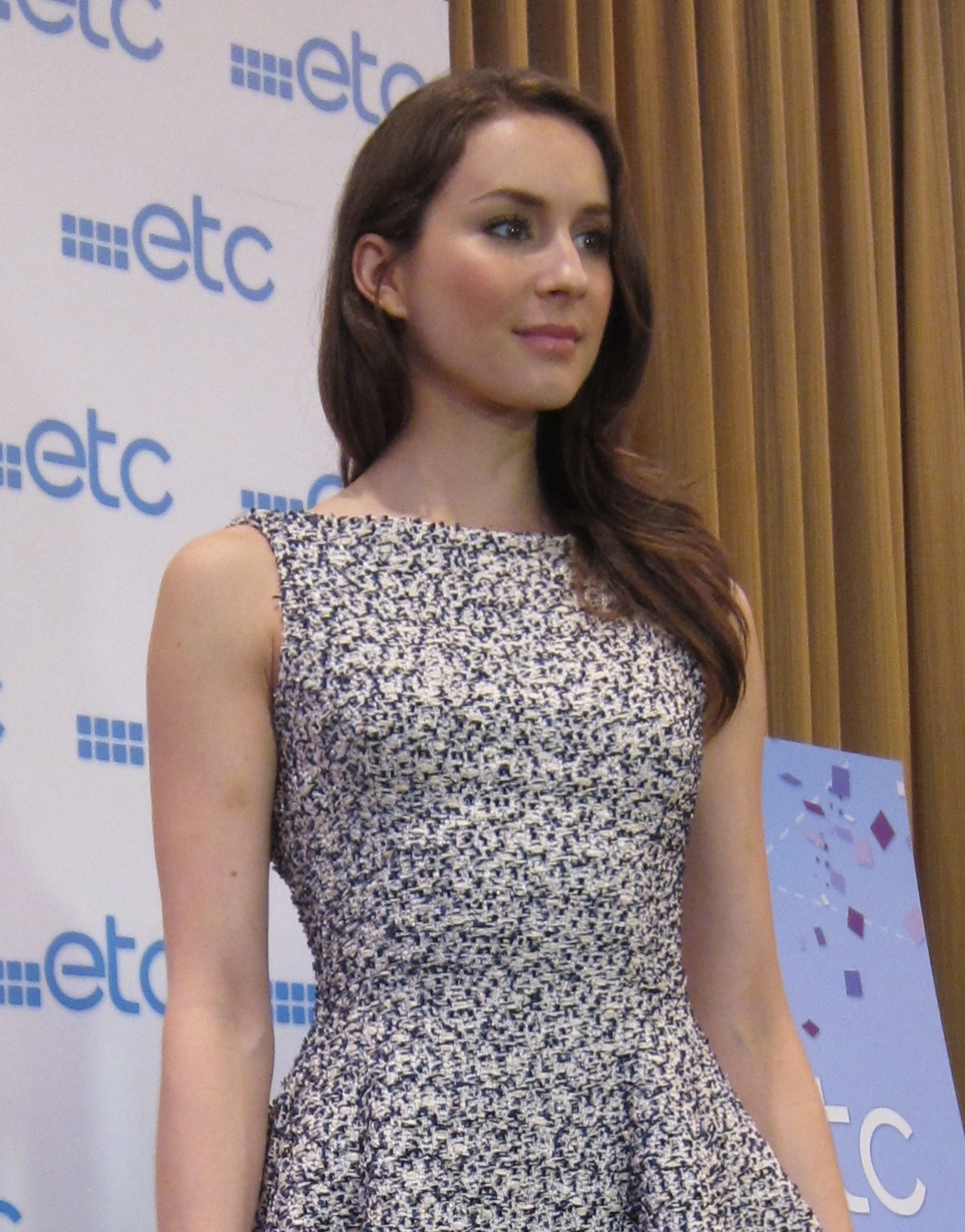
Troian Bellisario

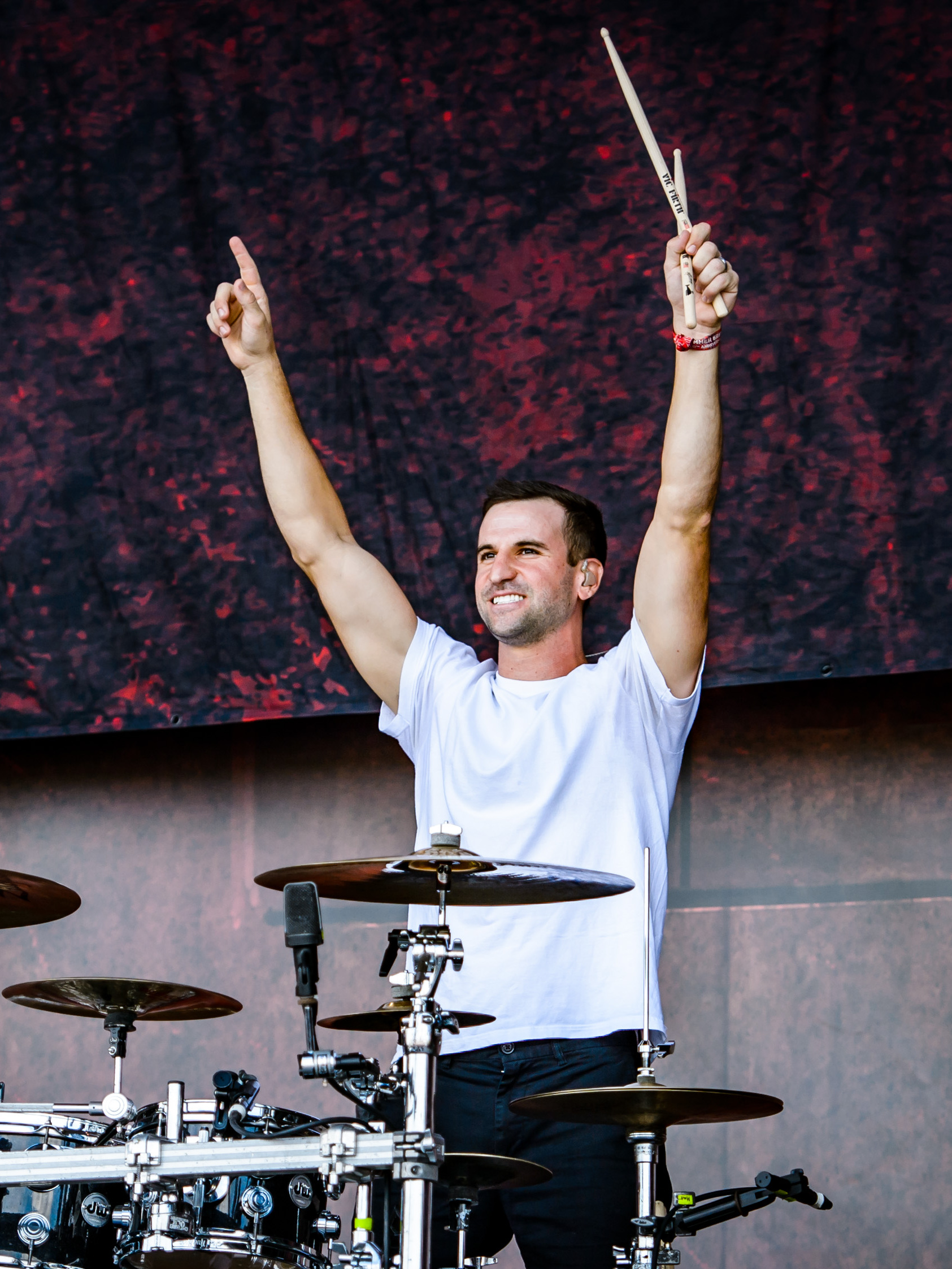
Matt Greiner

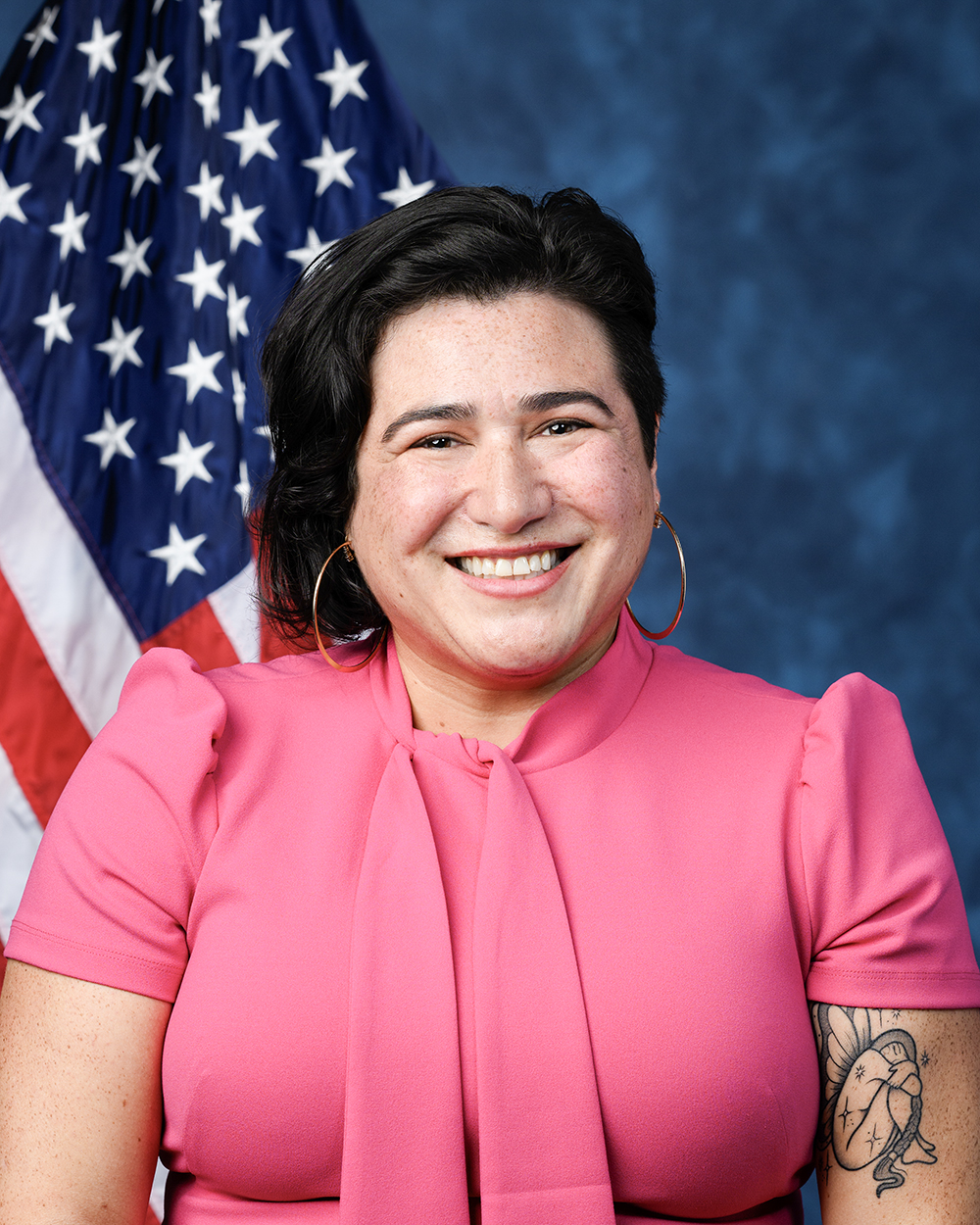
Emily Randall

- October 1
  - Mitch Atkins, baseball player
  - Porcelain Black, industrial pop singer/songwriter
  - Chris Clark, football player
  - Ryan M. Pitts, U.S. Army soldier in Afghan War, Medal of Honor Recipient
  - Sicily Sewell, actress
- October 2
  - Robbie Agnone, football player
  - Tara Allain, beauty pageant winner, Miss Maine 2007
  - M. Hasna Maznavi, writer, filmmaker, and activist (d. 2025)
- October 3
  - Jason Anick, jazz musician
  - Courtney Lee, basketball player
- October 4
  - Brad Bell, television producer, screenwriter, actor, musician and comic book author
  - Clef nite, Nigerian-born guitarist
- October 5 – Brooke Valentine, singer
- October 6
  - Tahanie Aboushi, civil rights lawyer and political candidate
  - Sylvia Fowles, basketball player
- October 7 – Evan Longoria, baseball player
- October 8
  - Greg Carr, football player
  - Max Crumm, actor and singer
  - Bruno Mars, singer-songwriter, producer and actor
- October 9
  - Charles Alexander, football player
  - Nathan Crumpton, Olympic skeleton racer
- October 10
  - Tasneem Alsultan, photographer, artist, and speaker
  - Jaremi Carey, actor, streamer, singer, cosplay artist, and drag performer
  - Aaron Himelstein, actor
- October 11 – Michelle Trachtenberg, actress, producer and singer (d. 2025)
- October 12
  - Michelle Carter, Olympic shot-putter
  - Simeon Castille, football player
- October 14
  - Daniel Clark, American-born Canadian actor, producer, and reporter
  - Robert Costa, political reporter
  - Justin Forsett, football player
- October 15
  - Arron Afflalo, basketball player
  - Cory Asbury, Christian musician and pastor
  - Kevin Craft, football player
- October 16
  - Dylan Golden Aycock, guitarist
  - Ben Barter, New Zealand-born drummer
- October 18
  - Yoenis Céspedes, Cuban-born baseball player
  - Andrew Garcia, singer
- October 19 – Ian Calderon, politician
- October 20
  - AnonymousCulture, rapper
  - Jennifer Freeman, actress
- October 21 – Quinton Culberson, football player
- October 22
  - Zac Hanson, drummer for Hanson
  - Deontay Wilder, boxer
- October 23
  - Masiela Lusha, Albanian-born actress, poet and humanitarian
  - Adrian Perkins, politician, mayor of Shreveport, Louisiana
- October 24 – Donald Cowart, steeplechase runner
- October 25
  - Colt Anderson, football player
  - Ciara, singer
  - John Robinson, actor
  - Christopher Sean, actor
- October 27
  - Briana Lane, actress and musician
  - Alexander Soros, philanthropist, son of George Soros
- October 28
  - Troian Bellisario, actress
  - Anthony Fantano, music critic
  - Matt Greiner, drummer for August Burns Red
- October 29 – Adam Cappa, Christian rock singer/songwriter
- October 30 – Emily Randall, politician
- October 31
  - Kerron Clement, Trinidadian-born hurdler and sprinter
  - Paul Cram, actor
  - Dan Cramer, mixed martial artist
  - Kether Donohue, actress and singer

=== November ===
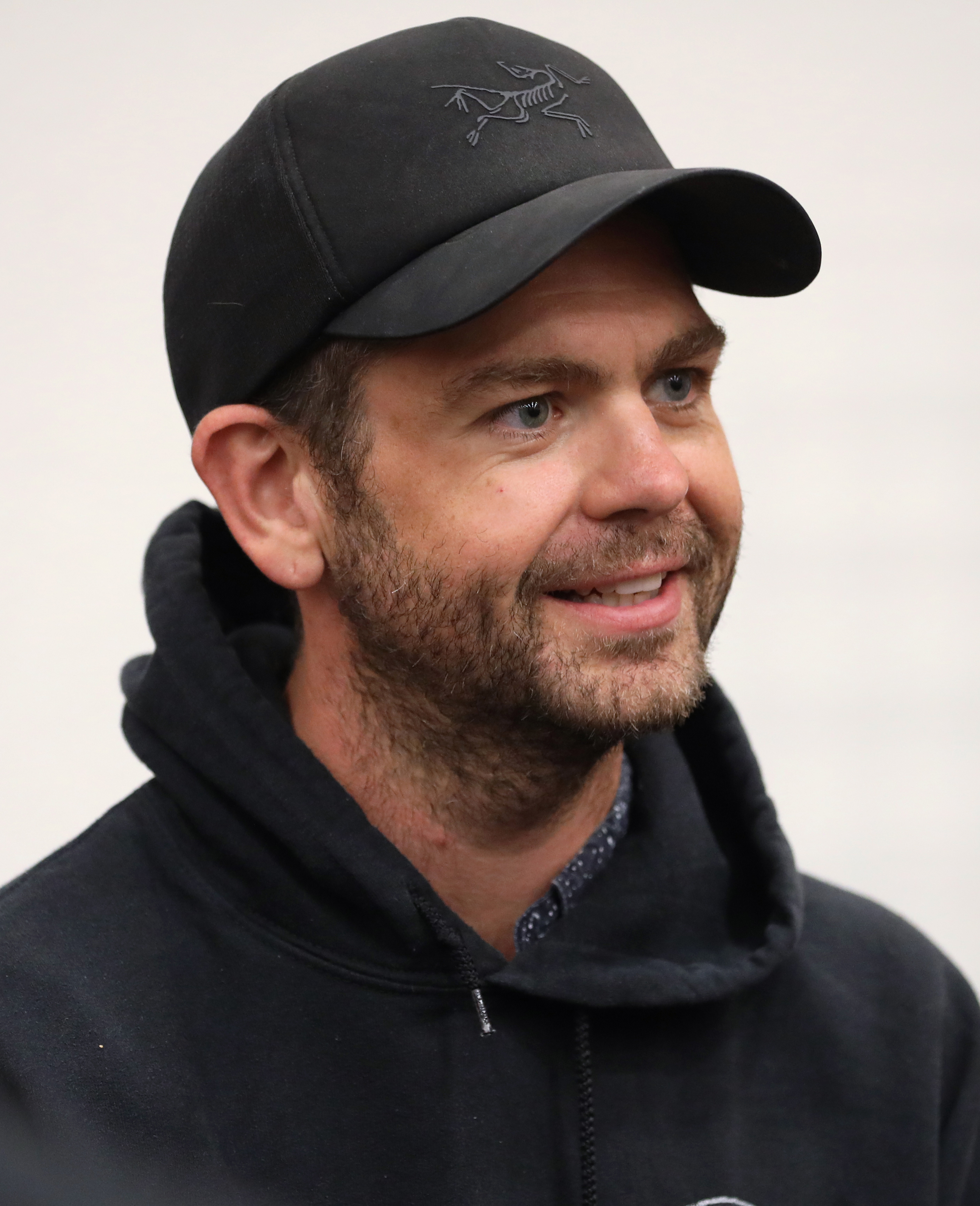
Jack Osbourne

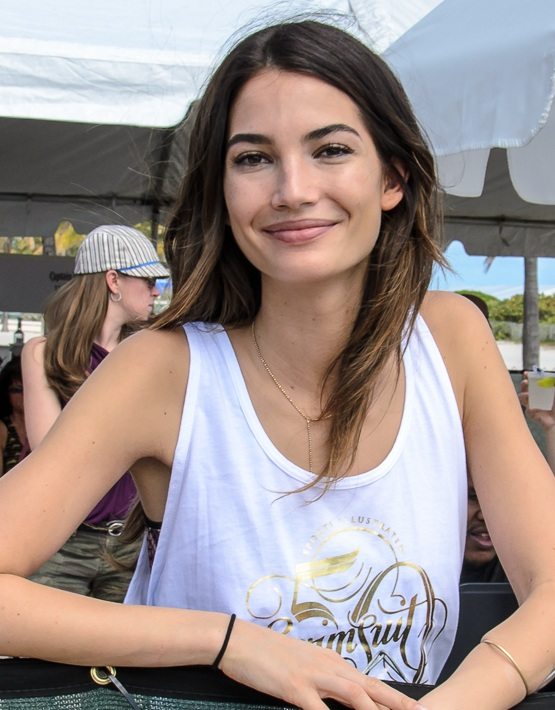
Lily Aldridge

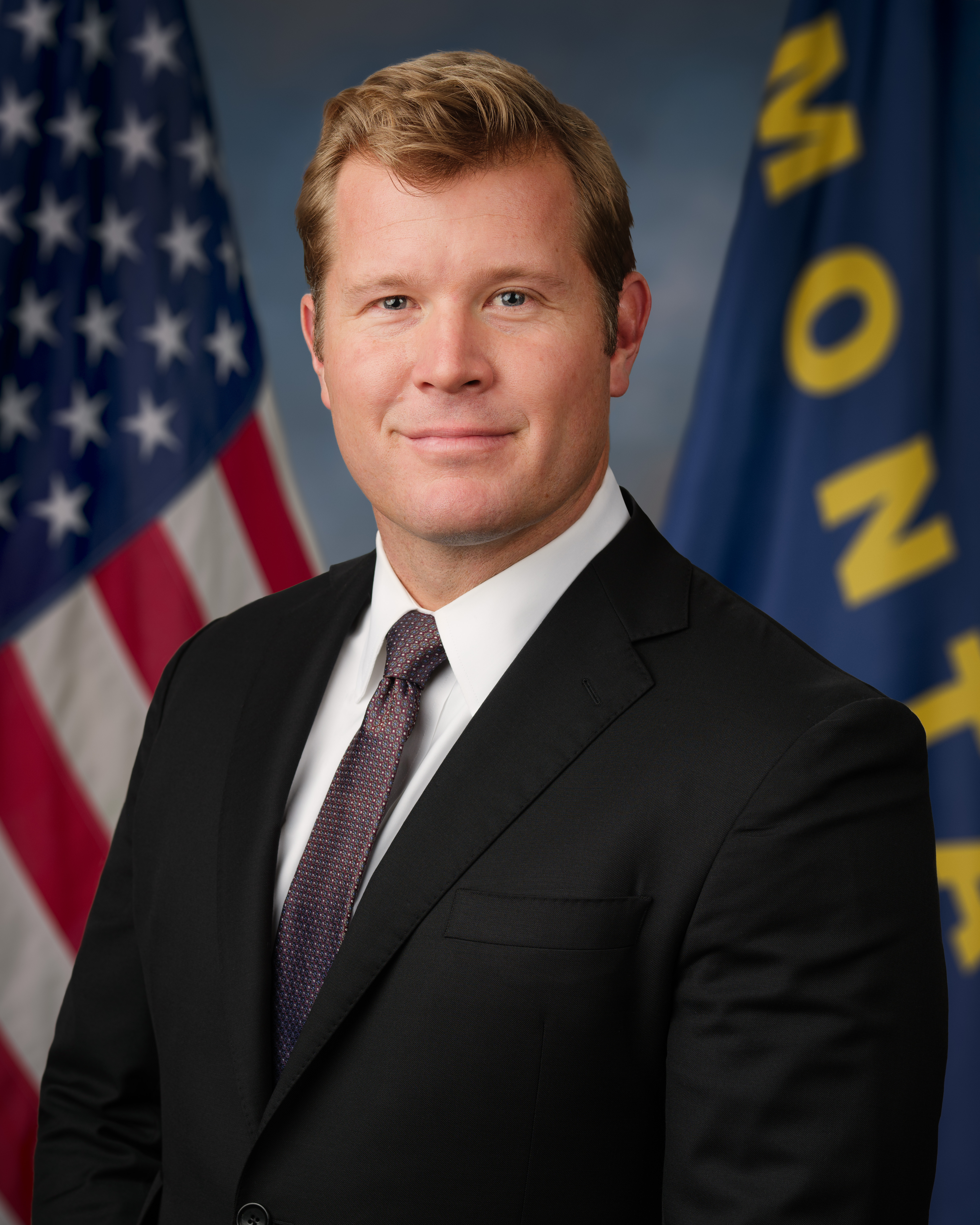
Tim Sheehy

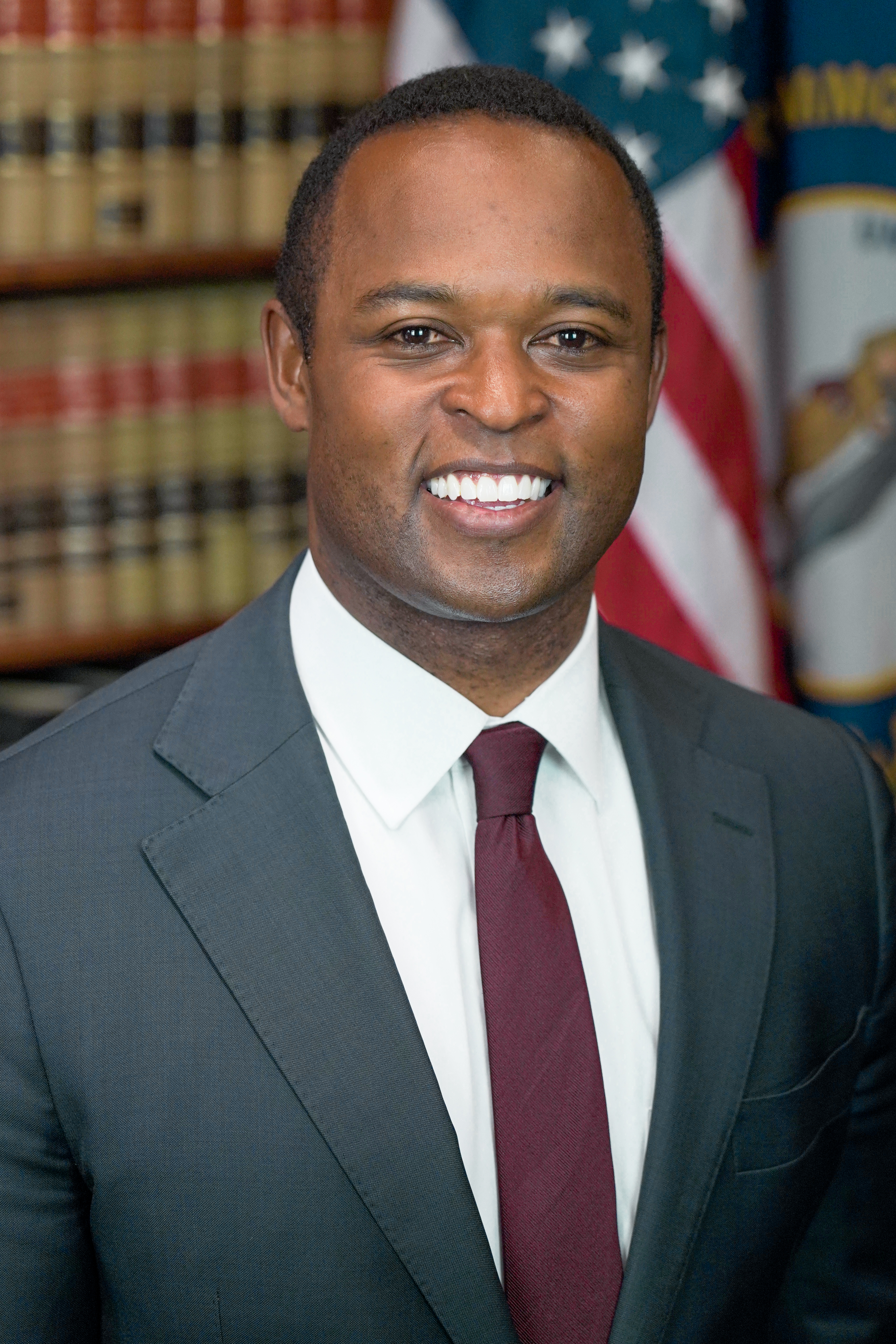
Daniel Cameron

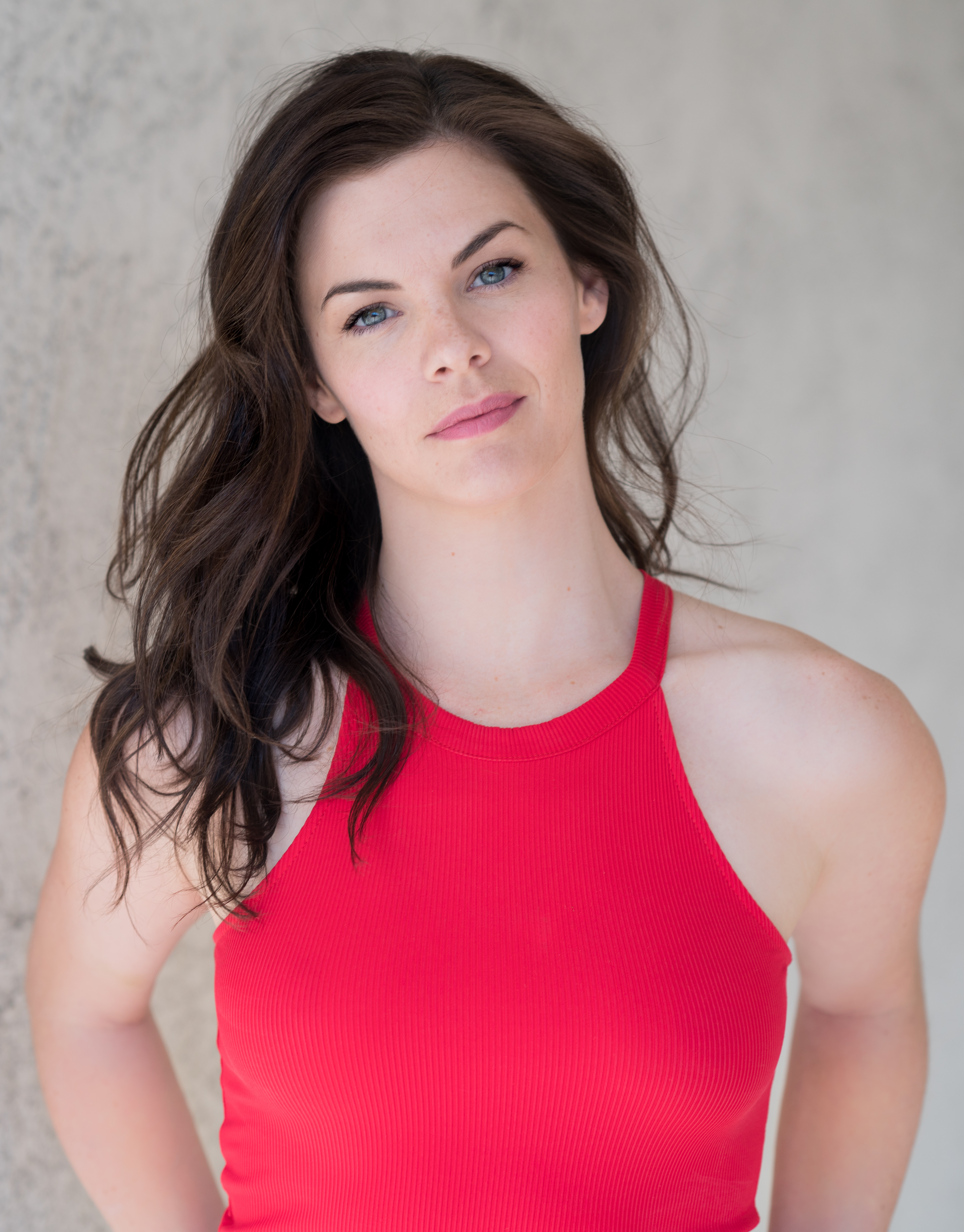
Haley Webb

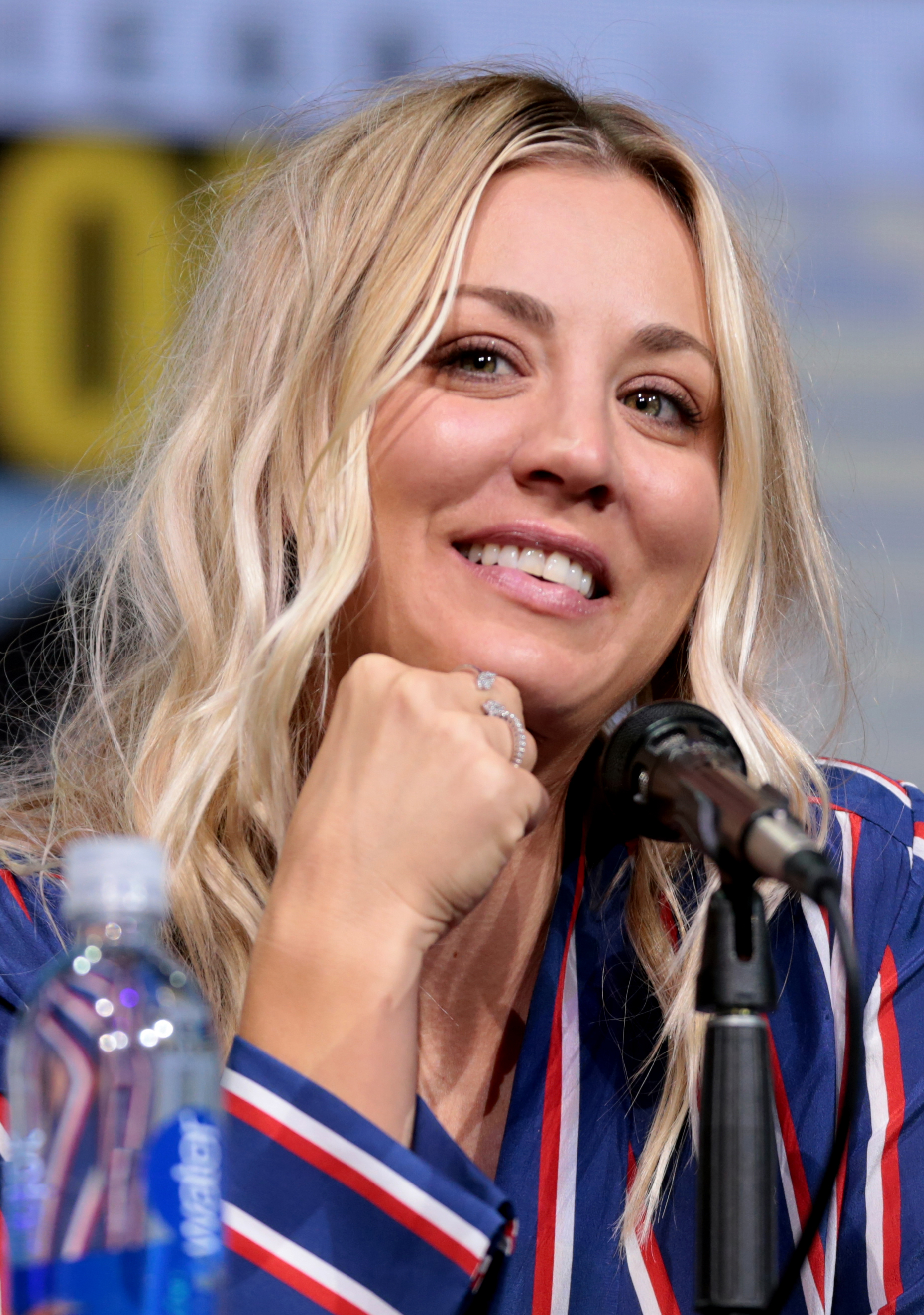
Kaley Cuoco

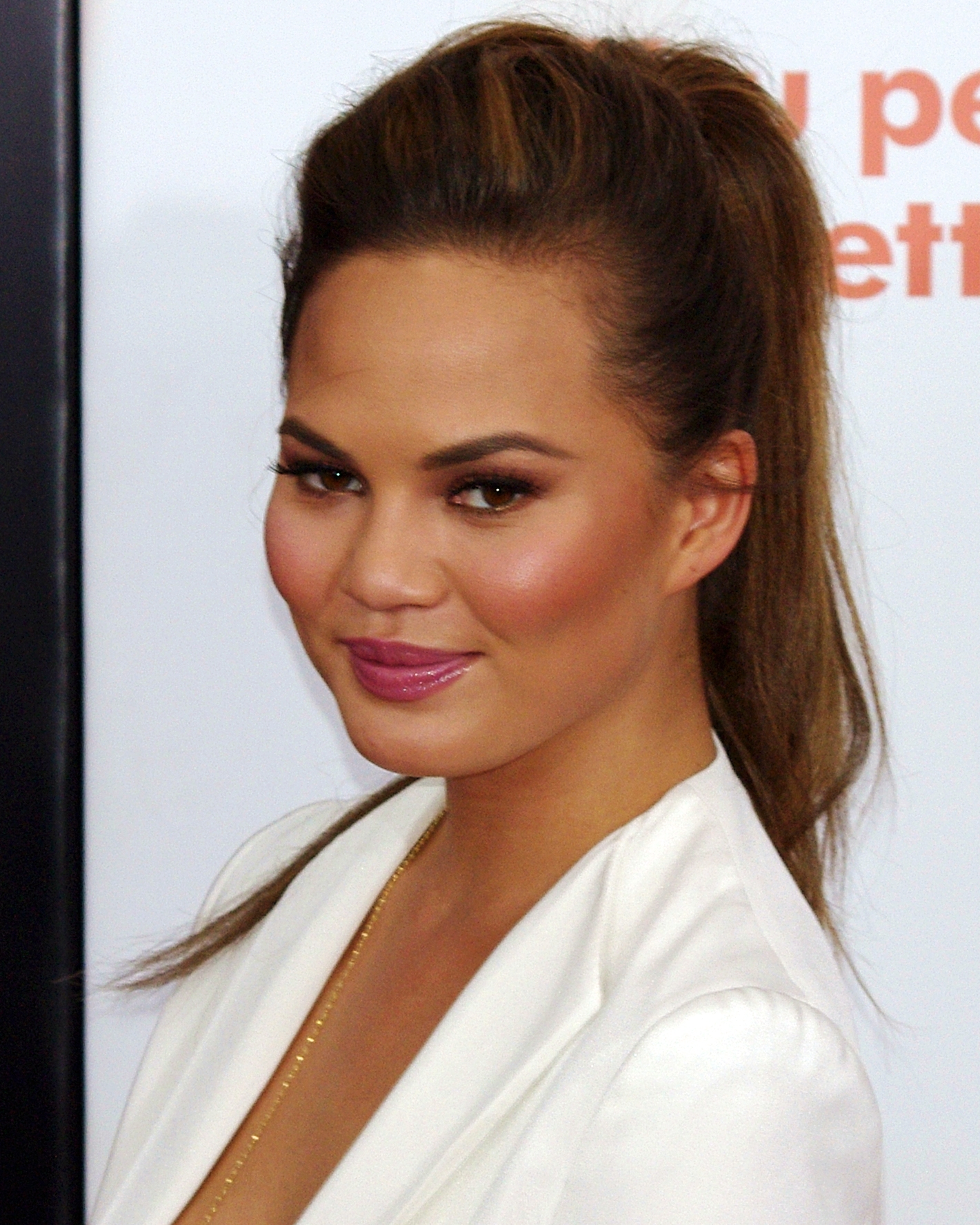
Chrissy Teigen

- November 2
  - Danny Amendola, football player
  - Anthony Collins, football player
  - Dan Connor, football player
  - Josh Grelle, actor
- November 3 – Tyler Hansbrough, basketball player
- November 4
  - Tom Crabtree, football player
  - Victoria Leigh Soto, teacher, Sandy Hook Elementary School shooting victim (k. 2012)
- November 5
  - Erica Carney, racing cyclist
  - Elizabeth Rice, actress
- November 6 – Shayne Lamas, reality television personality and actress
- November 7
  - Adrian Arrington, football player
  - Mitch Harris, baseball player
- November 8
  - Mark Asper, football player
  - Liam Coen, football player and coach
  - Jack Osbourne, English-born television personality
- November 10 – Pete Andrelczyk, baseball player
- November 11
  - Onision, controversial YouTuber
  - Pat Carroll, soccer player
  - Jessica Sierra, singer
- November 12 – Arianny Celeste, model and actress
- November 13
  - Michael Bennett, football player
  - Asdrúbal Cabrera, Venezuelan-born baseball player
  - Giovonnie Samuels, actress
  - Kit Williamson, actor and filmmaker
- November 14
  - Mara Abbott, Olympic cyclist
  - Sage Canaday, long-distance runner
  - Spencer Charnas, singer and frontman for Ice Nine Kills
  - Odin Lloyd, murder victim (d. 2013)
- November 15
  - Lily Aldridge, model
  - Richard Clebert, football player
  - Charron Fisher, basketball player
  - Nick Fradiani, singer
  - Jeffree Star, YouTuber, entrepreneur, makeup artist and singer-songwriter
- November 18
  - Allyson Felix, Olympic sprinter
  - Tim Sheehy, Navy SEAL and politician
  - Christian Siriano, fashion designer
- November 19 – Eve Carson, murder victim (d. 2008)
- November 20 – Dan Byrd, actor
- November 21 – Mark Cochran, politician
- November 22
  - Daniel Cameron, politician
  - Antonietta Collins, Mexican-born sportscaster
- November 23
  - Troy Ave, rapper
  - Mike Tolbert, football player
- November 25
  - Dan Carpenter, football player
  - Haley Webb, actress and filmmaker
- November 26 – Matt Carpenter, baseball player
- November 29 – Jamar Adams, football player
- November 30
  - Casely, singer
  - Gia Crovatin, actress
  - Kaley Cuoco, actress
  - Chrissy Teigen, model

=== December ===
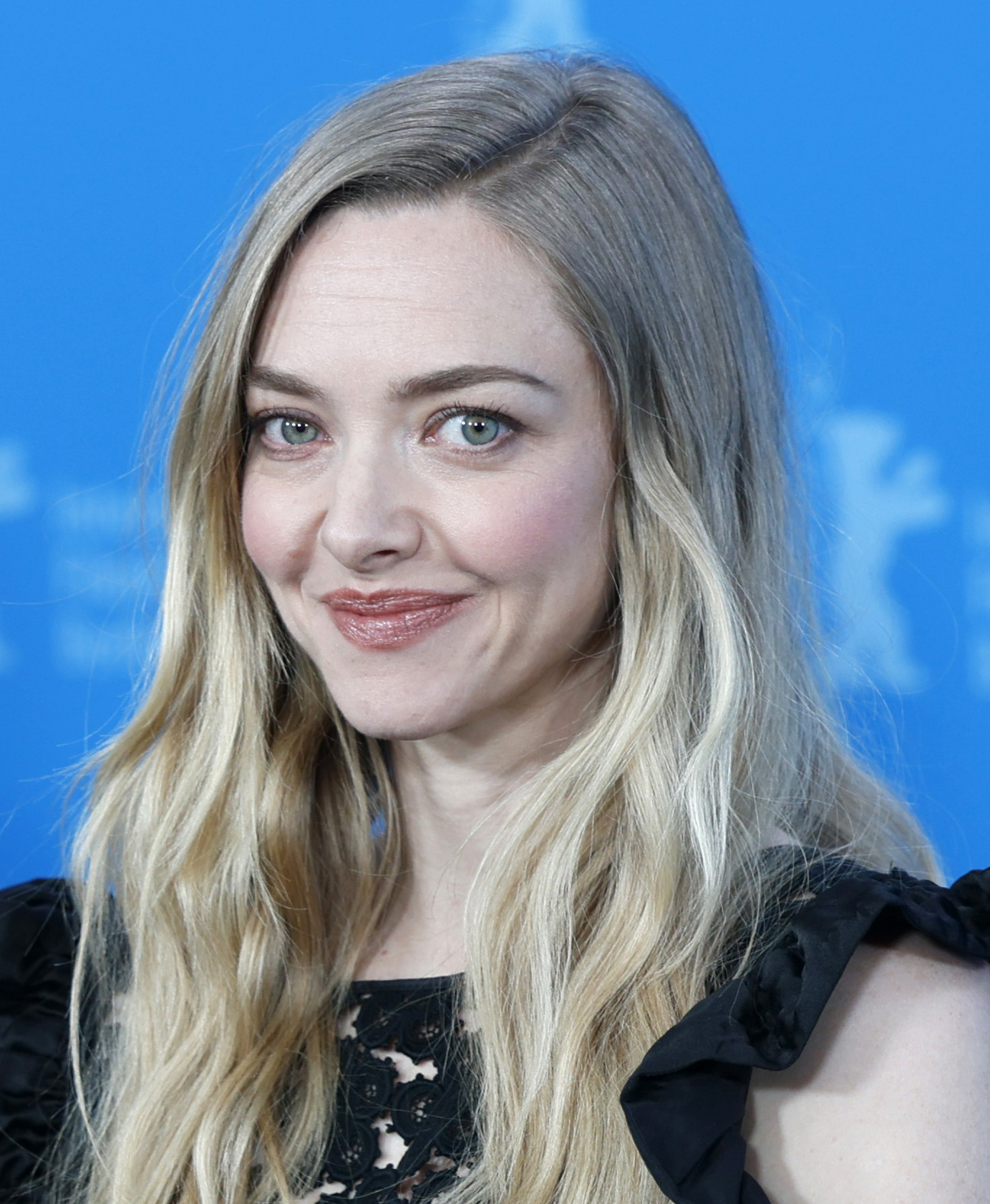
Amanda Seyfried

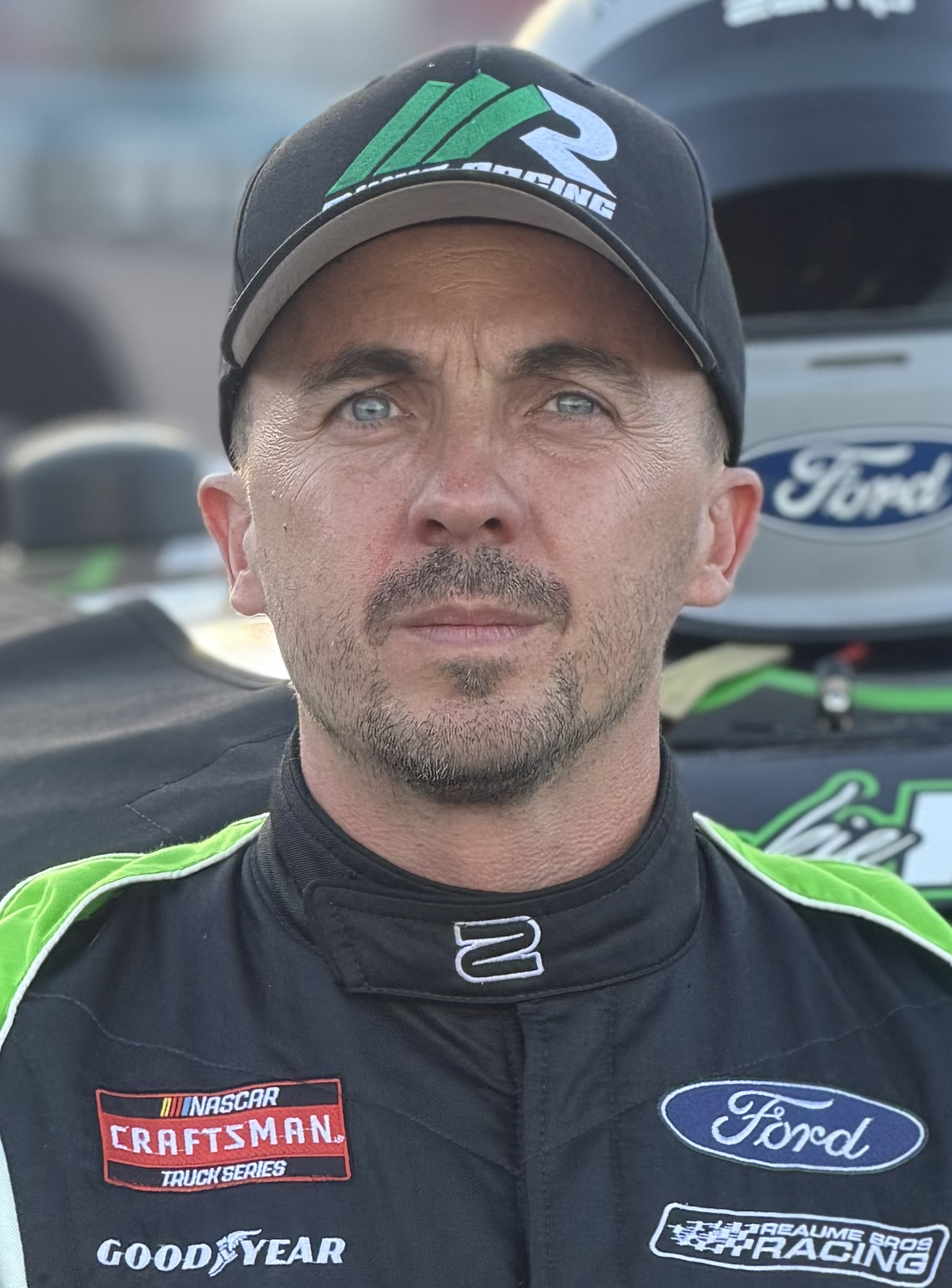
Frankie Muniz

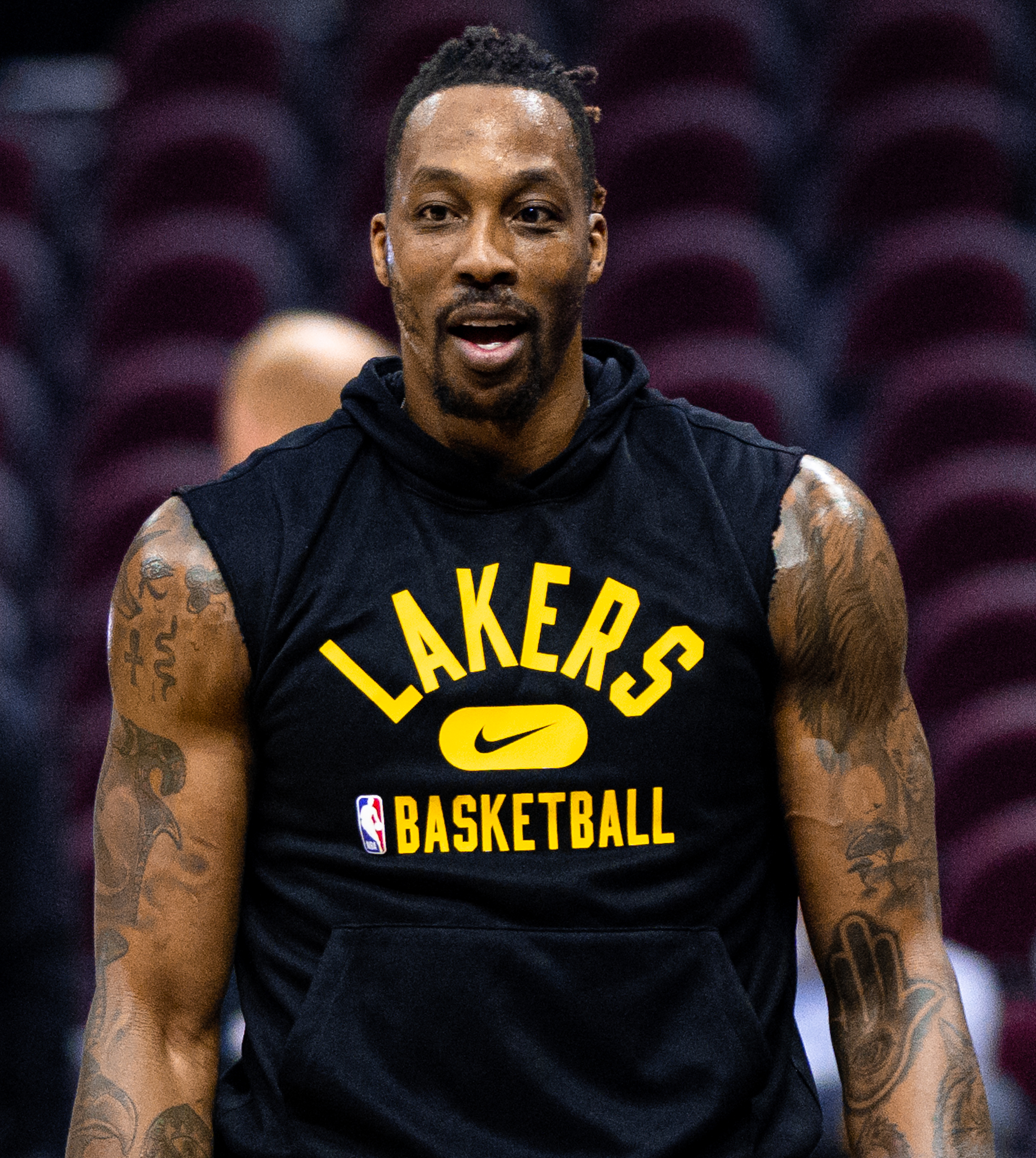
Dwight Howard

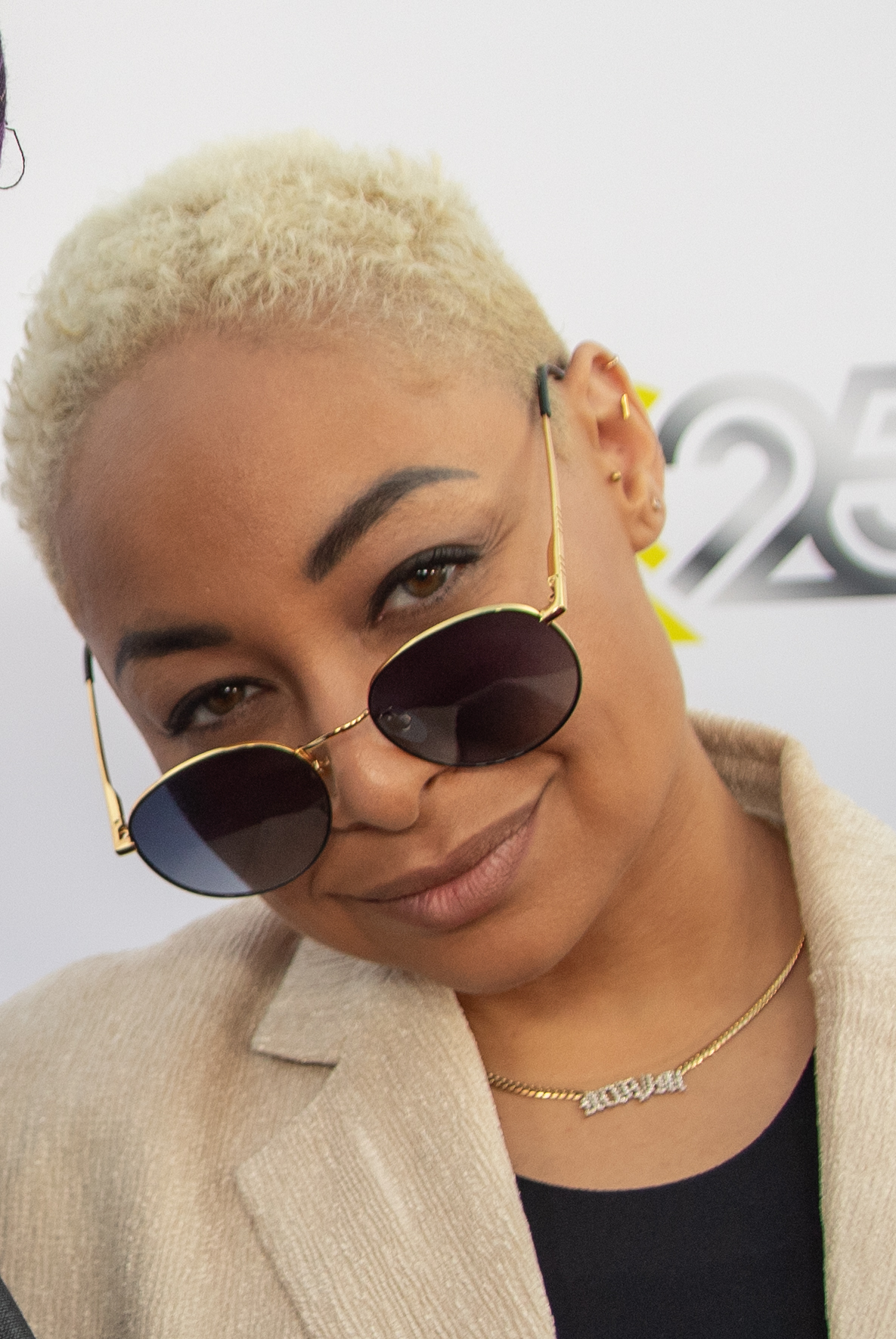
Raven-Symoné

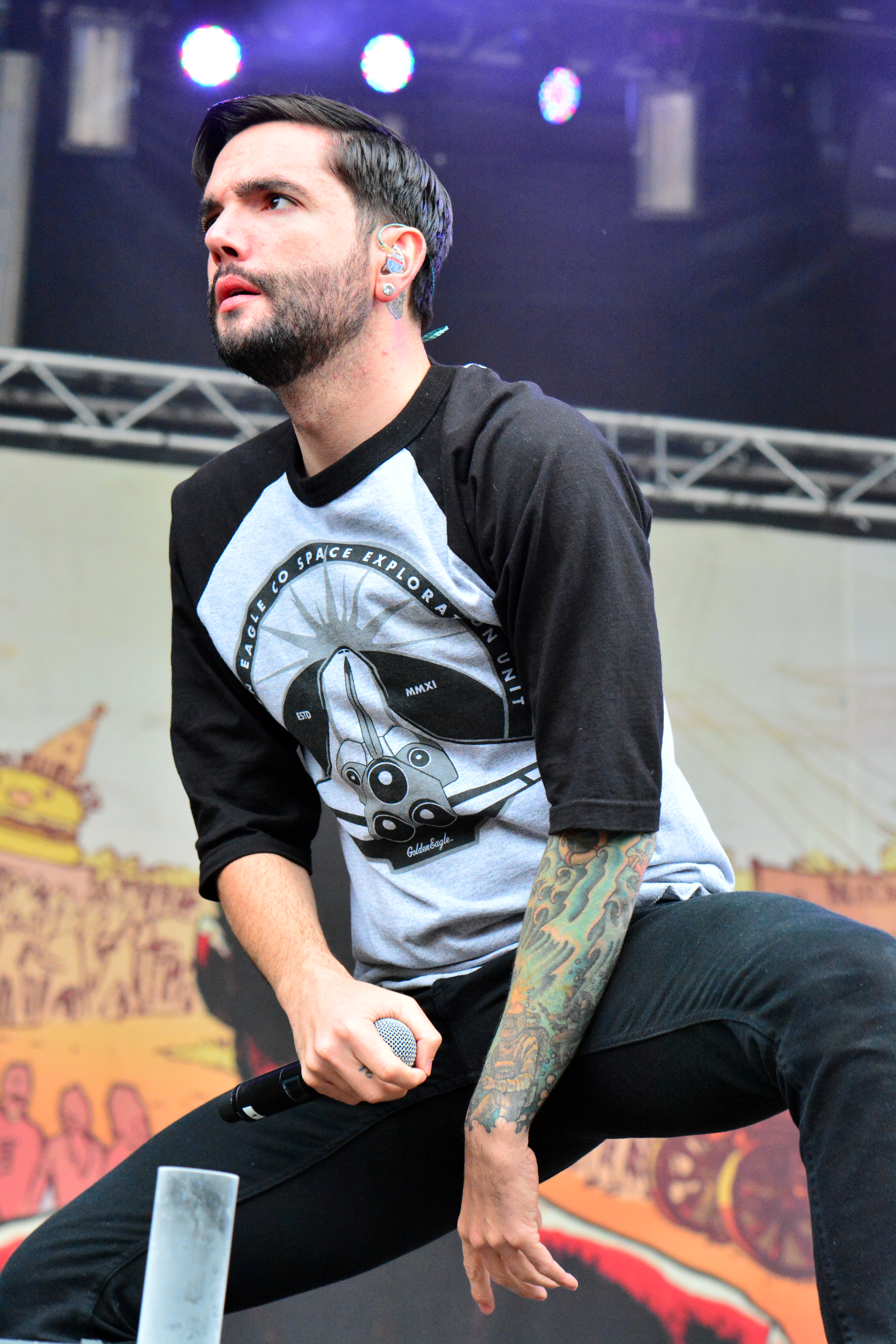
Jeremy McKinnon

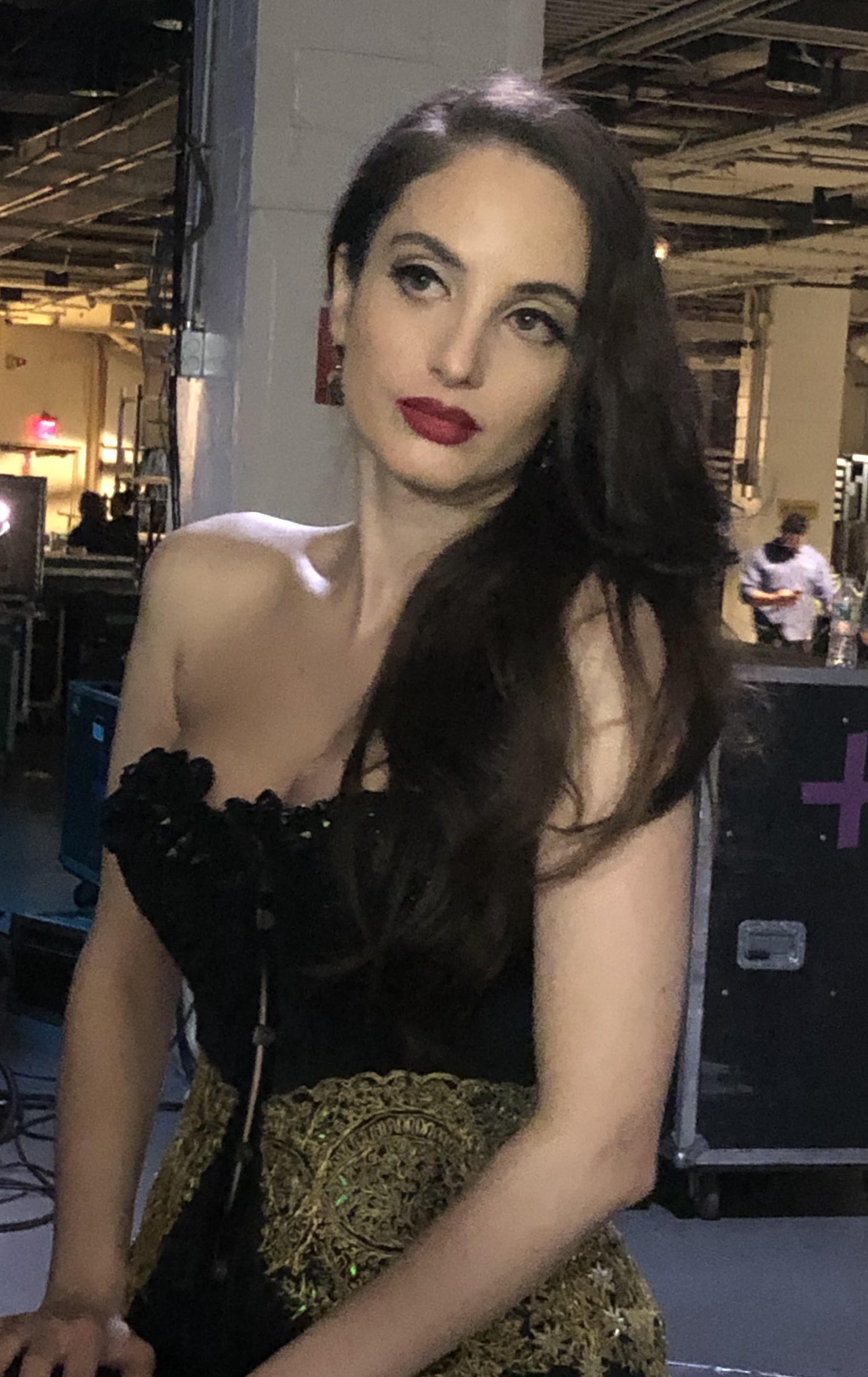
Alexa Ray Joel

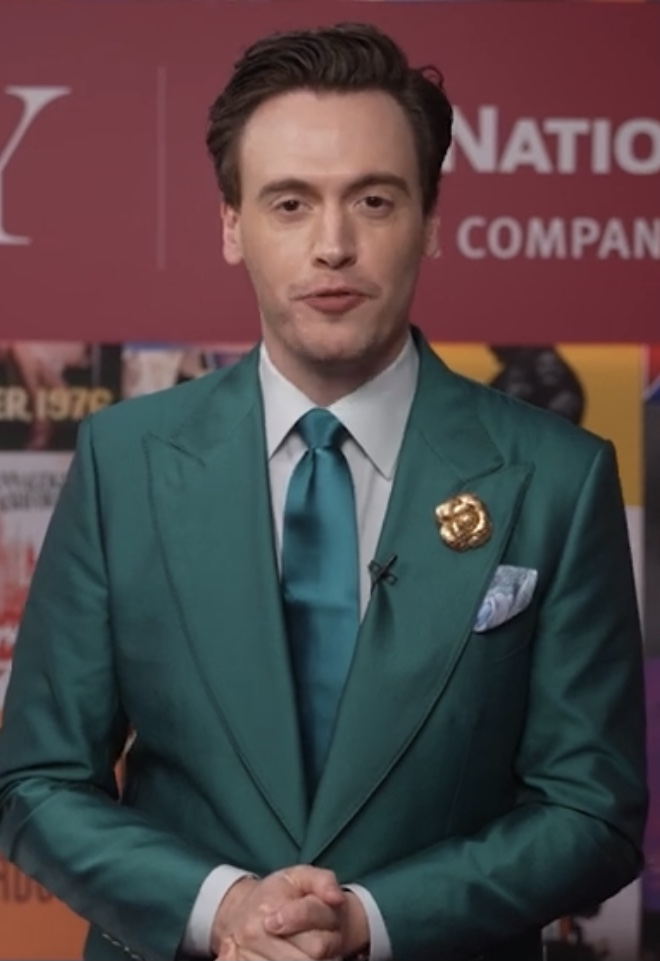
Erich Bergen

- December 1
  - John Coughlin, skater (d. 2019)
  - Philip DeFranco, YouTube personality and vlogger
  - Ilfenesh Hadera, actress
  - Janelle Monáe, R&B/Soul Musician
  - Svetlana Shusterman, Ukrainian-born television personality
- December 2 – Samuel Charles, football player
- December 3 – Amanda Seyfried, actress and singer-songwriter
- December 4 – Ronnie Ortiz-Magro, TV personality
- December 5
  - Ryan Additon, MLB umpire
  - Adam Anderson, monster truck driver
  - Kristan Hawkins, activist
  - Frankie Muniz, actor, musician, writer, producer and racing driver
  - Will Swan, guitarist for Dance Gavin Dance
- December 6 – Todd Duffee, mixed martial artist
- December 7
  - S. A. Chakraborty, writer
  - Jon Moxley, wrestler
- December 8
  - Xavier Carter, sprinter
  - Josh Donaldson, baseball player
  - Dwight Howard, basketball player
- December 10
  - Brandon Anderson, football player
  - Edmund Entin, actor
  - Matt Forte, football player
  - T. J. Hensick, hockey player
  - Meghan Linsey, singer/songwriter
  - Raven-Symoné, actress, singer and dancer
- December 11
  - Andre Douglas, astronaut and engineer
  - Samantha Steele, sportscaster
- December 12
  - Pat Calathes, American-born Greek basketball player
  - Chris Jennings, football player
  - Erika Van Pelt, singer
  - David Veikune, football player
  - Daniel Williams, drummer for The Devil Wears Prada (d. 2025)
- December 16 – Amanda Setton, actress
- December 17 – Jeremy McKinnon, singer/songwriter, record producer and frontman for A Day to Remember
- December 18
  - Aris Ambríz, boxer
  - Tara Conner, model, television personality, beauty pageant titleholder, and Miss USA 2006
- December 19
  - Katherine Chappell, film visual effects editor (d. 2015)
  - Shane Bitney Crone, filmmaker, writer and advocate for LGBT rights
  - Christina Loukas, Olympic diver
- December 20 – Paul Wandtke, metalcore drummer
- December 21
  - Ricky Legere, mixed martial artist
  - James Stewart Jr., motorcycle racer
- December 23 – Arcángel, reggaeton singer
- December 24 – Edward Aschoff, sports reporter (d. 2019)
- December 25 – Miro, Bulgarian-born wrestler
- December 26
  - Beth Behrs, actress
  - Chris Carpenter, baseball player
  - Mikal Cronin, musician and songwriter
- December 27
  - Halley Gross, screenwriter
  - Paul Stastny, Canadian-born hockey player
- December 28
  - Dan Amboyer, actor
  - Taryn Terrell, wrestler
- December 29 – Alexa Ray Joel, singer/songwriter and pianist
- December 30
  - Samuel Adams, composer
  - Ryan Ammerman, volleyball player
  - Hunter Cantwell, football player
  - Anna Wood, actress
- December 31
  - Antwan Applewhite, football player
  - Erich Bergen, actor
  - Brennen Carvalho, football player
  - Jonathan Horton, Olympic gymnast

=== Full date unknown ===
- Khalik Allah, filmmaker and photographer
- Catrina Allen, disc thrower
- Jojo Anavim, contemporary visual artist
- Timo Andres, composer and pianist
- J. J. Anselmi, writer and musician
- Jennifer Arcuri, technology entrepreneur
- Alex Askew, politician
- Dorielle Caimi, artist
- Chris Campanioni, writer
- Alana I. Capria, writer
- Ana Caraiani, Romanian-born mathematician
- Charlene Carruthers, LGBT activist and author
- Greg Chevalier, soccer player
- Stephen Christy, producer, entertainment executive, and editor
- Alex Clark, comedian, animator, YouTuber, and juggler
- Zinzi Clemmons, writer
- Stephanie Cmar, chef
- Kevin Michael Connolly, photographer
- Moogega Cooper, astronomer
- Kimberly Corban, rape survivor and rape victim advocate

== Deaths ==
- January 7 – Ruth Godfrey, actress (b. 1922)
- January 13 – Carol Wayne, actress (b. 1942)
- January 19 – Eric Voegelin, German-American philosopher (b. 1901)
- January 20 – Gillis William Long, politician (b. 1923)
- January 21
  - James Beard, chef, cookbook author, and television personality (b. 1903)
  - Eddie Graham, professional wrestler (b. 1930)
- January 28 – Wade Nichols, actor (b. 1946)
- January 30 – Benedict Garmisa, politician (born 1913)
- February 8 – Marvin Miller, actor (b. 1913)
- February 12 – Nicholas Colasanto, actor and director (b. 1924)
- February 18 – Randolph Edgar Haugan, author, editor and publisher (b. 1902)
- February 20 – Clarence Nash, voice actor and impressionist (b. 1904)
- February 21 – John G. Trump, electrical engineer, inventor, and physicist (b. 1907)
- February 22
  - Alexander Scourby, actor (b. 1913)
  - Efrem Zimbalist, Russian-American composer, conductor, and violinist (b. 1889)
- February 27
  - Henry Cabot Lodge Jr., politician (b. 1902)
  - David Huffman, actor (b. 1945)
- March 8 – Edward Andrews, actor (b. 1914)
- March 12 – Eugene Ormandy, Hungarian-born American conductor and violinist (b. 1899)
- March 13 – Annette Hanshaw, singer (b. 1901)
- April 1 – Douglass Wallop, author and playwright (b. 1920)
- April 8 – John Frederick Coots, songwriter (b. 1897)
- April 22 – Paul H. Emmett, American chemical engineer (b. 1900)
- April 23
  - Sam Ervin, U.S. Senator and politician (b. 1896)
  - Kent Smith, American actor (b. 1907)
- April 24 – Mildred W. Pelzer, American artist (b. 1889)
- April 25 – Richard Haydn, English-born American comic actor (b. 1905 in the United Kingdom)
- April 30 – Jules White, film director and producer (b. 1900)
- May 9 – Edmond O'Brien, actor and film director (b. 1915)
- May 11 – Chester Gould, cartoonist (b. 1900)
- May 13 – Selma Diamond, Canadian-born American comedian, actress, and writer (b. 1920)
- May 16 – Margaret Hamilton, American actress (b. 1902)
- May 17 – Abe Burrows, humorist, author, and director (b. 1910)
- June 3 – Arch MacDonald, American broadcast journalist and television pioneer (b. 1911)
- June 6 – Leonard Lake, American serial killer (b. 1945)
- June 11 – Vic Tanny, American bodybuilder and physical culture advocate (b. 1912)
- June 21 – Ettore Boiardi (Hector Boyardee), Italian-American chef, founder of Chef Boyardee (b. 1897)
- June 25 – Pee Wee Crayton, guitarist and singer (b. 1914)
- July 8 – Phil Foster, actor and performer (b. 1913)
- July 23 – Kay Kyser, bandleader and radio personality (b. 1905)
- July 27 – Smoky Joe Wood, baseball player (b. 1889)
- July 28 – Grant Williams, actor (b. 1931)
- August 6 – John Harmon, actor (b. 1905)
- August 8 – Louise Brooks, actress and dancer (b. 1906)
- August 13 – J. Willard Marriot, entrepreneur and businessman (b. 1900)
- August 20 – Ruth Gordon, actress and writer (b. 1896)
- August 25 – Samantha Smith, activist and child actress (b. 1972)
- September 2 – Jay Youngblood, wrestler (b. 1955)
- September 11 – Andrew C. Thornton II, narcotics officer, lawyer, and the head member of a drug smuggling ring in Kentucky (b. 1944)
- September 14 – Julian Beck, actor, director, poet, and painter (b. 1925)
- September 27 – Lloyd Nolan, actor (b. 1902)
- October 1 – E. B. White, writer (b. 1899)
- October 2 – Rock Hudson, actor (b. 1925)
- October 3 – Charles Collingwood, journalist and war correspondent (b. 1917)
- October 6 – Nelson Riddle, arranger, composer, bandleader, and orchestrator (b. 1921)
- October 8 – John Wesley Snyder, businessman and Secretary of the Treasury (b. 1895)
- October 10
  - Yul Brynner, Russian-born American actor (b. 1920)
  - Orson Welles, actor and director (b. 1915)
- October 12
  - Johnny Olson, radio personality and television announcer (b. 1910)
  - Ricky Wilson, musician and guitarist (b. 1953)
- October 15 – Ted Steele, bandleader and host (b. 1917)
- October 25 – Blair Lee III, politician, Lieutenant Governor of Maryland (b. 1916)
- October 27 – Thomas Townsend Brown, inventor (born 1905)
- November 1
  - Rick McGraw, wrestler (b. 1955)
  - Phil Silvers, entertainer (b. 1911)
- November 4 – Cus D'Amato, boxing trainer (b. 1908)
- November 13
  - William Pereira, architect (b. 1909)
  - George Robert Vincent, sound recording pioneer (b. 1898)
- November 16
  - Stuart Chase, economist (b. 1888)
  - John Sparkman, United States Senator from Alabama from 1946 till 1979. (b. 1899)
- November 19 – Stepin Fetchit, actor and comedian (b. 1902)
- November 25 – Ray Jablonski, American baseball player (b. 1926)
- December 7 – Potter Stewart, lawyer and U.S. Supreme Court associate judge (b. 1915)
- December 12 – Anne Baxter, actress (b. 1923)
- December 14 – Roger Maris, baseball player (b. 1934)
- December 22 – Richard P. Condie, conductor of the Mormon Tabernacle Choir (b. 1898)
- December 23 – Margie Hines, voice actress (b. 1909)
- December 26 – Dian Fossey, primatologist and conservationist (b. 1932)
- December 31 – Ricky Nelson, musician and actor (b. 1940)

== See also ==
- 1985 in American television
- List of American films of 1985
- Timeline of United States history (1970–1989)
