= Problem Child (film) =

1990 film by Dennis Dugan

- Theatrical release poster
- Directed by: Dennis Dugan
- Written by: Scott Alexander; Larry Karaszewski
- Produced by: Robert Simonds
- Starring: John Ritter; Michael Richards; Gilbert Gottfried; Jack Warden
- Cinematography: Peter Lyons Collister
- Edited by: Tom Finan; Daniel P. Hanley; Mike Hill
- Music by: Miles Goodman
- Production company: Imagine Entertainment
- Distributed by: Universal Pictures
- Release date: July 27, 1990
- Running time: 81 minutes
- Country: United States
- Language: English
- Budget: $11 million
- Box office: $72.2 million

Problem Child is a 1990 American black comedy film directed by Dennis Dugan in his feature film directorial debut and produced by Robert Simonds. The film stars John Ritter, Michael Oliver, Jack Warden, Gilbert Gottfried, Amy Yasbeck and Michael Richards. The film revolves around a man named Ben Healy (Ritter), who, after learning his wife Flo is infertile, decides to adopt a boy named Junior (Oliver). Unbeknownst to him, Junior is a disruptive and unruly child, who knows nothing but chaos.

The film received negative reviews from critics, but it was nevertheless a box office success, grossing $72.2 million worldwide against a production budget of $11 million. Problem Child was followed by two sequels, Problem Child 2 (1991) and the made for TV Problem Child 3: Junior in Love (1995) as well as an animated series.

== Plot ==
Ben Healy Jr. is a pleasant man working for his father, "Big Ben" Healy Sr., a tyrannical sporting goods dealer running for mayor. Big Ben intends to sell his entire estate to a Japanese conglomerate, as he holds contempt for Ben's considerate personality and considers Ben "too nice" to be his heir. Ben would love to have a son of his own but his obnoxious social climbing wife, Flo, has been unable to conceive. She cares more about the image of being a wife and mother than the responsibilities.

Ben approaches less-than-scrupulous adoption agent Igor Peabody with his dilemma. Peabody presents him and Flo with a 7-year-old boy named Junior, who Igor wants out of the orphanage. Junior is hardly a model child; mean-spirited and incorrigible, he leaves a path of severe destruction in his wake and is pen pals with Martin Beck, a serial killer known as "the Bow Tie Killer", who mistakes Junior's signature, "J.R." for that of an adult and fellow criminal.

Big Ben falls down the stairs and Junior's room catches on fire. Junior messes up a camping trip with brash and arrogant neighbor Roy and his family by urinating on the campfire and manipulating a practical joke played on the kids by Roy. Junior then is taken to his neighbor Lucy Henderson's birthday party, only for her to ban him from seeing the booked magic act. Ben tries to lift Junior's spirits by giving him his good-luck charm - a hardened prune - but Junior instead sabotages the party. Finally, Junior displays his method for winning in a Little League baseball game, which involves hitting rival players in the crotch with his bat.

Ben has severe doubts about Junior and takes him back to the orphanage. Upon hearing that Junior was returned thirty times by previous adoptive families, Ben decides to keep and love him, something no one has ever done. Distraught, Junior retaliates by driving Ben's car into Big Ben's store. Big Ben cleans out Ben's bank account to pay for the damage. Ben is on the verge of cracking until Beck arrives at the house and kidnaps Junior and Flo.

While Ben initially sees this as good riddance to browbeating Flo and trouble-making Junior, he soon notices signs that Junior is not the monster he appeared to be; through a series of pictures he drew, he depicts children and adults who treated him poorly as deformed monsters with hostile surroundings, but depicts Ben as a person in a pleasant background, revealing that he valued him as a father figure.

Realizing that Junior's behavior was simply a reaction to how he was treated, Ben undertakes a rescue mission to get him back from Beck. Ben first steals Roy's car and hat and confronts Big Ben for money. When he is rudely dismissed, Ben pushes a button that unknowingly puts Big Ben on camera before announcing his election campaign, where he reveals his true nature on the news, mooning the camera.

Ben catches up with Beck and Junior at the circus. Junior gets rescued after escaping from Beck through a trapeze act. Beck drives away but the Healys are on his tail. After a collision, Flo, who was stuffed in a suitcase, flies over the bridge and ends up in the back of a truck loaded with pigs. Beck is arrested but not before getting a shot off, which hits Ben in the chest. Thinking he has died, Junior apologizes and tells him that he loves him.

Ben wakes up and realizes that the bullet ricocheted off the good luck prune he had in his shirt pocket. Junior then removes his bow tie and throws it over the bridge as a symbol of rejecting his relationship with Beck and walks away with Ben. The movie ends with Flo in the back of a truck full of pigs.

== Cast ==
- John Ritter as Benjamin "Ben" Healy Jr.
- Michael Oliver as Junior Healy
- Jack Warden as Benjamin "Big Ben" Healy Sr.
- Gilbert Gottfried as Igor Peabody
- Amy Yasbeck as Florence "Flo" Healy
- Michael Richards as Martin Beck
- Peter Jurasik as Roy

== Production ==
The film was shot on location in Texas from October 2 to November 24, 1989. The primary locations were Dallas, Farmers Branch, Fort Worth, Irving, and Mesquite. Also, there were two weeks of reshoots in Dallas in March 1990. The production budget was originally projected to be $11 million.

Dan Aykroyd, Chevy Chase, Richard Dreyfuss, Steve Martin, Rick Moranis and Kurt Russell were considered for the role of Ben Healy before it was turned over to John Ritter. The part of Martin Beck was originally offered to Christopher Lloyd, who turned it down because of his commitments with Back to the Future Part III, released two months before this one, and was replaced by Michael Richards; this was the second role, following UHF (1989), that Lloyd had turned down only to be taken by Richards. Then-unknown child actor Macaulay Culkin reportedly auditioned for Junior, but Michael Oliver was ultimately cast.

In a 2014 interview on Gilbert Gottfried's Amazing Colossal Podcast, screenwriters Scott Alexander and Larry Karaszewski revealed that the story was inspired by the 1988 Los Angeles Times article "An Adopted Boy--and Terror Begins" about Tom and Janice Colella, a married couple suing Orange County Social Services Agency after they were not informed that their adopted son Tommy had severe mental health issues with violent tendencies and had been previously returned to the agency multiple times.

While other writers pitched the story as a horror film in the vein of Bad Seed or The Omen, Alexander and Karaszewski thought it had potential as a comedy, envisioning a dark, adult satire of the then-popular trend in films where cute kids teach cynical adults how to love, as seen in Baby Boom, Parenthood (directly spoofed by the film's poster), Look Who's Talking, Uncle Buck, Mr. Mom, Kindergarten Cop and Three Men and a Baby, but Universal Pictures insisted upon turning it into a children's film, a conversion that necessitated numerous reshoots and rewrites, leading to a difficult production that left all involved disappointed and anticipating a box office failure.

The film defied expectations, becoming a surprise hit and Universal's most profitable film of 1990, but was still so embarrassing for Alexander and Karaszewski (Alexander even cried after the cast and crew screening) that they tried to distance themselves from it, which proved difficult. Studios were initially reluctant to hire them or take them seriously based on their work on such a prominent disreputable film but, as the years went by, they would eventually come to work with executives who were children when it first came out, and grew up watching its frequent TV airings, and were excited to be meeting its writers. Looking back, they still feel it's "a mess" but take some pride in being involved with one of the "very few [PG-rated] children's films that black and that crazy", citing the scene where Flo Healy (Amy Yasbeck) commits adultery with Martin while Ben is catatonic and contemplating murdering Junior in the next room as an example. They added, "And it's funny".

In 2015, Dennis Dugan revealed that he was hired to direct the film, his first feature one (he'd previously directed episodes of the TV series Moonlighting, Wiseguy, and Hunter), after jumping on a coffee table in a meeting with Universal executives: "You're looking at me like I'm fucking nuts, and this is what we want. We want this kind of chaos". Dugan suggested John Ritter, with whom he'd worked as an actor before turning to direct, for the role of Ben. The studio was initially reluctant, feeling they needed a more famous actor, but eventually relented.

Jack Warden turned down the role of Big Ben Healy before Dugan offered him half of his net points. He was so touched that he took the part, although he refused Dugan's offer. Amy Yasbeck was cast as Flo. She and Ritter fell in love during production, marrying in 1999. Ritter died in 2003. Both he and Gilbert Gottfried were allowed to ad lib while filming, but Universal reprimanded Dugan for shooting too much footage of the latter.

The film's first test screening was disastrous, with 70 percent of the audience walking out, verbal complaints from viewers, and a score of only 30. The studio forced two weeks of reshoots, including a retooled ending and the addition of key scenes, such as Lucy Henderson (Colby Kline)'s birthday party.

== Music ==
A soundtrack was released by Universal the same day as the film, and included an original composition by The Beach Boys.

Track listing
No.	Title	Artist(s)	Length
1.	"Bad to the Bone"	George Thorogood	4:57
2.	"Real Wild Child"	Iggy Pop	3:39
3.	"It's My Party"	Lesley Gore	2:20
4.	"Born to Be Wild"	Steppenwolf	3:33
5.	"Problem Child"	The Beach Boys	4:38

== Reception ==
=== Box office ===
The film was released on July 27, 1990, and debuted in third place, behind Presumed Innocent and Ghost. It was a commercial success at the box office, grossing $53 million domestically and $72 million worldwide.

=== Critical response ===
The film received negative reviews upon its release. On Rotten Tomatoes, it has a rating of 3% based on 31 reviews, and an average rating of 2.8/10. The site's critical consensus reads: "Mean-spirited and hopelessly short on comic invention, Problem Child is a particularly unpleasant comedy, one that's loaded with manic scenery chewing and juvenile pranks". On Metacritic, it has a score of 27 out of 100 based on reviews from 12 critics, indicating "generally unfavorable reviews". Audiences surveyed by CinemaScore gave it a grade "A−" on scale of A to F.

The film was heavily censored when shown on television due to the remarks characters made about adoption, which critics saw as insensitive. It was not screened for critics prior to its release.

Hal Hinson, writing for The Washington Post:

Dugan has a brisk, imaginative comic style; he sets up his gags well so that there are still some surprises in the punch lines when they come. Essentially, the problem here is the same as the problem in Gremlins 2. It's basically about tearing stuff up, and after a while, you grow tired of seeing variations on the same joke of a cute kid committing horrible atrocities.

=== Protests over posters ===
One of the posters for the film showed the cat Fuzzball in a tumble dryer, with the implication being that Junior had put him inside. A group named In Defense of Animals organized protests against the posters, and some cinemas took them down in response. Director Dennis Dugan later issued a disclaimer saying that the "kitty in the dryer" was metaphorical and never an actual scene in the film. The protests sparked the inspiration for the sequel, this time with a poster of John Ritter inside a dryer looking out, while Fuzzball stands by it.

=== Accolades ===
For the film (as well as The Adventures of Ford Fairlane and Look Who's Talking Too), Gilbert Gottfried was nominated for a Golden Raspberry Award for Worst Supporting Actor, but lost to Donald Trump in Ghosts Can't Do It at the 11th Golden Raspberry Awards.

== Home media ==
The film was more successful on home video. The VHS version adds an extra bit just before the closing credits, in which Junior interrupts the sequence to tell the audience that he'll be back next summer for Problem Child 2. Then he disappears and a loud crash noise is heard, followed by Ben shouting, "Junior!", him laughing, and the roll of the closing credits. The VHS version was released in January 1991.

The first DVD release was released by GoodTimes Entertainment in May 2001. It and Problem Child 2 were released together on DVD in the US in March 2004, as a package entitled Problem Child Tantrum Pack. They were presented in open-matte full screen only. No home video release thus far features the deleted footage shown on TV airings of it. The film was re-released on the Family Comedy Pack Quadruple Feature DVD, with other comedy films like Kindergarten Cop, Kicking & Screaming and Major Payne, in anamorphic widescreen, being its first widescreen Region 1 DVD release, in August 2008. It was released on Blu-ray in August 2017.

=== TV version ===
The film first aired on NBC on September 15, 1991, with 12 minutes of previously deleted scenes. All the profanity was dubbed with different and appropriate words and phrases.

== Legacy ==
=== Sequels ===
The film inspired two sequels: the first, Problem Child 2, was released theatrically in 1991; the second, Problem Child 3: Junior in Love, was a television film aired on NBC in 1995. The first one brought back the original cast in their original roles and picked up where the first film ended. Amy Yasbeck was given a new role with a new dynamic opposite to her original character.

In the third and final film, William Katt and Justin Chapman replaced John Ritter and Michael Oliver as Ben and Junior respectively. Gilbert Gottfried and Jack Warden reprised their roles as Igor Peabody and Big Ben. The film does not follow the storyline of the first two films.

=== Television series ===
The film was adapted into an animated television series that aired on USA Network for two seasons, from October 31, 1993, to December 4, 1994. Gilbert Gottfried was the only original cast member to be featured as a voice-over actor, making him the only cast member involved in all three films and the animated series.

In 2015, NBC ordered a pilot for a live-action TV series based on the film, produced by STXtelevision, Imagine TV, and NBCUniversal, but the pilot was not picked up by the network.

=== In popular culture ===
The film was featured in a famous scene from Martin Scorsese's 1991 remake of Cape Fear, where it is shown screening at a movie theatre attended by ex-convict Max Cady (Robert De Niro), attorney Sam Bowden (Nick Nolte) and the latter's family. Cady, trying to unsettle Bowden and his family, loudly and obnoxiously cackles at the film.

=== Adaptations ===
In 1995, a Turkish-language adaptation of the film was made called Zıpçıktı, which was directed by Ünal Küpeli and featured Şenol Coşkun in the lead role.
