= Poochinski =

- Written by: David Kirschner; Brian Levant; Lon Diamond
- Directed by: Will Mackenzie
- Starring: George Newbern; Amy Yasbeck; Peter Boyle
- Theme music composer: Andy Summers
- Country of origin: United States
- Original language: English
- No. of episodes: 1

Production
- Executive producers: David Kirschner; Brian Levant; Robert M. Myman; John Ritter
- Producer: David Kirschner
- Production companies: Adam Productions; Bedrock Productions; 20th Century Fox Television

Original release
- Network: NBC
- Release: July 9, 1990

Poochinski is a 1990 unsold television pilot.

== Background ==
The story follows Chicago police detective Stanley Poochinski (played by Peter Boyle), whose spirit is transferred into a flatulent English bulldog after he is killed in the line of duty. The canine detective then returns to solving crimes.

NBC decided not to pick up the series, but subsequently did air the pilot, on July 9, 1990. Years later, the show's premise has been recognized as one of the most bizarre in television history. On July 10, 2018, The Last Podcast on the Left aired the pilot in its entirety on their live stream on the Adult Swim website.

== Cast ==
- George Newbern as Det. Robert McKay
- Amy Yasbeck as Frannie Reynolds
- Frank McRae as Capt. Ed Martin
- Brian Haley as Sgt. Shriver
- Peter Boyle as Stanley Poochinski

== See also ==
- Sight Unseen (TV series)
- List of television shows notable for negative reception
