= Dead Husbands =

1998 Canadian-American film

- Genre: Black comedy
- Based on: The Last Man on the List by Bob Randall
- Written by: Lindsay Harrison
- Directed by: Paul Shapiro
- Starring: Nicollette Sheridan; John Ritter; Sonja Smits; Donna Pescow; Amy Yasbeck; Sheila McCarthy
- Music by: Jonathan Goldsmith
- Countries of origin: Canada; United States
- Original language: English

Production
- Executive producers: Jean Abounader; Alfred Monacella
- Producer: Karen Moore
- Cinematography: Frank Tidy
- Editor: Craig Bench
- Running time: 90 minutes
- Production companies: Power Pictures; USA Pictures; Blue Swan Entertainment (distributor)

Original release
- Network: USA Network
- Release: December 2, 1998

Dead Husbands is a 1998 Canadian-American made-for-television black comedy film starring Nicollette Sheridan, John Ritter, Sonja Smits, Donna Pescow, Amy Yasbeck and Sheila McCarthy. It is based on the novel Last Man on the List by Bob Randall. The film is written by Lindsay Harrison and is directed by Paul Shapiro. It premiered on the USA Network on December 2, 1998.

== Plot ==
Dr. Carter Elson is startled to find a list of men’s names—with his own name at the bottom—among his wife Alexandra's possessions. The names before his happen to be the names of recently deceased men. With his friend Betty, Carter tries to solve the mystery of the list before his name reaches the top.

It is revealed that Alexandra, a small town-girl who married Carter in order to climb the social ladder, has become dissatisfied with her husband as he expresses a desire to move to a small town in New Hampshire. Alexandra has befriended Sheila and Rosemary, a pair of wives who are similarly unhappy with their partners but don’t want to part with the financial benefits offered. Sheila and Rosemary are part of a chain letter in which one can get her husband’s name on the bottom of the list if the man listed at the top is killed. Alexandra joins the chain letter without hesitation but runs into obstacles when she finds her membership usurped by another woman and tries to jump the line.

== Cast ==
- Nicollette Sheridan as Alexandra Elston
- John Ritter as Dr. Carter Elston
- Sonja Smits as Sheila Feinstein
- Donna Pescow as Rosemary Monroe
- Amy Yasbeck as Betty Lancing
- Sheila McCarthy as Jane Armitage
- Sherry Miller as Nicole Allison
- Bill MacDonald as Detective Winitsky
- Kenneth Welsh as Chase Woodward
- Erin Chandler as Nancy Abbott
- Eugene Clark as Sheriff Moss
- David Huband as Warm-Up Guy
- Corinne Conley as Mrs. Catcher
- Michèle Duquet as Mrs. Phillips
- Pixie Bigelow as Mrs. George Harris
- Huey Lewis as art critic (uncredited)

== Reception ==
Paul Freitag-Fey of the Daily Grindhouse wrote the film is "a surprisingly mean-spirited bit of black comedy that sometimes feels like two different tones warring with each other (the affable everyman of Ritter’s Carter and the almost Paul Bartellian wickedness of, well, everyone else) but still manages to be consistently entertaining."
