= Problem Child 2 =

1991 film by Brian Levant

- Theatrical release poster
- Directed by: Brian Levant
- Written by: Scott Alexander; Larry Karaszewski
- Based on: Characters by Scott Alexander and Larry Karaszewski
- Produced by: Robert Simonds
- Starring: John Ritter; Michael Oliver; Laraine Newman; Amy Yasbeck; Jack Warden
- Cinematography: Peter Smokler
- Edited by: Lois Freeman-Fox; Robert P. Seppey
- Music by: David Kitay
- Production company: Imagine Entertainment
- Distributed by: Universal Pictures
- Release date: July 5, 1991
- Running time: 90 minutes
- Country: United States
- Language: English
- Budget: $11–15 million
- Box office: $32.7 million

Problem Child 2 is a 1991 American black comedy film and a sequel to the 1990 film Problem Child. The film stars John Ritter, Michael Oliver, Laraine Newman, Amy Yasbeck and Jack Warden. Oliver reprises his role as Junior Healy, an adopted orphan boy who deliberately wreaks comedic havoc everywhere he goes. Ritter and Warden also reprise their roles as his adopted father, Ben Healy, and his adopted grandfather, Big Ben Healy, respectively. Yasbeck, who played Ben's wife Flo in the first film, this time appears as school nurse Annie Young with a daughter named Trixie (Ivyann Schwan), who is also a problem child.

It was directed by Brian Levant in his feature film directorial debut and produced by Robert Simonds, who also produced the first film. In addition, Scott Alexander and Larry Karaszewski returned as screenwriters. It was rated PG-13, unlike its predecessor, which was rated PG. While failing to match the success of the first film, Problem Child 2 was still a box office success, doubling its budget in box office receipts. The film was followed by a sequel, Problem Child 3: Junior in Love, in 1995.

== Plot ==
Ben Healy has divorced his controlling and overbearing wife Flo before he and his adoptive son Junior Healy move to Mortville, Oregon, a quiet community, as a way to start over. (Note: As depicted in Problem Child (1990).) Ben is initially sad to leave Cold River until Junior reminds him that everyone there has been horrible to him his whole life. Before they arrive at their new house, Junior sees a girl roller skating on the sidewalk with a balloon. He pops it with his sling shot and laughs at her as he goes by. He and Ben arrive at their new house, and moments later, dozens of women line up in their front yard, all wanting to date Ben. Meanwhile, Ben's father, "Big Ben" Healy, moves in with them when he loses all of his money in a bad investment.

When Junior starts third grade, he sees that Igor Peabody is the principal at his new school. Peabody screams at the sight of him and promptly promotes him to the sixth grade, claiming him a "genius" just to be rid of him next year. He gets on school bully Murph Murphy's bad side when he tapes him to the chalkboard. He retaliates by trying to drop the school's satellite dish on Junior, but it misses him and hits Ben instead, knocking him out. When Ben comes to, he sees the school nurse, Annie Young, and becomes smitten with her. Junior, annoyed at Ben's sudden love interest, retaliates by attempting to draw a mustache on Annie's picture hanging in the hall, only to be foiled by Trixie, the girl whose balloon he popped earlier. They then engage in an escalating prank war.

Around the same time, LaWanda DuMore, the richest lady in Mortville, takes an interest in Ben, much to Junior's chagrin. While Ben and Junior are gone for the day, she decorates their house to impress Ben. Junior ruins a dinner she makes by putting live cockroaches in it. Afterward, she tells him that when she is his stepmother she will send him to boarding school in Baghdad. He tries to tell Ben that she is bad, but Ben does not believe him.

While at a school function, Ben sees the puppet show go awry and thinks Junior is to blame. He stops it but is surprised to see it's Trixie instead, while Junior was in the audience watching the show. It is also revealed that Annie is her mother. As Annie rushes to take her home, Ben tries to tell her he understands what it is like raising a problem child and thinks they can help one another. She tells him she likes him, but if they date, Trixie's behavior would only get worse. He proposes to LaWanda believing she is the only woman who will marry him.

By a chance meeting at a pizza restaurant, Ben, Annie, Junior and Trixie have dinner together and a good time, even after the food fight the kids start with Peabody and his date gets them thrown out. Junior and Trixie apologize to each other and decide that Ben and Annie should date. Junior tries to stop the wedding by switching LaWanda's blood sample with that of an ill dog. As a result, she is handcuffed by health department officers and sent to the hospital for observation. With her there, Junior overhears a patient in the room across from hers saying he wants to hold the world record for the longest nose. He sabotages her plastic surgery by switching the patient files, resulting in her receiving a gigantic nose – his attempt to make her so ugly that Ben will not marry her. However, she uses her funds to get last minute surgery to undo the damage. At the altar, Junior's and Trixie's work pays off, and Ben finally realizes that Annie is the one for him, and Junior was telling the truth about LaWanda after she openly stated that she hates children, much to his shock. Big Ben decides to marry her for her money, while Junior and Trixie use explosives to splatter them with the wedding cake.

== Cast ==
- John Ritter as Benjamin "Ben" Healy Jr.
- Michael Oliver as Junior Healy
- Laraine Newman as LaWanda Dumore
- Amy Yasbeck as Annie Young
- Gilbert Gottfried as Igor Peabody
- Ivyann Schwan as Trixie Young
- Jack Warden as Benjamin "Big Ben" Healy Sr.
- James Tolkan as Mr. Thorn
- Charlene Tilton as Debbie Claukinski
- Paul Willson as Smith
- Alan Blumenfeld as Aron Burger
- Buffalo Bob Smith as Father Flanagan
- Martha Quinn as Emily
- Zach Grenier as Voytek Claukinski
- Eric Edwards as "Murph" Murphy
- Krystle Mataras as Dolly
- Tiffany Mataras as Madison
- Kristina Simonds as Rhoda
- Aaron Vaughn as Boyfriend
- Ric Reitz as Health Official
- Brett Rice as Maitre D'
- Elaine Klimaszewski as Hot Tub Girl
- Diane Klimaszewski as Hot Tub Girl
- June Foray as Puppet (voice)

== Production ==
The film was shot on location in Orlando, Florida from January 16 to March 15, 1991, including the then-newly opened Universal Studios Florida. The Pizzariffic scene was filmed at a small, vacant restaurant on Orlando Avenue in Maitland. The gift shop in the opening montage is on International Drive in Orlando. At another point in the opening montage, Ben (John Ritter) and Junior (Michael Oliver) get donuts from Randy's Donuts in Inglewood, California. The scenes for their house were filmed at 1216 Lancaster Drive in Orlando. When they are leaving Cold River at the beginning, they are driving down Atlanta Avenue in Orlando. All of the Mortville Elementary School scenes were filmed at Orlando's Kaley Elementary School. Napasorn Thai on East Pine Street in Downtown Orlando was used for the Dunmore Bank, as evidenced by the restaurant's unique inlaid corner windows visible in the scene. Orlando's Harry P. Leu Gardens was used as the "Love Rock" backdrop for the wedding scene. The Hyatt Regency Orlando was used as the Saint Pierre Club backdrop for Ben and Debbie Klaukinski (Charlene Tilton)'s date scene.

In 2014, during an interview on Gilbert Gottfried's Amazing Colossal Podcast, screenwriters Scott Alexander and Larry Karaszewski revealed that Universal Pictures was reluctant to rehire them, only doing so because they wanted to shoot a sequel before Michael Oliver could noticeably grow and, as the writers of the first film, could produce a script quicker than writers new to the story and characters.

Frustrated with the criticisms of the first film, Alexander and Karaszewski deliberately increased the poor taste, intending to make a Pier Paolo Pasolini or John Waters film for children, and went so far overboard that the first cut received an R rating from the MPAA, a secret kept until their 2014 appearance on the podcast. Dubbing over Junior's use of the term "pussy-whipped" got a PG-13 on appeal, but the studio was still so nervous that, at the last minute, they added the 1947 Woody Woodpecker cartoon Smoked Hams to its theatrical run, to reassure parents that it was suitable for children.

== Reception ==
The film did not match the success of the first film, earning half as much at the U.S. box-office. Rotten Tomatoes reports that 7% of 27 surveyed critics gave it a positive review, with an average rating of 3.3/10. The site's consensus reads: "Crude, rude, puerile, and pointless, Problem Child 2 represents a cynical nadir in family-marketed entertainment". Audiences surveyed by CinemaScore gave it a grade "B+" on scale of A to F.

Variety gave a negative review, criticizing its "fingerpainted" script and considered the film to be worse than its predecessor.

== Home media ==
The film was released on Blu-ray by Universal Pictures Home Entertainment on May 15, 2018. It was released as part of a double-feature along with the first film on DVD by Mill Creek on June 8, 2021.

== TV version ==
The film first aired on NBC on November 2, 1992, with 7 minutes of previously deleted scenes, an altered scene in Igor Peabody (Gottfried)'s office where Junior burps rather than let out a long fart and profanity dubbed with appropriate phrases.
