= The Fan (Randall novel) =

1977 novel by Bob Randall

- First edition cover art
- Author: Bob Randall
- Language: English
- Genre: Thriller
- Published: 1977, Random House
- Publication place: United States
- Media type: Print (Hardcover)
- Pages: 285
- ISBN: 978-0-436-40250-0
- OCLC: 4311646

The Fan is a 1977 American epistolary thriller novel by Bob Randall. Its plot follows a famous actress who is pursued by a maniac male fan with dangerous impulses. It was published in 1977 by Random House. It was adapted into the 1981 feature film of the same name starring Lauren Bacall and Michael Biehn.

== Style ==
The novel is written in epistolary form, presented as a series of diary entries and letter correspondence between the main characters, Sally Ross, an aging but glamorous actress, and Douglas, an obsessive young fan.
