= Steven McRae =

Australian ballet dancer and tap dancer (born 1985)

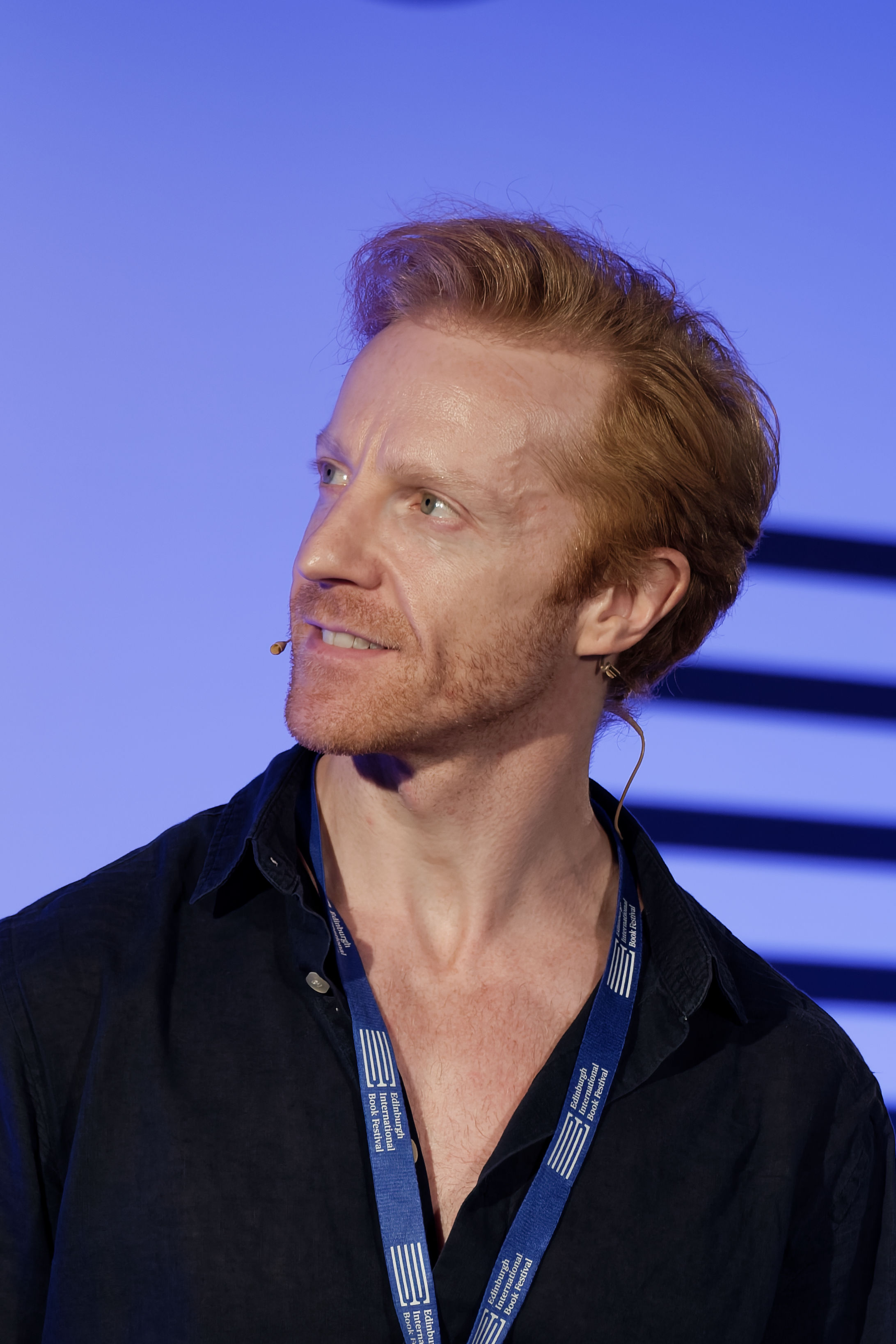
- McRae in 2026
- Born: Plumpton, New South Wales, Australia
- Education: Royal Ballet School
- Occupation: Principal dancer
- Years active: 2004–present
- Spouse: Elizabeth Harrod
- Career
- Current group: The Royal Ballet

Steven McRae is an Australian ballet dancer and tap dancer. He is a principal dancer with the Royal Ballet in London, England.

== Early life and education ==
Steven McRae was raised in the western Sydney suburb of Plumpton, the son of a drag racer. He started dancing at age seven, after watching his older sister in her dance classes. He studied tap as well as ballet.

He was soon being entered for the performing-arts competitions in Australia known as eisteddfods, often gracing 25 sections at a time. In 2002, at age 16, he won the gold medal at the 2002 Genée held in Sydney that year. In 2003, at age 17, he won the Prix de Lausanne in Switzerland, earning a scholarship, and entered the Royal Ballet School in London.

== Career ==
McRae graduated into The Royal Ballet in 2004 and was promoted to first artist in 2005, soloist in 2006, first soloist in 2008 and principal in 2009. The Guardian has called McRae "a modern-day Fred Astaire".

In 2014, he was named "Young Australian Achiever of the Year in the UK" for his work with the Royal Ballet.

He works still with Lesley Collier, a principal dancer with the Royal Ballet from 1972 to 1995 and répétiteur since 2000, as his coach at the Royal Ballet. McRae's most marked characteristics have been noted as his speed and his red hair.

=== First principal role ===
In 2005, in his first season with the Royal Ballet, McRae danced Symphonic Variations by Frederick Ashton. Symphonic Variations was Ashton's first work after World War II and one of the Company's first to be performed on the main stage of the Royal Opera House.

=== Original roles ===
In 2011, McRae originated the role of the Mad Hatter in Christopher Wheeldon's Alice's Adventures in Wonderland at the Royal Opera House. In 2014, he originated the role of Prince Florizel in Christopher Wheeldon's new full-length ballet The Winter's Tale.

In 2016, McRae originated the role of "The Creature" in Liam Scarlett's full-length ballet of Mary Shelley's Frankenstein.

"There is a moment before Steven McRae steps on stage that you easily can mistake for nerves and he has learnt over the years that it's not nerves, it's adrenaline and a slight sense of anxiety. It's almost impossible to dance as a soloist without this performance element."

He is frequently used in works from Royal Ballet choreographer Wayne McGregor such as Chroma, Multiverse, and Limen, as he is very quick in picking up on McGregor's modern style as well as the way he can manipulate his body.

=== Injuries ===
In January 2008, at 22, McRae partially tore his Achilles tendon and was told that not only would he never dance again but he would have an enduring limp. He found "a most incredible" Swedish surgeon and it took a year, until December 2008, to recover. He started rehabilitation classes with his coach, Lesley Collier, and psychological rehabilitation, and studied for a BA Hons in business management and leadership. McRae completed his university degree while working full time.

During a live performance in October 2019, McRae again tore his Achiles tendon; he returned to performing in October 2021.

=== Film work ===
McRae plays Skimbleshanks the railway cat in the 2019 film adaptation of Cats. His Achilles tendon injury was discussed in the BBC programme Men at the Barre.

The film Dancing Back to the Light summarises his professional and personal life, including excerpts from several of his significant performances. (Broadcast on BBC Two 14 March 2025, and on BBC iPlayer).

== Personal life ==
McRae is married to Elizabeth Harrod, soloist with the Royal Ballet, and they have children.

== Repertory ==
- The Tales of Beatrix Potter : Squirrel Nutkin
- Alice's Adventures in Wonderland : Magician/Mad Hatter
- Sweet Violets : Jack
- Hansel and Gretel : Sandman
- Frankenstein : Creature
- Swan Lake : Siegfried
- Giselle : Albrecht
- Romeo and Juliet : Romeo
- Manon : Des Grieux
- The Sleeping Beauty : Prince Florimund
- Mayerling : Crown Prince Rudolf
- The Nutcracker : Sugar Plum Fairy's Cavalier

== Awards ==
- 2002 : Genée International Ballet Competition, Gold Medal
- 2003 : Prix de Lausanne
- 2007 : Emerging Male Artist (Classical)
- 2012 : Best Male Dancer Awards at the Critics' Circle Dance Awards
- 2014 : Young Australian Achiever in the UK by the Australia Day Foundation
