= 6 Rms Riv Vu =

Original poster.

6 Rms Riv Vu is a play by Bob Randall.

== Play ==
6 Rms Riv Vu derives its title from shorthand used by real estate agents in classified advertising. In this case, a six-room apartment with a view of the Hudson River, located on Manhattan's Riverside Drive, serves as the comedy-drama's setting. Paul Friedman is a married advertising copywriter, Anne Miller is a discontented housewife, and the two meet when they respond to a listing in The New York Times for the available unit. They discover the door has been locked accidentally, trapping them inside, and a connection slowly develops as they begin to share the details of their respective lives.

After nine previews, the Alexander H. Cohen production, directed by Edwin Sherin, had its Broadway premiere on October 17, 1972, at the Helen Hayes Theatre, where it ran for three months before transferring to the Lunt Fontanne for the remainder of its run, a total of 247 performances. The opening night cast included Jane Alexander, Jerry Orbach, Ron Harper, F. Murray Abraham, and Jennifer Warren.

== Television film ==
6 Rms Riv Vu
- Written by: Bob Randall
- Directed by: Alan Alda; Clark Jones
- Starring: Carol Burnett; Alan Alda; Lawrence Pressman
- Music by: Peter Matz
- Country of origin: United States
- Original language: English

Production
- Producer: Joe Hamilton
- Running time: 110 minutes

Original release
- Network: CBS
- Release: March 17, 1974

In 1974, Carol Burnett and Alan Alda starred in a televised version that garnered both of them Emmy Award nominations. This version was directed by Alan Alda and Clark Jones.

== Awards and honors ==
- Tony Award for Best Actress in a Play (Alexander, nominee)
- Theatre World Award (Warren, winner)
- Drama Desk Award for Most Promising New Playwright (winner)
