= Skimbleshanks =

Fictional character

- Cats character
- Skimbleshanks, played by Reed Jones in the original Broadway cast of Cats.
- First appearance: Cats (1981)
- Created by: Andrew Lloyd Webber
- Based on: Old Possum's Book of Practical Cats by T. S. Eliot

Skimbleshanks is a character in T. S. Eliot's 1939 book of poetry Old Possum's Book of Practical Cats and in Andrew Lloyd Webber's 1981 musical Cats, which is based on Eliot's book. The character is portrayed as a bright and energetic orange tabby cat who lives and works on the mail trains.

The role of Skimbleshanks was originated in the West End by Kenn Wells in 1981, and on Broadway by Reed Jones in 1982. He was portrayed by Geoffery Garrat and voiced by David Arneil in the 1998 film adaptation, and Steven McRae in the 2019 film adaptation.

== Origins ==
The T. S Eliot poem begins as a parody of Rudyard Kipling's poem "l'Envoi" (also known as "The Long Trail") from Barrack-Room Ballads and Other Verses. Compare the first few lines of Kipling's

There's a whisper down the field where the year has shot her yield,
And the ricks stand grey to the sun,
Singing:--'Over then, come over, for the bee has quit the clover,
And your English summer's done.'

You have heard the beat of the off-shore wind,
And the thresh of the deep-sea rain;
You have heard the song--how long! how long?
Pull out on the trail again!

with Eliot's

There's a whisper down the line at 11.39
When the Night Mail's ready to depart,
Saying `Skimble where is Skimble has he gone to hunt the thimble?
We must find him or the train can't start.'
All the guards and all the porters and the stationmaster's daughters
They are searching high and low,
Saying `Skimble where is Skimble for unless he's very nimble
Then the Night Mail just can't go.'

Skimbleshanks is described as living on the Night Mail overnight express train that travels on the British West Coast Main Line (WCML) between London Euston and Glasgow Central. He is however not exclusively based on the WCML, as he has visited Dumfries on the Glasgow South Western Line, then terminating at Glasgow St Enoch; but he spends most of his time on the WCML, allowing him to visit stations such as Crewe, Carlisle, and Gallowgate, all of which are on this line.

Although originally published as part of a collection of poems, Skimbleshanks: The Railway Cat was published as a standalone picture book by Faber and Faber in 2015.

== Character ==
In the musical Cats, Skimbleshanks is depicted as a bright and energetic older cat who lives and works on the mail trains. He is a meticulous control freak, though he has a tender side that comes out in his interactions with Jennyanydots and the kittens. He is a figure of great importance in the train's operation; it will not leave without him, and he frequently looks in on the passengers and crew to ensure that everything is running smoothly.

The role of Skimbleshanks is meant to be played by a high baritone or tenor who is trained in classical dance.

=== Appearance ===
Skimbleshanks is an orange tabby cat; he has a stiff collar and wears a brown waistcoat with a pocket watch chain.

== Notable casting ==
The role of Skimbleshanks was originated in the West End by Kenn Wells in 1981, and on Broadway by Reed Jones in 1982. In the 2016 Broadway revival, he was played by Jeremy Davis. On screen, the character was played by Geoffrey Garratt in the 1998 video version of the musical, and by Steven McRae in the 2019 film adaptation.

== In popular culture ==
Beginning in March 2019, the Rinkai Line in Tokyo, Japan, uses a jingle of "Skimbleshanks: The Railway Cat" as its train departure melody at the Ōimachi Station for the train to the Shin-Kiba Station.

In the 2025 film Wake Up Dead Man, Benoit Blanc (Daniel Craig) is caught listening to the song in his car.
