= On Our Own (1977 TV series) =

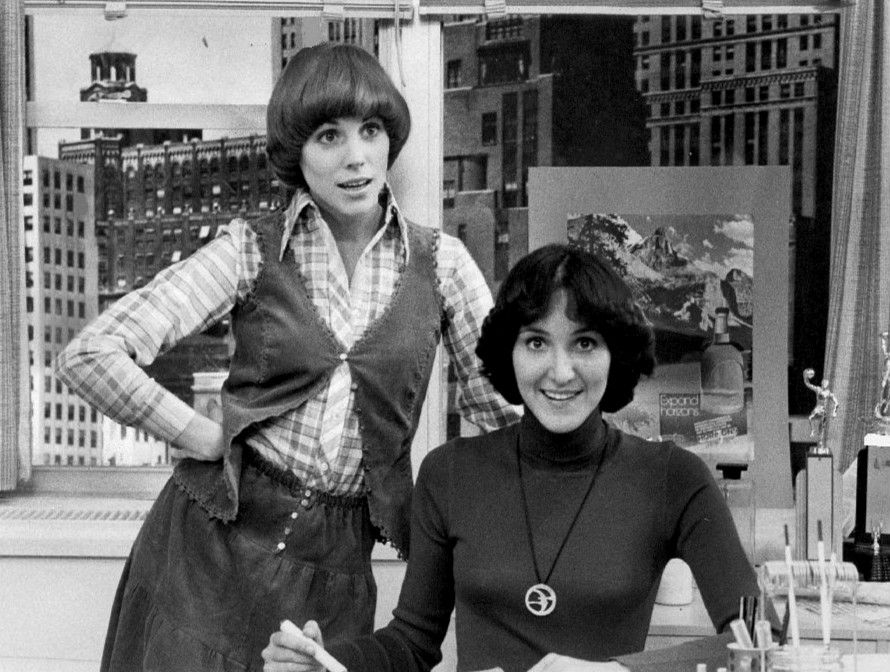
- Bess Armstrong (standing) and Lynnie Greene.
- Genre: Sitcom
- Created by: Bob Randall
- Starring: Lynnie Greene; Bess Armstrong; Gretchen Wyler; Dixie Carter; Terence Knox; Dan Resin; John Christopher Jones; Bob Randall
- Theme music composer: Score Productions
- Country of origin: United States
- Original language: English
- No. of seasons: 1
- No. of episodes: 22

Production
- Executive producer: David Susskind
- Running time: 30 minutes
- Production company: Time-Life Television

Original release
- Network: CBS
- Release: October 9, 1977 – April 30, 1978

On Our Own is an American sitcom broadcast Sundays at 8:30 pm (EST) on CBS as part of the network's 1977–78 schedule. The show featured Lynnie Greene as Maria Bonino and Bess Armstrong as Julia Peters, two employees of the Bedford Advertising Agency in New York City. Toni McBain (Gretchen Wyler) was their boss, while April Baxter (Dixie Carter) and Phil Goldstein were their coworkers.

The show aired from October 9, 1977, until April 30, 1978. The show ranked #29 for the 1977-1978 season; it was the highest-rated new series of that season to be cancelled.

WWL, the CBS affiliate in New Orleans, stopped airing the show after 11 episodes.

== Cast ==
- Lynnie Greene as Maria Teresa Bonino
- Bess Armstrong as Julia Peters
- Gretchen Wyler as Toni McBain
- Dixie Carter as April Baxter
- Dan Resin as Craig Boatwright
- John Christopher Jones as Eddie Barnes
- Bob Randall as J.M. Bedford

== Production ==
On Our Own was shot at CBS studios in New York City and edited at Unitel. The editor was Frank Herold. The show was videotaped in front of a live audience, which was unusual for a sitcom, as most sitcoms were taped in the Los Angeles area.

== Episodes ==
| No. | Title | Directed by | Written by | Original release date |
|---|---|---|---|---|
| 1 | "Never Trust an Actor With His Clothes Off" | Unknown | Bob Randall | October 9, 1977 |
| 2 | "Wood is Not Good" | Doug Rogers | Bruce Kane | October 16, 1977 |
| 3 | "Goodbye Jim, Hello Father" | Doug Rogers | Andrew Smith | October 23, 1977 |
| 4 | "The Battling Boninos" | Noam Pitlik | Nicolas DeMarco | October 30, 1977 |
| 5 | "Julia in the Dark" | Mel Shapiro | Andrew Smith | November 6, 1977 |
| 6 | "Julia's Big Bust" | Lee Bernhardi | Jim Rogers | November 13, 1977 |
| 7 | "Honesty is Not the Best Policy" | Chuck Liotta | Tony DiMarco and David Ketchum | November 27, 1977 |
| 8 | "The Odd Couplet" | Lee Bernhardi | Andrew Smith | December 4, 1977 |
| 9 | "She Makes More Than Me" | James Burrows | Bob Randall | December 11, 1977 |
| 10 | "The Blind Date" | Unknown | Andrew Smith | January 8, 1978 |
| 11 | "The Bare Truth" | Chuck Liotta | Arnold Kane | January 22, 1978 |
| 12 | "Some Like It Glazed" | Lee Bernhardi | David Lerner and Howard Gewirtz | January 29, 1978 |
| 13 | "The Naked Summer" | Noam Pitlik | Jennie Blackton and Joan Desberg Greenberg | February 5, 1978 |
| 14 | "A Friend, Indeed" | Lee Bernhardi | Tony Lang | February 19, 1978 |
| 15 | "Arrivederci Toni" | James Burrows | Bob Randall | February 26, 1978 |
| 16 | "The Impossible Dream" | Lee Bernhardi | Stephen Fischer and Arlene Sanford | March 5, 1978 |
| 17 | "When a Body Meets a Body" | Chuck Liotta | Nicholas DeMarco | March 12, 1978 |
| 18 | "Add Two Children and Stir: Part 1" | Lee Bernhardi | Joseph A. Goodson | April 2, 1978 |
| 19 | "Add Two Children and Stir: Part 2" | Lee Bernhardi | Joseph A. Goodson | April 9, 1978 |
| 20 | "That's Entertainment III" | Unknown | Jim Rogers and Jennie Blackton and Joan Desberg Greenberg | April 16, 1978 |
| 21 | "A Rose is a Rose..." | Chuck Liotta | Jane Richmond | April 23, 1978 |
| 22 | "Meet Mr. Meat" | Ira Cirker | David Garber and Kevin Hartigan | April 30, 1978 |
