= Dillinger and Capone =

- Theatrical release poster
- Directed by: Jon Purdy
- Written by: Michael B. Druxman
- Produced by: Roger Corman; Mike Elliott
- Starring: Martin Sheen; F. Murray Abraham; Michael Oliver; Catherine Hicks; Stephen Davies; Don Stroud
- Cinematography: John B. Aronson
- Edited by: Norman Buckley
- Music by: Steve Cohn
- Production companies: New Horizons; Hillwood Entertainment Production
- Release date: June 20, 1995
- Running time: 95 minutes
- Country: United States
- Language: English

Dillinger and Capone is a 1995 American action film directed by Jon Purdy and starring Martin Sheen, F. Murray Abraham, Michael Oliver, Catherine Hicks, and Don Stroud. The film was screened at MystFest in Cattolica, Italy and the Cannes Film Festival in 1995. Written by Michael B. Druxman, the film is not based in real events but imagines a world in which John Dillinger is not killed at the Biograph Theater and lives on to work with Al Capone. The film was acquired by Cinemax and aired on their cable television network periodically in 1996. In 1997 the film was acquired by HBO and aired periodically on that television network.

== Plot ==
On July 22, 1934, Roy Dillinger (identical twin brother of infamous bank robber John Dillinger) is warned by John's friend George that his brother has been set up by the FBI, who plan to arrest him while he is out on a date with Anna Sage at the Biograph Theater. Rushing to warn John, Roy is mistaken for his brother by an FBI agent who guns him down. John slips out during the commotion and realizes that his brother is dead.

Having grown weary of his criminal lifestyle, John returns home and decides to bury his past. He moves to the countryside, marries Abigail Dalton, and takes her surname as his own. They have a son, and John quietly takes up work as a farmer.

Several years later, in 1940, disgraced Chicago Outfit boss Al Capone is released from prison on medical grounds after being diagnosed with terminal neurosyphilis. His family moves him to a mansion in Florida, but Capone retains enough of his mind to realize that he is now effectively bankrupt, under heavy police surveillance, and abandoned by his former organization. Learning that the famous John Dillinger is still alive, Capone blackmails him to carry out one final heist: a vault, hidden by Capone in Chicago during his criminal reign, that contains millions in untraceable diamonds.

== Cast ==
- Martin Sheen as John Dillinger
- F. Murray Abraham as Al Capone
- Michael Oliver as Sam Dalton
- Catherine Hicks as Abigail
- Don Stroud as George
- Stephen Davies as Cecil
- Michael C. Gwynne as Perkins
- Jeffrey Combs as Gilroy
- Anthony Crivello as Lou Gazzo
- Clint Howard as Bobo
- Time Winters as Eli
- Jeffrey Dean Morgan as Jack Bennett

== Critical reception ==
An Entertainment Weekly review in 1995 gave the film a "C minus" rating and described it as "far-fetched fiction". Critic Leonard Maltin awarded the film two stars, and stated that the film is "boosted by slick acting, but it soon slides into a routine heist thriller."
