= Reed Jones =

American dancer (1953–1989)

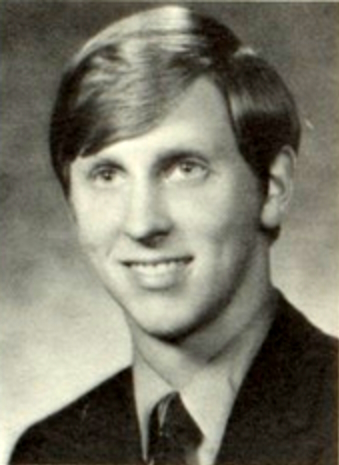
- Born: June 30, 1953; Portland, Oregon
- Died: June 19, 1989 (aged 35); Sherman Oaks, California
- Occupations: Dancer, choreographer

Reed Jones (June 30, 1953 – June 19, 1989) was a dancer and choreographer whose credits included Skimbleshanks in the original cast of Cats and Big Deal in the Jerome Robbins revival of West Side Story.

== Early life ==
Jones was born in Portland, Oregon.

== Performances ==
Originally cast as an understudy, Jones originated the role of Skimbleshanks, the Railway Cat in the original Broadway company of Cats. He replaced originally cast member Willie Rosario in the pre-opening rehearsal period, after Rosario suffered a prolonged knee injury. Other Broadway credits included Peter Pan (1979 revival, dance captain), West Side Story (1980 revival), America (1981), Play Me a Country Song (1982, dance captain), A Chorus Line (1983), You Can't Take it With You (1983, choreographer), As Is (1985), The Loves of Anatol (1985). He also toured as a dancer with Sandy Duncan in 1979.

On screen, Jones appeared in an episode of Live from Lincoln Center (1979) and as a dancer in the film adaptation of A Chorus Line (1985). He was also credited as a choreographer in The Fan (1981), starring Lauren Bacall, and for musical staging when You Can't Take it WIth You was shown on Great Performances in 1984.

== Death ==
Jones died due to AIDS-related illness on June 19, 1989, eleven days before his thirty-sixth birthday, in Sherman Oaks, California.
