= The Fan (1981 film) =

1981 thriller feature film

- Theatrical release poster
- Directed by: Edward Bianchi
- Screenplay by: Priscilla Chapman; John Hartwell
- Based on: The Fan by Bob Randall
- Produced by: Robert Stigwood
- Starring: Lauren Bacall; Michael Biehn; James Garner; Maureen Stapleton
- Cinematography: Dick Bush
- Edited by: Alan Heim
- Music by: Pino Donaggio
- Distributed by: Paramount Pictures
- Release date: May 15, 1981
- Running time: 95 minutes
- Country: United States
- Language: English
- Budget: $9 million–$10.5 million (Note: Sources vary regarding the film's final budget: A Los Angeles Times articles notes a budget of $9 million, while a December 1981 Rolling Stone pieces states the film had a final budget of $10.5 million.)
- Box office: $3.1 million

The Fan is a 1981 American psychological thriller film directed by Edward Bianchi and starring Lauren Bacall, Michael Biehn, James Garner, and Maureen Stapleton. The plot follows a famous stage and film actress named Sally Ross (Bacall) who is stalked by a violent, deranged fan (Biehn), who begins killing those around her. The screenplay by Priscilla Chapman and John Hartwell was based on the 1977 novel by Bob Randall.

Development of The Fan began in 1979, and several iterations of the screenplay were produced by a number of writers before Chapman and Hartwell's version was finalized. Filmways initially offered to co-produce and distribute the film, offering to pay for the majority of its production budget. However, after its completion in 1980, Filmways backed out of the project due to their studio's experiencing financial troubles, after which Paramount Pictures acquired distribution rights.

The Fan was released in the United States on May 15, 1981, and was a box-office bomb, grossing $3.1 million. It received largely unfavorable reviews from film critics, though it would later acquire a cult following in the years after its release. Though Bacall was publicly critical of the film after its release, she later reflected that she felt her performance in it was among her best work.

== Plot ==
Douglas Breen, a deranged young New York City record store clerk, writes a rambling letter to stage and film star Sally Ross, reading: "Dear Miss Ross, I am your greatest fan, because unlike the others, I want nothing from you. The only thing that matters to me is your happiness."

Sally's secretary, Belle Goldman, has been intercepting Douglas's numerous disturbed letters, responding herself and asking him to stop. Douglas feels ignored, and becomes determined to meet with Sally and consummate his "love" for her. Sally, meanwhile, is rehearsing for a major stage musical while also reconnecting with her ex-husband and fellow actor Jake Berman. After Belle receives another explicit letter from Douglas, she brings it to Sally's attention; Sally scolds her for being rude to her fans, and brushes it off, reasoning that she has dealt with similar types of fans before. After Douglas is fired from his record store job, he begins stalking Sally, sitting outside of her apartment building and following her to rehearsals. He decides to hand-deliver a letter to her while she is rehearsing for the musical, but watches the man at the studio give the letter to Belle, who he realizes has been responding to his letters. Douglas follows Belle into the subway and slashes her face with a razor. She survives the attack, but is hospitalized. When police press her for information, Belle cannot recall the return addresses written on the obsessive letters to Sally, and Sally informs them that she does not keep the fan mail she receives.

Increasingly enraged by his lack of contact with Sally, Douglas breaks into her apartment and murders her maid, Elsa, in the bathroom, then trashes the apartment in a fit of rage. When Sally returns home accompanied by a private investigator and discovers what has happened, she also finds a threatening letter left behind by Douglas, which reads: "Dearest bitch, see how accessible you are? How would you like to be fucked with a meat cleaver?"

Sally, distraught, flees New York and retreats to a secluded house in the country, where she is visited by Jake. Meanwhile, at a bar, Douglas meets a man who cruises him for sex. The two go to the roof of Douglas's apartment, where the man begins to perform oral sex on him, but Douglas murders the man and sets his body on fire, leaving a fake suicide letter nearby to confuse the police. The opening night of the musical arrives, and Sally, having received word of Douglas's supposed suicide, returns to the city to perform. Douglas sits in the audience, watching her. After the show, Sally sits in her dressing room with the costume designer, Hilda. Douglas kills both Hilda and a nightwatchman while Sally removes her makeup. Covered in blood, he confronts Sally in her dressing room, and chases her through the now-empty theatre. She tries to fend him off with a riding crop, but he overpowers her and beats her with the crop while denigrating her for ignoring him. When he tries to kiss her, Sally immediately stands up to Douglas and angrily rebukes him for being a psychopath and a murderer; his rage subsides and he breaks down in tears, begging for Sally to love him, but she uses the lapse in his guard to stab him in the neck with his own knife, killing him. Sally exits the theatre, leaving Douglas's dead body in one of the seats, as a voiceover of his first letter to Sally is heard:

Dear Miss Ross, I have finally worked up enough courage to write you. You do not know me, but who I am does not matter. If there is such a thing as a soul, which is the basis of all life, then you are my soul and your life is my life. This is the first letter of what I hope will be an everlasting correspondence. Your greatest fan, Douglas Breen.

== Cast ==
- Lauren Bacall as Sally Ross
- James Garner as Jake Berman
- Maureen Stapleton as Belle Goldman
- Michael Biehn as Douglas Breen
- Héctor Elizondo as Inspector Raphael Andrews
- Anna Maria Horsford as Emily Stolz
- Kurt Johnson as David Branum
- Feiga Martinez as Elsa the Maid
- Parker McCormick as Hilda
- Reed Jones as Choreographer
- Kaiulani Lee as Douglas's sister
- Dana Delany as Linda, Record Store Saleswoman
- Dwight Schultz as Director
- Griffin Dunne as Production Assistant
- Liz Smith as herself

== Production ==
=== Development ===
The original screenplay for The Fan was adapted for the screen by Norman Wexler from Bob Randall's 1977 epistolary thriller novel of the same name. Filmways was initially attached to the project as its co-producer and distributor, and offered to supply $7 million of its proposed $9 million budget.

In 1979, director Waris Hussein was attached to the project as director, and filming was tentatively scheduled to begin in September of that year, though it was soon postponed until February 1980. The film subsequently underwent several rewrites: In February 1980, it was reported that Diana Hammond had been hired to rework the screenplay; however, screenwriters Priscilla Chapman and John Hartwell undertook further rewrites and are the film's only writers to receive credit. Hussein subsequently left the project over creative differences, after which Edward Bianchi overtook the role of director.

=== Casting ===
Producer Robert Stigwood initially considered Shirley MacLaine and Anne Bancroft for the lead before Bacall agreed to take the part.

=== Filming ===
The Fan was shot in New York City from April 1 to June 1980.

== Release ==
Filmways, the studio that originally agreed to distribute and co-produce the film, experienced a "financial crisis" resulting in an inability to compensate for the film's production budget. The film was then acquired by Paramount Pictures, who released it in the United States on May 15, 1981.

The film received a considerable amount of media attention due to being released a few months after the murder of John Lennon, who was shot to death by Mark David Chapman, a former fan, outside his apartment building The Dakota, a building where Bacall had been living for many years. However, it was a critical and commercial failure. In an interview with People magazine at the time of the film's release, Bacall expressed disappointment over the film's violent content, saying:

The Fan is much more graphic and violent than when I read the script. The movie I wanted to make had more to do with what happens to the life of the woman–and less blood and gore.

The film received an X rating in the United Kingdom from the British Board of Film Classification.

=== Box office ===
Released on May 15, 1981, The Fan grossed $3,082,096 in the United States box office. Based on its budget of approximately $9–10.5 million, the film was a box-office bomb. Rolling Stone included it in a December 1981 list of "Twenty-Four Films that Bombed in 1981".

=== Critical response ===
The film received mixed to negative reviews from critics. On Rotten Tomatoes, the film has a 40% rating based on 20 reviews.

Vincent Canby of The New York Times wrote, "With the help of some funny lines in the screenplay by Priscilla Chapman and John Hartwell, Miss Bacall transforms an essentially creaky, lady-in-distress thriller into something approaching a cinematic event ... 'The Fan' is a far from perfect movie, but it's an entertaining one." Variety stated, "While unavoidably predictable, The Fan is a pretty fair thriller, certainly better by far than most of the junk in the marketplace." Gene Siskel gave the film zero stars out of four and called it "nothing more than a cruel shock show" that "reveals nothing about human nature other than the money-grubbing nature of all those who have and will profit from its creation." Sheila Benson of the Los Angeles Times declared the film "a triumph of visual style over thin emotional content" and "a terror-filled but hollow effort." Gilbert Adair of The Monthly Film Bulletin dismissed it as a "mindless thriller."

Ron Cowan of the Statesman Journal praised Bacall's performance and deemed the film a "stylish and strongly atmospheric production", though he criticized it for being an ultimately "sludgy mixture of slow-moving events and shallowly conceived characters." Jacqi Tully of the Arizona Daily Star felt the film was exploitative and "lack[ed] substance", noting: "It seems Bianchi opted for the gruesome side of this tale. He spends far too much time showing us grisly knife attacks rather than explaining why these people act as they do. Psychosis and idolatry demand more than a superficial treatment."

Film scholar John Kenneth Muir declared The Fan a "hit or miss affair" in his 2010 book Horror Films of the 1980s, but praised Biehn's performance as "sinister and highly nuanced... stirring, naturalistic, and thoroughly nuanced."

=== Accolades ===
The film was nominated for a Golden Raspberry Award for Worst Original Song for "Hearts, Not Diamonds." The song lost to "Baby Talk" from the film Paternity.

=== Home media ===
The Fan was released on DVD in Region 1 by Paramount Pictures on September 24, 2002. On November 11, 2014, the film was released as an "on-demand" DVD-R through the online Warner Bros. Archive Collection. Scream Factory released the film on Blu-ray on November 19, 2019.

== Legacy ==
Although Bacall was publicly critical of the film upon its original release, she stated in 2004 that she felt her performance in it was "among her very best" work. James Garner reflected in his 2011 memoir that The Fan was one of the worst pictures he ever made, and that "the only saving grace was working with Betty Bacall".

Filmmaker David DeCoteau is a longtime admirer of the film, and contributed to an audio commentary on the film's 2019 Blu-ray release.

== Sources ==
- Garner, James; Winokur, Jon (2011). The Garner Files: A Memoir. New York City, New York: Simon & Schuster. ISBN 978-1-451-64261-2.
- Muir, John Kenneth (2010). Horror Films of the 1980s. Jefferson, North Carolina: McFarland. ISBN 978-0-786-45501-0.
- Wilson, John (2005). The Official Razzie Movie Guide: Enjoying the Best of Hollywood's Worst. New York City, New York: Grand Central Publishing. ISBN 978-0-446-69334-9.
