= Jack Warden =

American actor (1920–2006)

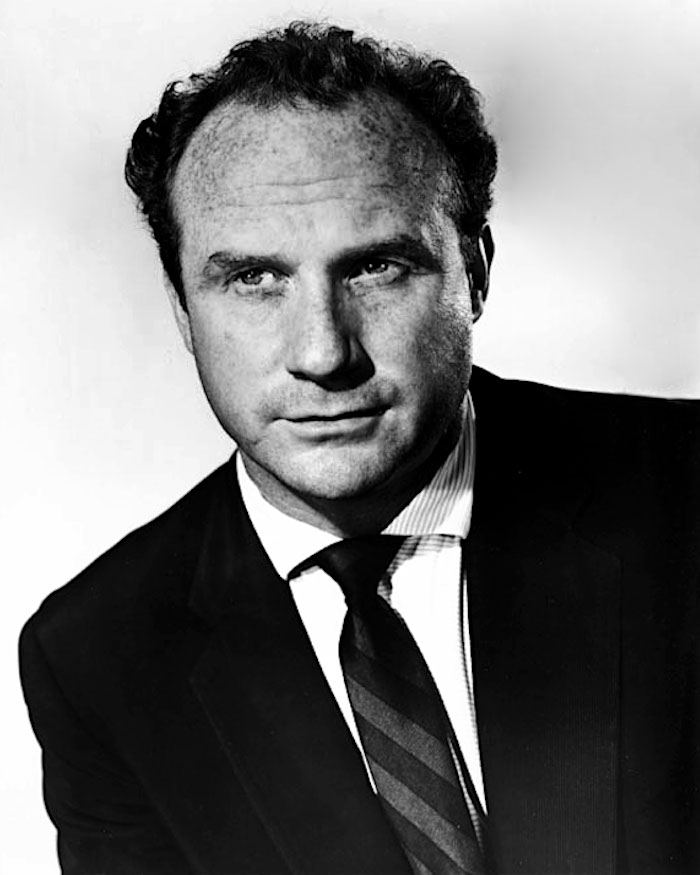
- Warden in the 1950s
- Born: John Warden Lebzelter Jr. September 18, 1920; Newark, New Jersey, U.S.
- Died: July 19, 2006 (aged 85); New York City, U.S.
- Other name: Johnny Costello
- Occupation: Actor
- Years active: 1945–2000
- Spouse: Vanda Dupre (m. 1958)
- Children: 1
- Military career
- Allegiance: United States
- Branch: United States Navy (1938–1941); United States Army (1942–1946)
- Service years: 1938–1941; 1942–1946
- Rank: Staff sergeant
- Conflicts: Yangtze Patrol; World War II; Western Front

Jack Warden (born John Warden Lebzelter Jr.; September 18, 1920 – July 19, 2006) was an American actor who worked in film and television. He was nominated for the Academy Award for Best Supporting Actor for Shampoo (1975) and Heaven Can Wait (1978). He received a BAFTA nomination for Shampoo, and won a Primetime Emmy Award for his performance in Brian's Song (1971).

== Early life ==
Warden was born in Newark, New Jersey, the son of Laura M. (née Costello) and John Warden Lebzelter, who was an engineer and technician. He was of Irish and Pennsylvania Dutch (German) ancestry. Raised in Louisville, Kentucky, he was expelled from high school for fighting. He eventually fought as a professional boxer under the name Johnny Costello. He fought in 13 bouts as a welterweight, but earned little money.

== Military service ==
Warden worked as a nightclub bouncer, tugboat deckhand, and lifeguard, before joining the United States Navy in 1938. He was stationed for three years in China with the Yangtze Patrol.

Warden joined the United States Merchant Marine in 1941, but he quickly tired of the long convoy runs.

In 1942, Warden moved to the United States Army, where he served as a paratrooper in the 501st Parachute Infantry Regiment, with the 101st Airborne Division in World War II.

In 1944, on the eve of the D-Day invasion (in which many of his friends died), Warden, then a staff sergeant, shattered his leg when he landed in a tree during a night-time practice jump in England. He spent almost eight months in the hospital recuperating, during which time he read a Clifford Odets play and decided to become an actor. Notably, Warden later portrayed a paratrooper from the 101st's rivals—the 82nd Airborne Division—in That Kind of Woman.

After leaving the army, Warden moved to New York City and studied acting on the G.I. Bill.

== Career ==
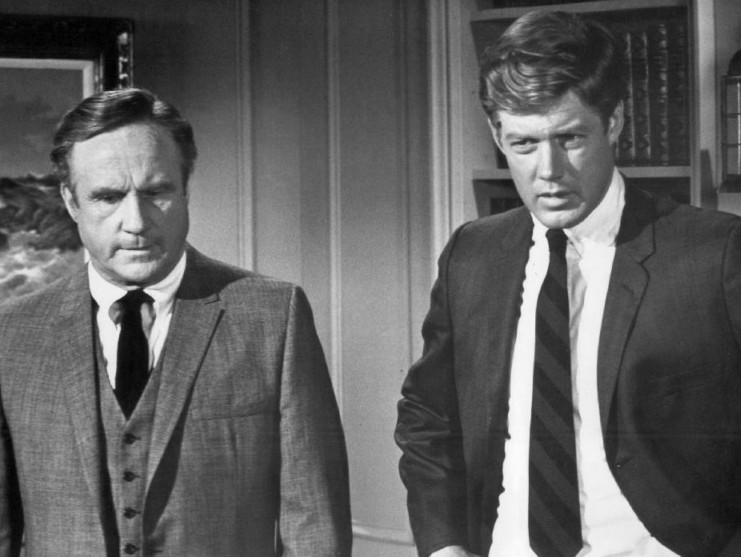
Warden (left) as Mike Haines with Frank Converse as Det. Johnny Corso in ABC's N.Y.P.D. (1968)

Warden joined the company of Theatre '47 of Dallas, moving there and performing with them for five years. In 1948, he made his television debut on the anthology series The Philco Television Playhouse and also appeared on the series Studio One. His first film roles were uncredited bit parts in the 1950 films The Asphalt Jungle and Sunset Boulevard. He was also in the 1951 film You're in the Navy Now, which also featured the screen debuts of Lee Marvin and Charles Bronson. Warden appeared in his first credited film role in 1951 in The Man with My Face.

From 1952 to 1955, Warden appeared in the television series Mister Peepers with Wally Cox. In 1953, he was cast as a sympathetic corporal in From Here to Eternity. Warden's breakthrough film role was Juror No. 7, a salesman who wants a quick decision in a murder case, in 12 Angry Men.

Warden guest-starred in many television series over the years, such as Marilyn Maxwell's ABC drama series, Bus Stop, and David Janssen's ABC drama, The Fugitive. He received a Primetime Emmy Award for Outstanding Supporting Actor in a Drama Series for his performance as Chicago Bears coach George Halas in the television movie, Brian's Song. He was twice nominated for his starring role in the 1980s comedy/drama series Crazy Like a Fox.

Warden was nominated for the Academy Award for Best Supporting Actor twice: for his performances in Shampoo and Heaven Can Wait. He also had notable roles in Bye Bye Braverman, The Man Who Loved Cat Dancing, All the President's Men, The White Buffalo, ...And Justice for All, Being There, Used Cars (in which he played dual roles), The Verdict, Problem Child and its sequel, as well as While You Were Sleeping, Guilty as Sin and the Norm Macdonald comedy Dirty Work. His final film was The Replacements in 2000, opposite Gene Hackman and Keanu Reeves.

== Personal life ==
Warden married French actress Vanda Dupre on October 10, 1958. They had one son, Christopher. Although they separated in the late 1970s, the couple never legally divorced.

Warden's health declined in his later years, which resulted in his retirement from acting in 2000. He lived for the rest of his life in Manhattan, New York City, with his girlfriend, Marucha Hinds.

== Death ==
Warden died of heart and kidney failure in a New York City hospital on July 19, 2006, at the age of 85.

== Filmography ==
=== Film ===
Year	Title	Role	Notes
1950	The Asphalt Jungle	Bit Role	Uncredited
1950	Sunset Boulevard	Party Guest	Uncredited
1951	You're in the Navy Now	Tommy Morse	Uncredited
1951	The Frogmen	Crew Member	Uncredited
1951	The Man with My Face	Walt Davis	
1952	Red Ball Express	Undetermined Role	Uncredited
1953	From Here to Eternity	Corporal Buckley	
1957	Edge of the City	Charles Malik	Alternate title: A Man Is Ten Feet Tall
1957	The Bachelor Party	Eddie Watkins, the Bachelor	
1957	12 Angry Men	Juror #7	
1958	Darby's Rangers	Master Sergeant Saul Rosen	
1958	Run Silent, Run Deep	Yeoman 1st Class "Kraut" Mueller	
1959	The Sound and the Fury	Ben Compson	
1959	That Kind of Woman	George Kelly	
1960	Wake Me When It's Over	Dave "Doc" Farrington	
1961	The Lawbreakers	Captain/Acting Police Commissioner Matthew Gower	Film adaptation of The Asphalt Jungle television episode "The Lady and the Lawyer"
1962	Escape from Zahrain	Huston	
1963	Donovan's Reef	Doctor William Dedham	
1964	The Thin Red Line	First Sergeant Welsh	
1966	Blindfold	General Prat	
1968	Bye Bye Braverman	Barnet Weinstein	
1971	The Sporting Club	Earl Olive	
1971	Summertree	Herb	
1971	Who Is Harry Kellerman and Why Is He Saying Those Terrible Things About Me?	Dr. Solomon F. Moses	
1971	Welcome to the Club	General Strapp	
1973	The Man Who Loved Cat Dancing	Dawes	
1974	Billy Two Hats	Sheriff Henry Gifford	
1974	The Apprenticeship of Duddy Kravitz	Max	
1975	Shampoo	Lester Karpf	Nominated – Academy Award for Best Supporting Actor; Nominated – BAFTA Award for Best Actor in a Supporting Role
1976	All the President's Men	Harry M. Rosenfeld	
1977	Raid on Entebbe	Lt. Gen. Mordechai Gur	
1977	The White Buffalo	Charlie Zane	
1978	Heaven Can Wait	Max Corkle	Nominated – Academy Award for Best Supporting Actor
1978	Death on the Nile	Doctor Ludwig Bessner	
1979	The Champ	Jackie	
1979	Dreamer	Harry	
1979	Beyond the Poseidon Adventure	Harold Meredith	
1979	...And Justice for All	Judge Francis Rayford	
1979	Being There	President "Bobby" of the United States	
1980	Used Cars	Roy L. Fuchs, Luke Fuchs	
1981	The Great Muppet Caper	Mike Tarkanian, the News Editor	
1981	Carbon Copy	Nelson Longhurst	
1981	Chu Chu and the Philly Flash	The Commander	
1981	So Fine	Jack Fine	
1982	The Verdict	Mickey Morrissey	
1984	Crackers	Garvey	
1985	The Aviator	Moravia	
1985	Alice in Wonderland	Owl	
1986	The Cosmic Eye	Rocko	Voice
1987	September	Lloyd	
1988	Dead Solid Perfect	Hubert 'Bad Hair' Wimberly	
1988	The Presidio	Sergeant Major Ross Maclure	
1990	Everybody Wins	Judge Harry Murdoch	
1990	Problem Child	"Big" Ben Healy	
1991	Problem Child 2	"Big" Ben Healy	
1992	Passed Away	Jack Scanlan	
1992	Night and the City	Al Grossman	
1992	Toys	Old General Zevo	
1993	Guilty as Sin	Moe	
1994	Bullets Over Broadway	Julian Marx	Nominated – Awards Circuit Community Award for Best Cast Ensemble
1995	While You Were Sleeping	Saul	
1995	Things to Do in Denver When You're Dead	Joe Heff	
1995	Mighty Aphrodite	Tiresias	
1996	Ed	Chubb	
1997	The Island on Bird Street	Boruch	
1997	The Volunteers	Richie	
1998	Chairman of the Board	Armand McMillan	
1998	Bulworth	Eddie Davers	
1998	Dirty Work	'Pops' McKenna	
1999	A Dog of Flanders	Jehan Daas	
2000	The Replacements	Edward O'Neil	

=== Television ===
Year	Title	Role	Notes
1952	Tales of Tomorrow	Steve	1 episode
1952	Mister Peepers	Chicago Cabbie	1 episode
1953	The Campbell Playhouse		1 episode
1953	Man Against Crime	Deck Hand	2 episodes
1954–1955	Kraft Television Theatre	Various roles	2 episodes
1954–1955	Studio One	Various roles	3 episodes
1955	Justice	Two roles	"Flight from Fear" and "Save Me Now"
1956	The Alcoa Hour	Frank Doran	1 episode
1956	Climax!	Lieutenant Ravenna	"Flame-Out in T-6"
1958–1959	Playhouse 90	Various roles	3 episodes
1959	Five Fingers	Fitzgerald	"The Moment of Truth"
1959	Bonanza	Mike Wilson	"The Paiute War"
1959–1960	The Twilight Zone	James A. Corry, Mouth McGarry	"The Lonely", "The Mighty Casey"
1959–1960	The Untouchables	Larry Halloran; Otto Frick	The George 'Bugs' Moran Story, The Otto Frick Story
1960	Outlaws		2 episodes
1961	Route 66	Adam Darcy	The Clover Throne
1961	Checkmate	Farrell	"Between Two Guns"
1961	Bus Stop	Joe Harrison	"Accessory by Consent"
1961	The Asphalt Jungle	Deputy Police Commissioner Matthew Gower	13 episodes
1962	Naked City	Cornelius Daggett	"Face of the Enemy"
1962	Naked City	Steve Lollo	"The King of Venus Will Take Care of You"
1962	Naked City	Sam Langen	"The Spectre of the Rose Street Gang"
1962	Target: The Corruptors	Jerry Skala	"The Organizers, Parts 1 and 2"
1962	Tales of Wells Fargo	Brad Axton	"The Traveler"
1962	Route 66	Sandor Biro	"Feat of Strength"
1962	Going My Way	Carl Wiczinski	"Not Good Enough for Mary"
1962	Wagon Train	Martin Onyx	"The Martin Onyx Story"
1963	Route 66	Major Barbon	"Two Strangers and an Old Enemy"
1963	77 Sunset Strip	Max Eames	"Flight 307"
1964	Breaking Point	Carlo Scotti	"No Squares in My Family Circle"
1964	The Great Adventure	Latham	1 episode
1964	Bewitched	Rex Barker	"It Shouldn't Happen to a Dog"
1965	The Virginian	John Conway	"Shadows of the Past"
1965	Dr. Kildare	Ernie Duffy	1 episode
1966	The Wackiest Ship in the Army	Major Simon Butcher	29 episodes
1967	The Fugitive	Alex Patton	"Concrete Evidence"
1967	The Invaders	Barney Cahill	1 episode
1967–1969	N.Y.P.D.	Lieutenant Mike Haines	49 episodes
1971	The Face of Fear	Lieutenant George Coy	Television film
1971	Brian's Song	George Halas	ABC Movie of the Week; Primetime Emmy Award for Outstanding Performance by an Actor in a Supporting Role in a Drama
1971	What's a Nice Girl Like You...?	Lieutenant Burton	ABC Movie of the Week
1972	Wheeler and Murdoch	Sam Wheeler	Television film
1972	Lieutenant Schuster's Wife	Captain Patrick Lonergan	Television film
1974	The Godchild	Sergeant Dobbs	Television film
1975	Journey from Darkness	Fred Hartman	Television film
1976	Jigsaw John	"Jigsaw" John St. John	15 episodes
1979–1980	The Bad News Bears	Morris Buttermaker	23 episodes
1983	Hobson's Choice	Henry Horatio Hobson	Television film
1984	Helen Keller: The Miracle Continues	Mark Twain	Television film
1984–1986	Crazy Like a Fox	Harrison "Harry" Fox Sr.	35 episodes Nominated – Primetime Emmy Award for Outstanding Lead Actor in a Comedy Series (1985–1986)
1985	A.D.	Nerva	Television miniseries
1987	Hoover vs. The Kennedys: The Second Civil War	J. Edgar Hoover	Television film
1988	Police Story: The Watch Commander	Joe Wilson	Television film
1989	Knight & Daye	Hank Knight	1 episode
1990	Judgment	Claude Fortier	Television film
1995	Problem Child 3: Junior in Love	Big Ben	Television film
1997	Ink	Timothy Logan	1 episode
1999	The Norm Show	Harry	1 episode

== Awards and nominations ==
Year	Award	Category	Film	Result	Ref.
1975	Academy Awards	Best Supporting Actor	Shampoo	Nominated	
1978	Academy Awards	Best Supporting Actor	Heaven Can Wait	Nominated	
1994	Awards Circuit Community Awards	Best Cast Ensemble	Bullets Over Broadway	Nominated	
1975	British Academy Film Awards	Best Actor in a Supporting Role	Shampoo	Nominated	
1972	Primetime Emmy Awards	Outstanding Performance by an Actor in a Supporting Role in a Drama	Brian's Song	Won	
1985	Primetime Emmy Awards	Outstanding Lead Actor in a Comedy Series	Crazy Like a Fox	Nominated	
1986	Primetime Emmy Awards	Outstanding Lead Actor in a Comedy Series	Crazy Like a Fox	Nominated	
