= Şenol Coşkun =

Turkish actor (1988–2006)

- Born: 12 November 1988; Istanbul, Turkey
- Died: 29 November 2006 (aged 18); Istanbul, Turkey
- Occupation: Actor
- Years active: 1995–2006

Şenol Coşkun (12 November 1988 – 29 November 2006) was a Turkish child actor.

== Biography ==
Born in Istanbul, Coşkun was a fan of the Galatasaray S.K. during his early childhood. In 1995, he pursued a career in acting when he met the film director Ünal Küpeli and starred in his film Zıpçıktı in which he portrayed the lead role. The film is an adaptation of the 1990 film Problem Child.

Coşkun was among Turkey's most popular child actors following the success of Zıpçıktı. On television, he was often featured as a supporting character in soap operas starring Haluk Bilginer.

== Death ==
Coşkun died in a car crash in Istanbul on 29 November 2006, two and a half weeks after his 18th birthday.
