= Michael Oliver (actor) =

American actor (born 1981)

Michael Oliverius
- Born: Michael Joshua Oliverius; October 10, 1981 (age 44); Los Angeles, California, U.S.
- Other name: Mike Ponce
- Occupations: Child model, Child actor
- Years active: 1989–1996
- Spouse: Magnolia Ponce (m. 2016; div. 2022)
- Family: Dianne Ponce (mother/manager); Matthew Oliverius (father)

Michael Joshua Oliverius (born October 10, 1981) is an American former child actor better known by his stage name Michael Oliver.

Oliver is best known for his role as "Junior" in the movie Problem Child and its sequel Problem Child 2. He also played Sam Dalton In Dillinger and Capone in 1995.

== Early life and career ==
Born in Los Angeles, California, Oliver's career started at the age of 2. His first job was as a model in a Sears catalog. At age 6, he appeared in a Chevron commercial where he wore glasses and had his voice dubbed over. After seeing Oliver in the Chevron commercial, a casting agent for the film Problem Child tracked Oliver down and cast him in the role days later.

When Problem Child was released in 1990, Oliver's appearance reminded people of a young Ron Howard as "Opie Taylor" in the Andy Griffith Show. It became a "surprise hit," spawned two sequels and an animated series. Problem Child 2 followed in 1991; however, the script was considered not in par with the original and repeatedly resorted to adult language, thus limiting the film's overall appeal. Michael Oliver retired from acting when he was 15. In 2015, it was reported that Oliver was happy with his private life away from the celebrity scene and had said he was enjoying "a nice, quiet existence" although he expressed he was grateful for the time he had spent in the spotlight as a child star.

On a 2011 episode of the radio show Loveline, Oliver called in while former co-star Gilbert Gottfried was guest hosting. In 2012, Oliver, along with the cast and crew of Problem Child and Problem Child 2, reunited for a photoshoot supporting the John Ritter Foundation.

In 2022, after being married since 2016 and separated since 2019, Oliver filed for a divorce from his ex-wife Magnolia Ponce citing irreconcilable differences.

== Lawsuit with Universal Pictures ==
After completion of Problem Child 2, Universal Pictures sued Oliver and Oliver's manager-mother Dianne Ponce for extorting his acting contract. Universal Pictures claimed the day before filming, Ponce threatened to remove her son from production unless his original payment of $80,000 be raised to $500,000. Universal agreed, but would be out of pocket $4 million if Oliver backed out.

A Superior Court jury ruled that the contract was unenforceable, with Universal Pictures having entered into it under duress, and that Ponce and Oliver were obliged to return the difference between the $250,000 Universal had thus far paid and the $80,000 originally negotiated.

== Filmography ==
Film
Year	Film	Role	Other notes
1990	Problem Child	Junior Healy	
1991	Problem Child 2	Junior Healy	
1994	Forrest Gump	Red Headed Teen	(uncredited)
1995	Dillinger and Capone	Sam Dalton	
1996	Eraser	Russian Teen	(uncredited)
Television
Year	Title	Role	Notes
1990	Amen	Max	1 episode
1991	Drexell's Class	Mitchell	1 episode
1991	The Munsters Today	Young Andy	1 episode
1995	Platypus Man	Rusty	1 episode

== Awards and nominations ==
Year	Award	Result	Category	Film or series
1990–1991	Young Artist Award	Nominated	Best Young Actor Guest Starring or Recurring Role in a TV Series	Drexell's Class
1992–1993	Young Artist Award	Nominated	Best Youth Actor Leading Role in a Motion Picture Comedy	Problem Child 2
