= David's Mother =

1994 television film directed by Robert Allan Ackerman

- DVD cover
- Genre: Drama
- Written by: Bob Randall
- Directed by: Robert Allan Ackerman
- Starring: Kirstie Alley; Sam Waterston; Stockard Channing; Michael A. Goorjian; Chris Sarandon; Phylicia Rashad
- Music by: David Mansfield
- Country of origin: United States
- Original language: English

Production
- Executive producers: Jennifer Alward; Bob Randall
- Producers: Julian Marks; Fran Bell; Clara George
- Cinematography: Walt Lloyd
- Editor: Susan B. Browdy
- Running time: 92 minutes
- Production companies: Hearst Entertainment Productions; Morgan Hill Films

Original release
- Network: CBS
- Release: April 10, 1994

David's Mother is a 1994 American drama television film directed by Robert Allan Ackerman, and written by Bob Randall. It stars Kirstie Alley as a devoted mother trying to cope with her autistic teenage son David (Michael Goorjian). The film aired on CBS on April 10, 1994. It has also aired internationally; in the United Kingdom, it can often be seen on television movie channels True Movies 1 and True Movies 2. It has also been released in home entertainment formats in countries including the United States, the United Kingdom, and Australia.

The film has won three Primetime Emmy Awards, and received a Golden Globe Award nomination.

== Plot ==
Sally Goodson has always tried to do what is best for her autistic son David, always blaming herself for the way David is. Sally lives alone with David in a New York City apartment and is often visited by her sister Bea, who tries to help Sally turn her life around by getting out a little more and giving David some space, but Sally rarely lets him out of her sight. In the end, her husband Philip had an affair, left his family and remarried; and their daughter Susan chose to live with him. They couldn't handle Sally's devotion to David and didn't feel they were getting enough attention.

Sally, having enough to cope with in her life, is visited by a social worker, Gladys Johnson, who informs her that David must go into a care home, but Sally refuses to send him to a home because of the way he was treated as a child in his previous care home. Gladys then gives her some time with David before she has to make arrangements. Bea manages to talk Sally round and sets her up on a date with wallpaper salesman John Nils; they begin to see each other, and he even teaches David to work a VCR, something Sally thought he could never do. Things go well until Sally makes plans to move when she is forced to give up David to a care home; her plans cause an argument between her and John, as she didn't tell him of the move. Sally is finally forced to give up David, as he is permanently taken in by the care home.

== Cast ==
- Kirstie Alley as Sally Goodson
- Sam Waterston as John Nils
- Stockard Channing as Bea
- Michael A. Goorjian as David Goodson
- Chris Sarandon as Philip
- Phylicia Rashad as Gladys Johnson

== Awards and nominations ==
Year	Award	Category	Nominee(s)	Result	Ref.
1994	Artios Awards	Best Casting for TV Movie of the Week	Reuben Cannon	Nominated	
1994	Primetime Emmy Awards	Outstanding Lead Actress in a Miniseries or a Special	Kirstie Alley	Won	
1994	Primetime Emmy Awards	Outstanding Supporting Actor in a Miniseries or a Special	Michael A. Goorjian	Won	
1994	Primetime Emmy Awards	Outstanding Individual Achievement in Writing in a Miniseries or a Special	Bob Randall	Won	
1995	Cinema Audio Society Awards	Outstanding Achievement in Sound Mixing for Television – Movie of the Week or Mini-Series	Chaim Gilad, David E. Fluhr, John Asman, and Melissa Sherwood Hofmann	Nominated	
1995	Golden Globe Awards	Best Actress in a Miniseries or Motion Picture Made for Television	Kirstie Alley	Nominated	
1995	Humanitas Prize	90 Minute or Longer Network or Syndicated Television	Bob Randall	Won	

== Releases ==
David's Mother has been released on VHS and DVD format. In the United States, the film received its DVD release on May 4, 2004, by Trinity Home Entertainment. In the UK, the film has been released several times. The first VHS was released by Odyssey Entertainment It was also released on VHS as part of a "Tear Jerker Collection". On DVD it was released by Odyssey Entertainment on September 25, 2000, which includes the trailer and cast information. It was re-released on DVD by Infinity Entertainment on February 4, 2008. In Australia, the film was released on DVD by Payless Entertainment on January 24, 2008.
