= The Magic Show =

Musical

- Original Production Art by David Edward Byrd
- Music: Stephen Schwartz
- Lyrics: Stephen Schwartz
- Book: Bob Randall
- Productions: 1974 Broadway

The Magic Show is a one-act musical with a score by Stephen Schwartz and a book by Bob Randall, starring magician Doug Henning. Produced by Edgar Lansbury, Joseph Beruh, and Ivan Reitman, it opened on Broadway on May 28, 1974, at the Cort Theatre, where it ran for 1,920 performances, closing on December 31, 1978. Henning was nominated for the Tony Award for Best Featured Actor in a Musical and director Grover Dale was nominated for the Tony Award for Best Direction of a Musical.

The show originally began life as Spellbound, produced by Reitman with a book by David Cronenberg and music by Howard Shore. That version premiered at the Royal Alexandra Theatre in Toronto in 1973, starring Henning and Jennifer Dale. When Reitman took it to New York, the book and score were entirely replaced, but Henning's illusions and magic tricks remained unchanged.

The Magic Show was a rare Broadway musical with a star who could neither sing nor dance. As composer-lyricist Stephen Schwartz told critic Peter Filichia, "This wasn't the case of writing for a star, but writing around a star."

== Synopsis ==
The setting for the show is a seedy nightclub, the Top Hat, where an aging alcoholic magician, Feldman the Magnificent, chews the scenery in his overly grand performance. Manny, the Top Hat owner, wants to replace him and brings in Doug, who is very unconventional and has an assistant named Cal. Cal is in love with Doug, but he does not notice her and is focused on advancing his career. Donna and Dina are the rock act in the club. One of them dates the nephew of a big agent named Goldfarb, who is coming to the club to check out Donna and Dina's act, and everyone is excited.

Meanwhile, Doug pays little attention to Cal and decides that he needs a "beautiful assistant". Cal is hurt, as Doug conjures up the beautiful Charmin. Donna and Dina get jealous, and along with Feldman, plot to expose the secrets to Doug's tricks during the show. Doug finally realizes he loves Cal, and gets to her before she leaves. Charmin is sent back to wherever she came from, and all ends up well.

== Musical numbers ==
- Up to His Old Tricks - Entire Company
- Solid Silver Platform Shoes - Dina and Donna
- Lion Tamer - Cal
- Style - Feldman and Company
- Charmin's Lament - Charmin
- Two's Company - Dina and Donna
- The Goldfarb Variations - Dina, Feldman, Donna, Manny and Charmin
- Doug's Act - Doug
- A Bit of Villainy - Feldman, Dina and Donna
- West End Avenue - Cal
- Sweet, Sweet, Sweet - Charmin, Manny, Mike and Steve
- Before Your Very Eyes - Dina, Donna and Feldman

== Cast and characters ==
Character	Broadway
Character	1974
Dina	Cheryl Barnes
Doug	Doug Henning
Manny	Robert LuPone
Donna	Annie McGreevey
Charmin	Anita Morris
Steve	Lloyd Sannes
Goldfarb	Sam Schacht
Cal	Dale Soules
Mike	Ronald Stafford
Feldman	David Ogden Stiers

Notable Broadway cast replacements (1974–1978)

- Doug: Jeffrey Mylett (character name changed to "Jeff")
- Charmin: Loni Ackerman

== Opening night band ==
- Stephen Reinhardt, keyboards, musical director
- Paul Shaffer, keyboards
- Steve Manes, bass
- Brian McCormick, guitar
- Gerry Weiner, guitar
- Joey Saulter, drums
- Charles Birch, percussion

== Reception ==
Reviews for the show were mixed. In the New York Times, Clive Barnes wrote what he called "an adulterated rave", because "Mr. Henning is terrific. He is the greatest illusionist I have ever seen … On the other hand, the show is awful. This is a 'Magic Show' where they should keep the magic and abandon the show." The Times' Sunday critic Walter Kerr concurred that “If the star of the occasion, magician Doug Henning, were entirely serious about his business, he would promptly make the rest of the show disappear.” However, Kerr concluded that "the show is the kind that parents will take children to on the pretext that they are doing the children a favor. But they go for their own fun, really."

Some critics were fonder of the show. In One More Kiss, his book surveying Broadway musicals of the 1970s, Ethan Mordden wrote that the show's success was "first, because Henning really did have a wonderful act, and, second, because the frame was amusing enough. Director-choreographer Grover Dale gave it atmosphere, David Ogden Stiers as the cast-off magician was a wily piece of camp, and Schwartz's score is capable and surprising." At least one of the songs, "West End Avenue", became a standard; Peter Filichia wrote that it was "one of the most popular cabaret songs of the late '70s".

== DVD release ==
A filmed performance staged especially for the cameras in 1980, directed by Norman Campbell at the Queen Elizabeth Theatre in Toronto, was issued on DVD by Image Entertainment in 2001. Originally intended for cinema release, this production differed notably from the original Broadway production, lacking several of the most memorable songs, such as "West End Avenue" and "Solid Silver Platform Shoes". Doug Henning reprised his original starring role, while Didi Conn co-starred as Cal.
