= Top-rated United States television programs of 1977–78 =

This table displays the top-rated primetime television series of the 1977–78 season as measured by Nielsen Media Research.

Rank	Program	Network	Rating
1	Laverne & Shirley	ABC	31.6
2	Happy Days	ABC	31.4
3	Three's Company	ABC	28.3
4	60 Minutes	CBS	24.4
4	Charlie's Angels	ABC	24.4
4	All in the Family	CBS	24.4
7	Little House on the Prairie	NBC	24.1
8	Alice	CBS	23.2
8	M*A*S*H	CBS	23.2
10	One Day at a Time	CBS	23.0
11	How the West Was Won	ABC	22.5
12	Eight Is Enough	ABC	22.2
13	Soap	ABC	22.0
14	The Love Boat	ABC	21.9
15	NBC Monday Night Movie	NBC	21.7
16	Monday Night Football	ABC	21.5
17	Fantasy Island	ABC	21.4
17	Barney Miller	ABC	21.4
19	Project U.F.O.	NBC	21.2
20	ABC Sunday Night Movie	ABC	20.8
20	The Waltons	CBS	20.8
22	Barnaby Jones	CBS	20.6
23	Hawaii Five-O	CBS	20.4
24	ABC Monday Night Movie	ABC	20.3
25	Rhoda	CBS	20.1
26	The Incredible Hulk	CBS	19.9
26	Family	ABC	19.9
26	Welcome Back, Kotter	ABC	19.9
29	On Our Own	CBS	19.6
30	The Big Event — Sunday	NBC	19.4
