= Amy Yasbeck =

American actress

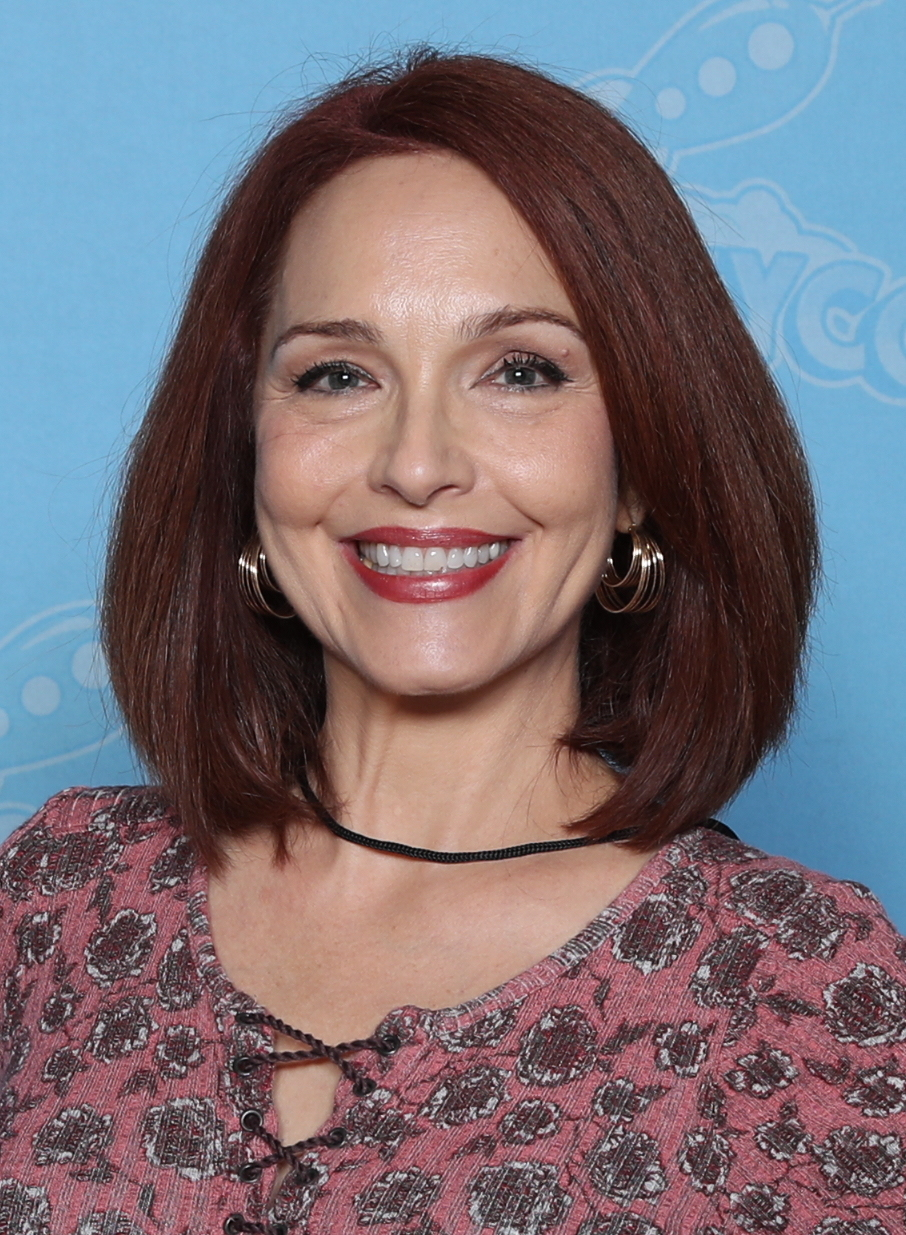
- Yasbeck in 2019
- Born: September 12, 1962 (age 64); Blue Ash, Ohio, U.S.
- Occupation: Actress
- Years active: 1985–present
- Spouse: John Ritter (m. 1999; died 2003)
- Children: 1

Amy Yasbeck (born September 12, 1962) is an American actress and philanthropist. She is best known for her role as Casey Chappel Davenport on the sitcom Wings from 1994 to 1997 and for having played the mermaid Madison in the television film Splash, Too in 1988. Yasbeck has guest-starred in several television shows and appeared in the films House II: The Second Story, Pretty Woman, Problem Child, Problem Child 2, The Mask, Robin Hood: Men in Tights, and Dracula: Dead and Loving It. She is the widow of John Ritter and founder of The John Ritter Foundation for Aortic Health which supports research, and conducts advocacy and education, toward prevention of aortic dissections.

== Early life ==
Yasbeck was born in Blue Ash, Ohio, the daughter of Dorothy Louise Mary (née Murphy), a homemaker, and John Thomas Yazbeck, a butcher and grocery store owner. Her father was of Lebanese descent, while her mother was of Irish ancestry. As a child, Yasbeck was featured on the package art for the Betty Crocker Easy-Bake Oven. Years later, in 2000, she was presented with a new Easy-Bake Oven on the show I've Got a Secret, for which she was a regular panel member.

Yasbeck spent her primary and secondary years at two different Catholic schools: Summit Country Day School and Ursuline Academy. She enrolled in the theater program at the University of Detroit but did not graduate, leaving to pursue her acting career in New York City in 1983.

== Career ==
Early in her acting career, she appeared in Rockhopper, an unsold television pilot from 1985. Yasbeck has had guest-starring roles in many television shows, including Dallas, Spies, Werewolf, J.J. Starbuck, Magnum, P.I., China Beach, and Murphy Brown. She auditioned for the role of Elaine Benes on Seinfeld. She played Olivia Reed for four months between 1986 and 1987 on the long-running daytime drama Days of Our Lives. She played the starring role of the mermaid Madison in the Disney television film Splash, Too in 1988 (the role of Madison was originated by Daryl Hannah in the 1984 film Splash). Yasbeck had starring roles in the sitcoms Wings, Alright Already, and Life on a Stick and in films such as House II: The Second Story, Pretty Woman, Problem Child, Problem Child 2, and The Mask. She has twice worked with Mel Brooks: in 1993's Robin Hood: Men in Tights and 1995's Dracula: Dead and Loving It.

Yasbeck appeared once on That's So Raven as the mother of the character Chelsea. The episode originally aired on September 22, 2006. In late 2007, plans surfaced of a potential That's So Raven spin-off featuring Yasbeck and Anneliese van der Pol, who portrayed her daughter, with occasional appearances by Raven-Symoné. The show was scrapped due to van der Pol signing onto a Broadway play, and Yasbeck wanting to take a break from acting to focus on her family.

Yasbeck was a contestant on the syndicated version of Are You Smarter than a 5th Grader? in 2010.

In 2016, Yasbeck was on a hiatus from acting to focus on her family. She expressed interest in returning to acting at an undefined later time. In 2025, she was cast in Jonathan Hammond's short film Fireflies in the Dusk.

== Personal life ==
Yasbeck is the widow of actor John Ritter, with whom she had worked in several projects. She first met him at director Dennis Dugan's house during a read-through of their film Problem Child. They married in 1999.

Yasbeck and Ritter starred together in Problem Child 2 (1991) and guest-starred together in an episode of The Cosby Show that aired in 1991. Ritter guest-starred on Wings as Yasbeck's estranged husband in the season-seven episode "Love Overboard". The couple welcomed a child who transitioned at the age of 18. They married a year after their child's birth at the Murphy Theatre in Wilmington, Ohio.

On September 11, 2003, Ritter experienced chest pain and extreme nausea while rehearsing for 8 Simple Rules for Dating My Teenage Daughter. He was taken to the hospital by paramedics. Initially, Ritter was thought to be suffering a heart attack. At 10:48 that night, Ritter died. The cause of death was later determined to be an aortic dissection stemming from a previously undiagnosed congenital heart defect.

Yasbeck gave her blessing to the continuation of the sitcom, as 8 Simple Rules, where it was ultimately decided that Katey Sagal's character would assume the lead role as a widow.

On the September 5, 1990, episode of The Tonight Show Starring Johnny Carson, she said that her "great-great-great uncle" Charles Webb Murphy was the owner of the Chicago Cubs during their 1907 and 1908 championships.

=== The John Ritter Foundation for Aortic Health ===
Weeks after Ritter's death, Yasbeck established The John Ritter Foundation for Aortic Health which foundation supports research, and conducts advocacy and education, with the purpose of preventing deaths from thoracic aortic disease and aortic dissection. Yasbeck and her foundation were instrumental in the formation of The John Ritter Research Program in Aortic and Vascular Diseases at the University of Texas Health Science Center at Houston lead by Dianna M. Milewicz, MD, PhD, a recognized leader in aortic disease research, to overcome the pathology of aortic and vascular diseases. Yasbeck has appeared in media about her efforts including on Larry King Live on June 16, 2008, discussing heart disease, aortic dissection, and The John Ritter Foundation.

=== Wrongful death lawsuit ===
In 2004, Yasbeck, on behalf of her family, filed a $67 million wrongful death lawsuit against Providence Saint Joseph Medical Center and several doctors who treated her husband before his death, alleging they misdiagnosed his condition and contributed to his death. Several of the defendants settled out of court for a total of $14 million, including Providence St. Joseph, which settled for $9.4 million. On March 14, 2008, a jury split 9–3 in favor of two doctors, clearing those physicians of any wrongdoing.

== Filmography ==
=== Film ===
Year	Title	Role	Notes
1987	House II: The Second Story	Lana	
1990	Pretty Woman	Elizabeth Stuckey	
1990	Problem Child	Florence "Flo" Healy	
1991	Problem Child 2	Annie Young	
1992	The Nutt House	Diane Nutt	
1993	Robin Hood: Men in Tights	Maid Marian	
1994	The Mask	Peggy Brandt	
1995	Home for the Holidays	Ginny Johnson Drewer	
1995	Dracula: Dead and Loving It	Mina Seward	
1998	Denial	Claudia	
1998	The Odd Couple II	Stewardess	
2012	Little Women, Big Cars	Meg	
2012	Little Women, Big Cars 2	Meg	
2025	Fireflies in the Dusk	Edith	Short film

=== Television ===
Year	Title	Role	Notes
1985	Rockhopper	Sonia Petrova	Unsold TV pilot
1986–1987	Days of Our Lives	Olivia Reed	—
1987	Dallas	Mary Elizabeth	2 episodes
1987	Spies	Margo	Episode: "Right or Wrong"
1987	Werewolf	Deidra	Episode: "Nothing Evil in These Woods"
1987	J.J. Starbuck	Doreen	Episode: "Pilot"
1987–1988	Magnum, P.I.	Diana	4 episodes
1988	China Beach	Airplane Stewardess	Episode: "Pilot"
1988	Splash, Too	Madison Bauer	Television film
1989	Trenchcoat in Paradise	Nan Thompson	Television film
1989	Murphy Brown	Young Lady in Bar	Episode: "Why Do Fools Fall in Love?"
1989	Little White Lies	Vicki	Television film
1989	Generations	Carla	—
1990	Midnight Caller	Mary Lou Harper	Episode: "The Hostage Game"
1990	Poochinski	Frannie Reynolds	Unsold TV pilot
1990, 1993	Matlock	Model Lauren Chadwick / Cheryl Atkinson	2 episodes
1991	Murder, She Wrote	Connie Canzinaro	Episode: "Family Doctor"
1991	Dillinger	Elaine	Television film
1991	The Cosby Show	Alicia Evans	Episode: "Total Control"
1992	Get a Life	Evelyn	Episode: "Girlfriend 2000"
1992	Designing Women	Tiffany	Episode: "A Little Night Music"
1992	Quantum Leap	Frankie Washarskie	Episode: "Stand Up"
1993	Street Justice	Nancy	Rpisode: "The Wall"
1994	Diagnosis: Murder	Karen Davis	Episode: "The Restless Remains"
1994	Dave's World	Julie	Episode: "The Funeral"
1994–1997	Wings	Casey Chappel Davenport	—
1995	Platypus Man	Wendy	Episode: "Pilot"
1996	Bloodhounds II	Sharon	Television film
1996	Sweet Dreams	Laura Renault	Television film
1997–1998	Alright Already	Renee	—
1998	Dead Husbands	Betty Lancing	Television film
1999	It's Like, You Know...	Karen	Episode: "The Sweet Smell of Success"
2002	House Blend	Sally Harper	TV pilot
2003	Just Shoot Me!	Skyler	Episode: "For the Last Time, I Do"
2005	Life on a Stick	Michelle Lackerson	—
2006	That's So Raven	Joni Daniels	Episode: "The Ice Girl Cometh"
2007	Shorty McShorts' Shorts	Danielle	Voice, episode: "Flip-Flopped"
2010	Hot in Cleveland	Hailey Nash	Episode: "The Sex That Got Away"
2013	Bones	Diana Malkin	Episode: "The Archaeologist in the Cocoon"
2013	Modern Family	Lorraine	Episode: "Larry's Wife"
2015	Workaholics	Annette	Episode: "Gramps Demamp Is Dead"
2016	Pretty Little Liars	Claudia	Episode: "Do Not Disturb"

== Books ==
- Yasbeck, Amy (September 7, 2010). With Love and Laughter, John Ritter. New York: Gallery Books. ISBN 978-1-4165-9841-1.
