= Problem Child 3: Junior in Love =

1995 television film directed by Greg Beeman

- Dutch DVD cover
- Also known as: Problem Child 3
- Genre: Comedy; Family
- Based on: Characters by Scott Alexander and Larry Karaszewski
- Written by: Michael Hitchcock
- Directed by: Greg Beeman
- Starring: William Katt; Jack Warden
- Music by: David Michael Frank
- Country of origin: United States
- Original language: English

Production
- Executive producers: Robert Simonds; Brian Levant; Scott Alexander; Larry Karaszewski
- Producer: Anthony Santa Croce
- Cinematography: Peter Smokler
- Editor: Mallory Gottlieb
- Running time: 87 minutes
- Production companies: Telvan Productions; The Robert Simonds Company; MTE

Original release
- Network: NBC
- Release: May 13, 1995

Related
- Problem Child 2

Problem Child 3: Junior in Love (known onscreen as simply Problem Child 3) is a 1995 American children's television film directed by Greg Beeman and written by Michael Hitchcock. It is the third and final installment of the Problem Child trilogy created by Scott Alexander and Larry Karaszewski. The film premiered on NBC on May 13, 1995. It is the only film in the series not to receive a theatrical release.

In the film, Junior Healy, now a preteen, is infatuated with a girl named Tiffany, but she does not notice him. Things take a mischievous turn when he finds out there are three other boys interested in her as well.

== Plot ==
Junior Healy tells a story from multiple drawings in a coloring book, which depict his classroom where he is told by Miss Hicks that he got an "F" for not finishing his science project. Junior mentions that "it's all about sound waves" and the bell rings, causing a set of traps to trigger, and Miss Hicks to fall out a window. Murph Murphy, one of his classmates, rats him out, and the principal calls his dad, Ben, prompting him to take him to get help. They meet Sarah Gray, a therapist who tests him, and decides that he needs some activities to do. Junior takes this harshly, and does not approve of these options.

Junior is taken to a dance school, run by Lila Duvane, a tyrannical debutante, and hates it at first; but then he meets Tiffany, a girl who recently moved to town, but Murph informs him that three boys named Duke Phlim, Blade and Corky McCullum have already laid claim. Junior tries to proclaim his love to Tiffany, but fails miserably. At school, he is given a new teacher, the overbearing Mr. Burtis, who he traps in the same way he did to Miss Hicks. In his victory, Junior bites into an apple and feels pain. He and Ben go to a dentist's office where it is discovered by his nemesis Igor Peabody that he needs dental braces. Ben asks his father, Big Ben, for a $5,000 loan, which leads to disappointing results.

After meeting the trio and Tiffany, Junior decides to pursue scouting under Scoutmaster Eugene Phlim, also Duke's father. Afterwards, he decides to enroll in hockey. He gets beaten by Blade's team, prompting him to take part in a school production of Peter Pan, where Corky is the star and Junior is stuck playing a weed. Ben meets Sarah at Big Ben's, and it is discovered that she was dating Phlim, and subsequently broke up with him. Meanwhile, after Corky rudely mocks Junior about his braces, Junior sneaks on to the horse grounds at Corky's mansion and uses a slingshot on Corky's horse, causing it to rear and hurl Corky into the pool.

When Junior comes back to get his braces tightened, he gets his revenge for the humiliation he received from them by releasing laughing gas that knocks Peabody and his nurse, Kiki, unconscious. They later wake up wearing braces, with her tied to the patient chair and him hanging from the ceiling fan.

Junior begins his plan of getting even with the three boys for bullying him. During the hockey tournament, Junior beats everyone of the opposing team players, and strikes Blade with a puck. After this, Junior is banned for life, and then, in the production of Peter Pan, he traps Corky by distracting the janitor, and pulling the rope attached to the suspension harness and crashing it down, severely injuring Corky and Duvane. Finally, seeking revenge for seeing Sarah, Philm and Duke challenge Ben and Junior to a relay race. Junior sabotages every obstacle on their side and he and Ben win.

With the three boys seriously injured and terrified of him, Junior finally tries to spend some time with Tiffany, who turns out to be a rich brat. In retaliation, he pranks her by tying the sash ribbon on her dress to a statue, and as she walks forward, it rips off. In her underwear, embarrassed and laughed at, she runs out crying, and Murph's sister Bertha, blaming Junior, chases after her. Junior finds a kinder girl, dressed as a witch and also wearing braces, whereas Ben and Sarah get together.

== Cast ==
- William Katt as Ben Healy
- Justin Chapman as Junior Healy
- Sherman Howard as Scoutmaster Eugene Phlim
- Carolyn Lowery as Sarah Gray
- Eric Edwards as Murph Murphy / Bertha Murphy
- Blake McIver Ewing as Corky McCullum
- Jennifer Ogletree as Tiffany
- Brock Pierce as Duke Phlim
- Jake Richardson as Blade
- Gilbert Gottfried as Dr. Igor Peabody
- Jack Warden as Big Ben Healy
- Ellen Albertini Dow as Lila Duvane
- Marianne Muellerleile as Miss Hicks
- Bruce Ed Morrow as Mr. Burtis
- Jacqueline Obradors as Conchita
- Kelli Thacker as Nurse Kiki
- Rance Howard as Janitor

== Home media ==
To date, Universal has not released the film on home video or DVD in North America, though it did have VHS and region 2 DVD and Blu-ray releases.
