= John Ritter =

American actor (1948–2003)

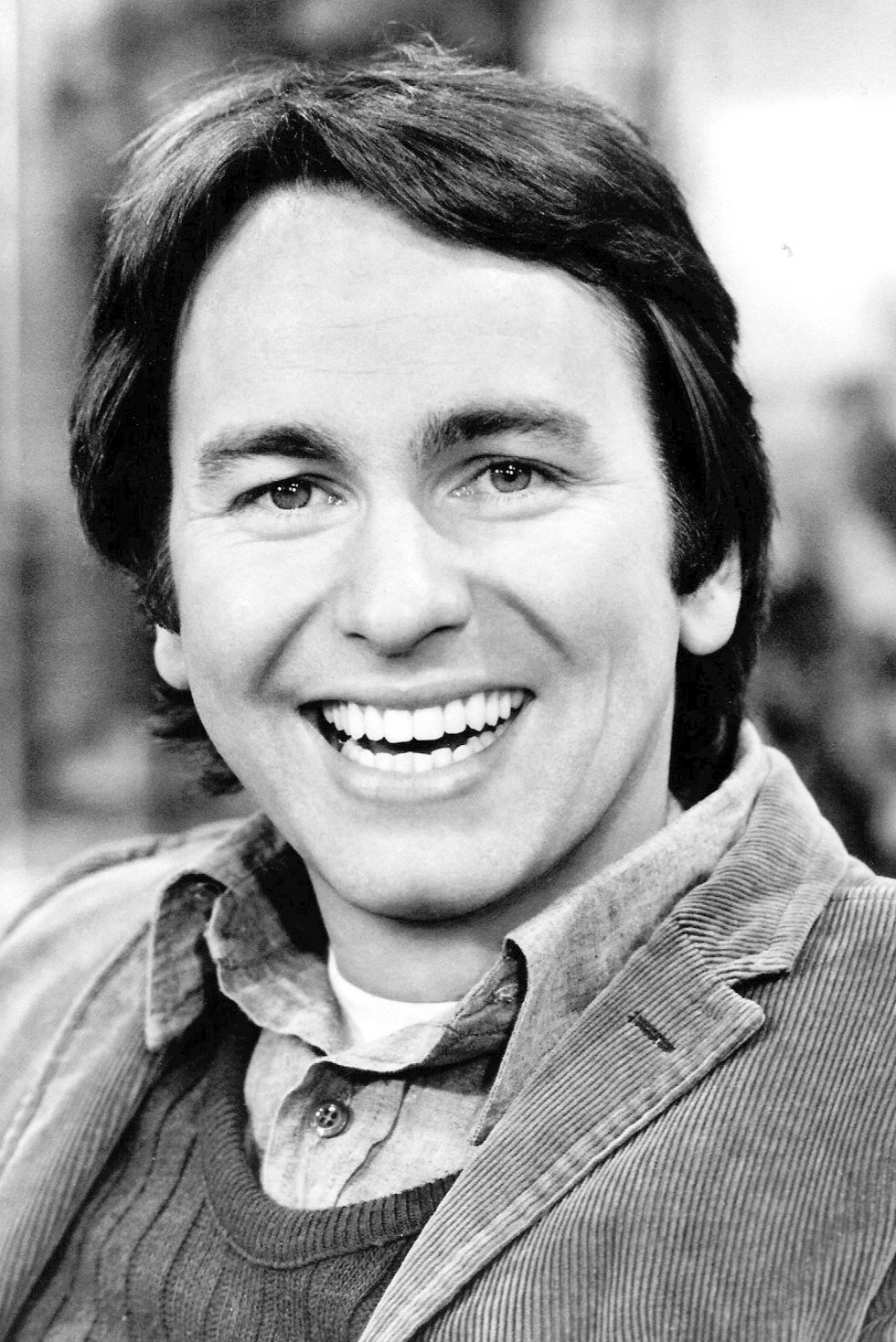
- Ritter in 1977
- Born: Jonathan Southworth Ritter; September 17, 1948; Burbank, California, U.S.
- Died: September 11, 2003 (aged 54); Burbank, California, U.S.
- Cause of death: Aortic dissection
- Resting place: Forest Lawn Memorial Park
- Education: University of Southern California
- Occupation: Actor
- Years active: 1968–2003
- Known for: Three's Company; Three's a Crowd; 8 Simple Rules
- Spouses: Nancy Morgan (m. 1977; div. 1996) Amy Yasbeck (m. 1999)
- Children: 4, including Jason and Tyler
- Parents: Tex Ritter (father); Dorothy Fay (mother)

Jonathan Southworth Ritter (September 17, 1948 – September 11, 2003) was an American actor and comedian. He was a son of the singing cowboy star Tex Ritter and the father of actors Jason and Tyler Ritter. He played Jack Tripper on the ABC sitcom Three's Company (1977–1984), and received a Primetime Emmy Award and a Golden Globe Award for the role in 1984. Ritter briefly reprised the role on the spin-off Three's a Crowd, which aired for one season, producing 22 episodes before its cancellation in 1985.

He appeared in over 100 films and television series combined and performed on Broadway, with roles including adult Ben Hanscom in It (1990), Problem Child (1990), Problem Child 2 (1991), a dramatic turn in Sling Blade (1996), and Bad Santa in 2003 (his final live action film, which was dedicated to his memory). His final roles include voicing the title character on the PBS children's program Clifford the Big Red Dog (2000–2003), for which he received four Daytime Emmy Award nominations, and as Paul Hennessy on the ABC sitcom 8 Simple Rules (2002–2003), a turn which garnered him a posthumous Primetime Emmy Award nomination.

== Early life ==
Ritter was born at Providence Saint Joseph Medical Center in Burbank, California. His father, Tex Ritter (1905–1974), was a singing cowboy and film star, and his mother, Dorothy Fay (née Southworth; 1915–2003), was an actress. He had an older brother. Ritter attended Hollywood High School, where he was student body president. While a teenager, Ritter's right eye was permanently injured by a projectile flying into the car in which he was riding. This resulted in his right pupil having a strange appearance and only having peripheral vision in that eye for the rest of his life. Ritter attended the University of Southern California and majored in psychology with plans to have a career in politics. He changed his major to theater arts and attended the USC School of Dramatic Arts (formerly School of Theatre). Ritter was a member of Phi Gamma Delta fraternity at USC. While still in college, Ritter traveled to the United Kingdom, the Netherlands, and West Germany to perform in plays. Ritter graduated in 1970. Along with having theater arts at USC, he had studied acting at the Stella Adler Academy.

== Career ==
=== Film and television ===
Ritter headlined several stage performances. After his graduation from USC in 1970, his first television acting experience was as a campus revolutionary in the television series Dan August starring Burt Reynolds and future Three's Company co-star Norman Fell. Ritter made his film debut in the 1971 Disney film The Barefoot Executive. He made guest appearances on the television series Hawaii Five-O, M*A*S*H, and many others. He had a recurring role as the Reverend Matthew Fordwick on the drama series The Waltons from October 1972 to December 1976. Because he was not a weekly cast member, he had time to pursue other roles, which he did until December 1976, when he left for a starring role in the hit sitcom Three's Company (the Americanized version of the 1970s British series Man About the House) in 1977. In 1978, Ritter played Ringo Starr's manager on the television special Ringo. In 1982, Ritter provided the voice of Peter Dickinson in the animated film The Flight of Dragons.

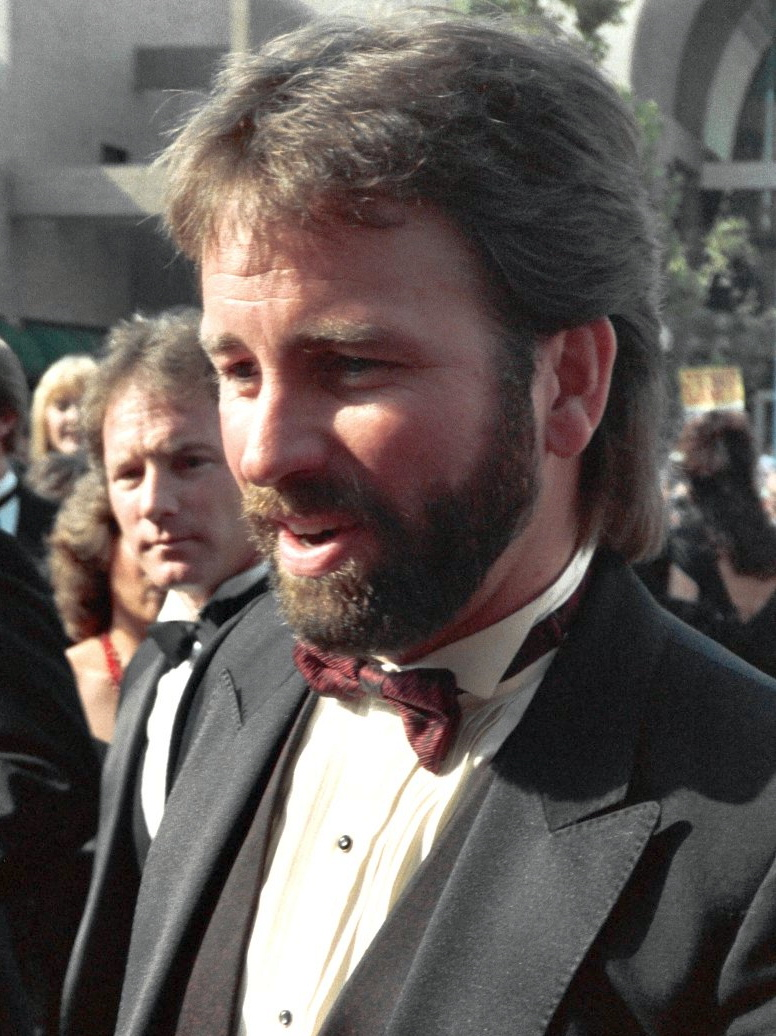
Ritter in 1988

Ritter became a household name on Three's Company, portraying struggling culinary student Jack Tripper with two female roommates. Ritter co-starred opposite Joyce DeWitt and Suzanne Somers, and later Jenilee Harrison and Priscilla Barnes. Much of the comedy centered around Jack's pretending to be gay to keep the old-fashioned landlords appeased over the co-ed living arrangements. The series spent several seasons near the top of the ratings in the United States before ending in 1984, and Ritter received a Primetime Emmy Award and a Golden Globe Award for the role. A year-long spin-off, Three's a Crowd, ensued, as the Jack Tripper character has a live-in girlfriend and runs his own bistro. During the run of Three's Company, Ritter appeared in the films Americathon (1979), Hero at Large (1980), and They All Laughed (1981). In 1986, he played the role of Dad in the music video for Graham Nash's song "Innocent Eyes".

Hooperman was Ritter's first regular television role after Three's Company. Detective Harry Hooperman inherits a run-down apartment building and hires Susan Smith (Debrah Farentino) to run it. In 1988, Ritter was nominated for both an Emmy Award and a Golden Globe Award for his work on Hooperman. Ritter won a People's Choice Award for this role. From 1992 to 1995, Ritter returned to television for three seasons as John Hartman, aide to a U.S. Senator, in Hearts Afire. He played Garry Lejeune / Roger Tramplemain in the production Noises Off in 1992.

After his time on television, he appeared in a number of films, including the comedy Problem Child (1990) and its sequel Problem Child 2 (1991). He co-starred with Jim Belushi in 1987's Real Men and played the lead role in Blake Edwards' 1989 film Skin Deep. He appeared in the film version of Noises Off (1992), rejoined his Hearts Afire co-star Billy Bob Thornton in the Oscar-winning Sling Blade (1996, playing a kindhearted, gay, discount-store manager), and co-starred with Olivier Gruner in the 1996 action film Mercenary. His final live action film was Bad Santa (2003) with Thornton.

Ritter starred in many television films, including Stephen King's It (1990), Danielle Steel's Heartbeat (1993) with Polly Draper, Gramps (1995), co-starring with Andy Griffith, Rob Hedden's The Colony (1995) with Hal Linden, and It Came from the Sky in 1999 with Yasmine Bleeth. Ritter made guest appearances on television shows, such as Felicity, Ally McBeal, Scrubs, Buffy the Vampire Slayer, and Law & Order: Special Victims Unit. He provided the voice of the title character in the animated children's show Clifford the Big Red Dog and its animated film adaptation Clifford's Really Big Movie (2004), a role for which he received four Emmy nominations. His final film was Stanley's Dinosaur Round-Up (2006), an animated direct-to-DVD film based on the television series Stanley, which was dedicated to his memory. At the time of his death, he was starring in 8 Simple Rules... for Dating My Teenage Daughter. He received a posthumous Primetime Emmy Award nomination for his role.

=== Theater ===
In 2000, Ritter co-starred with Henry Winkler in Neil Simon's The Dinner Party at the Music Box Theatre on Broadway, portraying Claude Pichon. It ran for 364 performances. Ritter won the Theatre World Award in 2001 for his performance in that work.

He starred in J For J at LA's Court Theatre from March 14 until April 21, 2002, alongside Jeff Kober and Jenny Sullivan. It was directed by Joseph Fuqua and written by Jenny Sullivan. In 2003, Ritter made his final stage appearance in All About Eve at the Ahmanson Theatre.

== Personal life ==
On October 16, 1977, Ritter married actress Nancy Morgan, with whom he had three children. They divorced in 1996. In 1998, Ritter and Amy Yasbeck had a child, who transitioned from female to male at the age of 18. In 1999, Ritter and Yasbeck were married at the Murphy Theatre in Wilmington, Ohio. Yasbeck played his love interest in the first two Problem Child films, though as two different characters. Yasbeck played Ritter's wife in two sitcom appearances. In 1991, both were guest stars on The Cosby Show, in which Yasbeck played the in-labor wife of Ritter's basketball coach character. In 1996, Ritter guest-starred on Yasbeck's sitcom, Wings, as the estranged husband of Yasbeck's character, Casey.

== Death ==
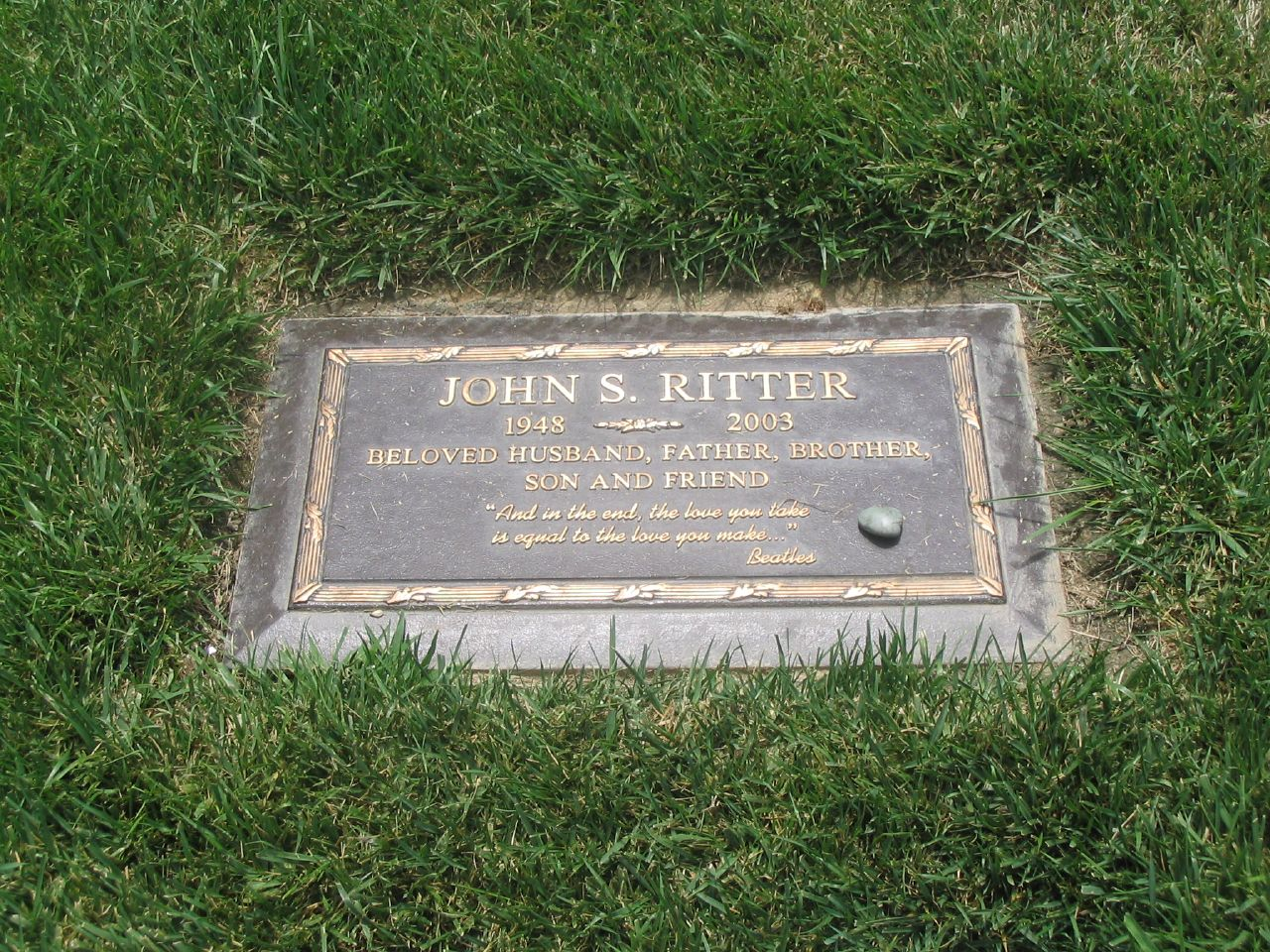
Ritter's grave marker

On September 11, 2003, Ritter was rehearsing for 8 Simple Rules, when he suddenly fell ill, sweating profusely, vomiting, and complaining of chest pain. He initially thought he had food poisoning. Ritter’s condition deteriorated after he went to his dressing room. He was taken to the Providence Saint Joseph Medical Center, coincidentally the same hospital where he was born, at 6:00 p.m. Ritter was initially treated by emergency room physicians for an assumed heart attack; however, his condition quickly deteriorated. He was diagnosed with an aortic dissection and taken into surgery. He was pronounced dead at 10:48 p.m, at the age of 54.

A private funeral for Ritter was held in Los Angeles on September 15, 2003, after which he was interred at Forest Lawn Memorial Park in Hollywood Hills.

=== Wrongful death lawsuit ===
In 2004, Ritter's widow Amy Yasbeck, on behalf of herself and Ritter's children, filed lawsuits against doctors involved in Ritter's treatment and Providence St. Joseph Medical Center, claiming Ritter’s death was caused by "misdiagnosing his condition" and "failing to provide proper treatment in connection with an ascending aortic aneurysm that would have saved his life." Some of those lawsuits were settled out of court in 2008, for a total of $14 million, including a settlement for $9.4 million with Providence St. Joseph. A $67 million wrongful-death lawsuit was brought against two of the physicians who treated Ritter on the day of his death for misdiagnosing his condition as a heart attack and for failing to detect an enlargement of Ritter's aorta when he had a full-body scan in 2001. The physicians argued Ritter arrived to the hospital in grave condition and that time was constrained in measures to attempt to save his life. The jury split 9–3 in favor of the two doctors, clearing those physicians of any wrongdoing, citing the scan which revealed he had calcium deposits in his arteries but his aorta appeared normal and that he did not schedule a follow up with a cardiologist.

=== Response and legacy ===
Many of Ritter's colleagues expressed sorrow following the news of his death. Zach Braff, who worked with Ritter on Scrubs, called Ritter a "comic hero" of his and said he had approached series creator Bill Lawrence to get Ritter to play his character J.D.'s father (which Ritter did for two episodes and was slated to return for a third the week following his death). Katey Sagal testified in the wrongful death lawsuit, calling Ritter a "funny man who was funny like nobody's business". His Three's Company co-star Joyce DeWitt remarked he was "Impossible to forget. Impossible not to love."

8 Simple Rules... for Dating My Teenage Daughter was later retitled 8 Simple Rules following Ritter's death and continued for one and a half more seasons before its cancellation in 2005. Ritter's character, Paul Hennessy, was said to have died after collapsing in a grocery store while buying milk. ABC aired the first three episodes of the show's second season that had been taped before his death, each of which was introduced by Katey Sagal. The remainder of the show dealt with the family trying to grapple with Paul's death. New male characters, played by James Garner and David Spade, were added to the main cast as Ritter's replacements. Shortly before his death, Ritter had done a week-long taping with Hollywood Squares, which was aired as a tribute to him, introduced by Henry Winkler, the executive producer of the show and a very close friend of Ritter's. Four days after Ritter's death, Nick at Nite ran an all-night Three's Company marathon dedicated to his memory.

In 2004, Ritter was posthumously given an Emmy nomination for playing Paul Hennessy in 8 Simple Rules... for Dating My Teenage Daughter but lost to Kelsey Grammer for his performances as Frasier Crane of Frasier. Upon accepting his trophy, Grammer's remarks included comments made in tribute and remembrance of Ritter. Ritter's final films, Bad Santa and Clifford's Really Big Movie, along with a Season 4 episode of Scrubs (his character in this series died, as well), the Season 8 King of the Hill episode "Stressed for Success" (in which he played music teacher Eugene Grandy) and Stanley's Dinosaur Round-Up (in which he played Great Uncle Stew) were all dedicated to his memory.

On June 6, 2008, Hollywood High School dedicated a mural of Ritter painted by Eloy Torrez.

==== The John Ritter Foundation for Aortic Health ====
In March 2010, the Thoracic Aortic Disease (TAD) Coalition, in partnership with Yasbeck and the John Ritter Foundation (JRF), announced the creation of the "Ritter Rules" which are life-saving reminders to recognize, treat and prevent thoracic aortic dissection. The purpose of the JRF is to provide accurate information to the general public about the disease and its risk factors, provide support to individuals who have thoracic aortic disease or have lost a loved one to the disease, and improve the identification of individuals at risk for aortic dissections and the treatment of thoracic aortic disease through medical research. Yasbeck worked with the University of Texas Health Science Center at Houston (UTHealth) to establish the John Ritter Research Program in Aortic and Vascular Diseases with the goal of preventing premature deaths due to aortic dissection by identifying genetic mutations that predispose individuals to thoracic aortic aneurysms and dissections.

== Filmography ==
=== Film ===
Year	Title	Role	Notes
1971	The Barefoot Executive	Roger	Film debut
1971	Scandalous John	Wendell	
1972	The Other	Rider	
1973	The Stone Killer	Hart	
1975	The Prisoner of Second Avenue	Elevator Passenger	Uncredited
1976	Nickelodeon	Franklin Frank	
1977	Breakfast in Bed	Paul	Short film
1979	Americathon	President Chet Roosevelt	
1980	Hero at Large	Steve Nichols	
1980	Wholly Moses!	Satan (The Devil)	
1981	They All Laughed	Charles Rutledge	
1982	The Flight of Dragons	Peter Dickinson	Voice, direct-to-video
1987	Real Men	Bob Wilson, Agent Pillbox, CIA	
1989	Skin Deep	Zachary "Zach" Hutton	
1990	Problem Child	Benjamin "Ben" Healy Jr.	
1991	Problem Child 2	Benjamin "Ben" Healy Jr.	
1991	The Real Story of O Christmas Tree	Piney	Voice, direct-to-video
1992	Noises Off	Garry Lejeune, Roger Tramplemain	
1992	Stay Tuned	Roy Knable	
1994	North	Ward Nelson	
1996	Sling Blade	Vaughan Cunningham	
1996	Mercenary	Jonas Ambler	Direct-to-video
1997	Nowhere	Moses Helper	
1997	A Gun, a Car, a Blonde	Duncan, The Bartender	
1997	Hacks	Hank	
1998	Montana	Dr. Wexler	
1998	The Truth About Lying	Simon Barker	
1998	Shadow of Doubt	Steven Mayer	
1998	I Woke Up Early the Day I Died	Robert Forrest	
1998	Bride of Chucky	Police Chief Warren Kincaid	
2000	Panic	Dr. Josh Parks	
2000	Tripfall	Tom Williams	
2000	Lost in the Pershing Point Hotel	Christian Therapist	
2000	Terror Tract	Bob Carter	
2000	Tadpole	Stanley Grubman	
2001	Nuncrackers	Narrator	Voice, direct-to-video
2002	Man of the Year	Bill	
2003	Manhood	Eli	
2003	Bad Santa	Bob Chipeska	Posthumous release; final live-action film
2004	Clifford's Really Big Movie	Clifford the Big Red Dog	Voice, posthumous release; dedicated in memory
2005	Stanley's Dinosaur Round-Up	Great Uncle Stew	Voice, posthumous release; final film role; dedicated in memory

=== Television ===
Year	Title	Role	Notes
1967	The Dating Game	Contestant	Selected as the "Winning Bachelor"
1968	Crazy World, Crazy People	Various characters	TV special
1970	Dan August	Coley Smith	Episode: "Quadrangle for Death"
1971	Hawaii Five-O	Ryan Moore, Mike Welles	2 episodes
1972–1976	The Waltons	Rev. Matthew Fordwick	Recurring role (18 episodes)
1973	Medical Center	Ronnie	Episode: "End of the Line"
1973	Bachelor-at-Law	Ben Sykes	Unsold pilot
1973	M*A*S*H	Pvt. Carter	Episode: "Deal Me Out"
1974	Kojak	Kenny Soames	Episode: "Deliver Us Some Evil"
1974	Owen Marshall, Counselor at Law	Greg	Episode: "To Keep and Bear Arms"
1974	The Bob Newhart Show	Dave	Episode: "Sorry, Wrong Mother"
1975	Movin' On	Casey	Episode: "Landslide"
1975	Rhoda	Vince Mazuma	Episode: "Chest Pains"
1975	Mannix	Cliff Elgin	Episode: "Hardball"
1975	Great Performances	Richard	Episode: "Who's Happy Now?"
1975	The Bob Crane Show	Hornbeck	Episode: "Son of the Campus Capers"
1975	Petrocelli	John Oleson	Episode: "Chain of Command"
1975	Barnaby Jones	Joe Rockwell	Episode: "The Price of Terror"
1975	The Streets of San Francisco	John 'Johnny' Steiner	Episode: "Murder by Proxy"
1975	The Night That Panicked America	Walter Wingate	TV film
1975	The Mary Tyler Moore Show	Reverend Chatfield	Episode: "Ted's Wedding"
1975	The Rookies	Hap Dawson	Episode: "Reluctant Hero"
1976	Starsky & Hutch	Tom Cole	Episode: "The Hostages"
1976	Doc	Jeff, George	Episode: "A Little Bit of Soap"
1976	Rhoda	Jerry Blocker	Episode: "Attack on Mr. Right"
1976	Phyllis	Paul Jameson	Episode: "The New Job"
1977–1984	Three's Company	Jack Tripper	Lead role (174 episodes)
1977	The Love Boat	Dale Riley	Episode: "Oh, Dale"
1977	Tattletales	Himself (panelist)	Syndication
1978	Ringo	Marty Flesh	TV film
1978	Leave Yesterday Behind	Paul Stallings	TV film
1978	$25,000 Pyramid	Himself (panelist)	Syndication
1979	The Ropers	Jack Tripper	Episode: "The Party"
1980	The Associates	Chick	Episode: "The Censors"
1980	The Comeback Kid	Bubba Newman	TV film
1980	John Ritter: Being of Sound Mind and Body	Himself, Various Characters	TV special
1981	Insight	Frankie	Episode: "Little Miseries"
1982	Pray TV	Tom McPherson	TV film
1982	In Love with an Older Woman	Robert Christenberry	TV film
1982	The Fantastic Miss Piggy Show	Himself (guest star)	TV special
1983	Sunset Limousine	Alan O'Black	TV film
1983	The Love Boat	Ben Cummins	Episode: "The Emperor's Fortune"
1984	Love Thy Neighbor	Danny Loeb	TV film
1984	Pryor's Place	Himself (guest star)	Episode: "The Showoff"
1984–1985	Three's a Crowd	Jack Tripper	Lead role (22 episodes)
1985	Letting Go	Alex Schuster	TV film
1986	Unnatural Causes	Frank Coleman	TV film
1986	A Smoky Mountain Christmas	Judge Harold Benton	TV film
1986	Life with Lucy	Himself (guest star)	Episode: "Lucy Makes a Hit with John Ritter"
1987	The Last Fling	Phillip Reed	TV film
1987	Prison for Children	David Royce	TV film
1987–1989	Hooperman	Det. Harry Hooperman	Lead role (42 episodes)
1988	Mickey's 60th Birthday	Dudley Goode	TV special
1988	Tricks of the Trade	Donald Todsen	TV film
1989	Have Faith	Rick Shepherd	Episode: "The Window"
1989	My Brother's Wife	Barney Rusher	TV film
1990	It	Ben Hanscom	TV miniseries
1990	The Dreamer of Oz: The L. Frank Baum Story	L. Frank Baum	TV film
1991	The Cosby Show	Ray Evans	Episode: "Total Control"
1991	The Summer My Father Grew Up	Dr. Paul Saunders	TV film
1991	Anything but Love	Patrick Serreau	Recurring role (5 episodes)
1992	Fish Police	Inspector Gill	Voice, 6 episodes
1992–1995	Hearts Afire	John Hartman	Lead role (54 episodes)
1993	Heartbeat	Bill Grant	Television film
1993	The Only Way Out	Jeremy Carlisle	Television film
1993	The Larry Sanders Show	Himself (guest star)	Episode: "Off Camera"
1994-1995	Dave's World	John Hartman	3 episodes
1995	Gramps	Clarke MacGruder	TV film
1995	The Colony	Rick Knowlton	TV film
1995	NewsRadio	Dr. Frank Westford	Episode: "The Shrink"
1995	The Larry Sanders Show	Himself (guest star)	Episode: "The Fourteenth Floor"
1996	Unforgivable	Paul Hegstrom	TV film
1996	Wings	Stuart Davenport	Episode: "Love Overboard"
1996	For Hope	Date No. 5	TV film (uncredited)
1996	Touched by an Angel	Mike O'Connor, Tom McKinsley	2 episodes
1997	Loss of Faith	Bruce Simon Barker	TV film
1997	A Child's Wish	Ed Chandler	TV film
1997	Dead Man's Gun	Harry McDonacle	Segment: "The Great McDonacle"
1997	Over the Top	Justin Talbot	Episode: "The Nemesis"
1997	Buffy the Vampire Slayer	Ted Buchanan	Episode: "Ted"
1997–2004	King of the Hill	Eugene Grandy	Voice, 4 episodes
1998	Chance of a Lifetime	Tom Maguire	TV film
1998	Ally McBeal	George Madison	2 episodes
1998	Dead Husbands	Dr. Carter Elston	TV film
1999	Veronica's Closet	Tim	Episode: "Veronica's Favorite Year"
1999	Holy Joe	Rev. Joe Cass	TV film
1999	It Came from the Sky	Donald Bridges	TV film
1999	Lethal Vows	Dr. David Farris	TV film
2000–2003	Clifford the Big Red Dog	Clifford	Voice, main role
2000	Chicago Hope	Joe Dysmerski	Episode: "Simon Sez"
2000	Batman Beyond	Dr. David Wheeler	Voice, episode: "The Last Resort"
2000	Family Law	Father Andrews	Episode: "Possession is Nine Tenths of the Law"
2000–2002	Felicity	Mr. Andrew Covington	Recurring role (7 episodes)
2001	Tucker	Marty	Episode: "Homewrecker for the Holidays"
2002	The Ellen Show	Percy Moss	Episode: "Gathering Moss"
2002	Law & Order: Special Victims Unit	Dr. Richard Manning	Episode: "Monogamy"
2002	Breaking News	Lloyd Fuchs	Episode: "Pilot"
2002	Scrubs	Sam Dorian	Special guest role (seasons 1-2); 2 episodes
2002–2003	8 Simple Rules... for Dating My Teenage Daughter	Paul Hennessy	Lead role; 31 episodes

=== Video games ===
Year	Title	Role	Note
2001	Clifford the Big Red Dog: Learning Activities	Clifford	
2002	Clifford the Big Red Dog: Musical Memory Games	Clifford	
2003	Clifford the Big Red Dog: Phonics	Clifford	Posthumous release

== Awards and honors ==
Association	Year	Category	Work	Result
Daytime Emmy Awards	2001	Outstanding Performer in an Animated Program	Clifford the Big Red Dog	Nominated
Daytime Emmy Awards	2002	Outstanding Performer in an Animated Program	Clifford the Big Red Dog	Nominated
Daytime Emmy Awards	2003	Outstanding Performer in an Animated Program	Clifford the Big Red Dog	Nominated
Daytime Emmy Awards	2004	Outstanding Performer in an Animated Program	Clifford the Big Red Dog	Nominated
Primetime Emmy Awards	1978	Outstanding Lead Actor in a Comedy Series	Three's Company	Nominated
Primetime Emmy Awards	1981	Outstanding Lead Actor in a Comedy Series	Three's Company	Nominated
Primetime Emmy Awards	1984	Outstanding Lead Actor in a Comedy Series	Three's Company	Won
Primetime Emmy Awards	1988	Outstanding Lead Actor in a Comedy Series	Hooperman	Nominated
Primetime Emmy Awards	1999	Outstanding Guest Actor in a Comedy Series	Ally McBeal	Nominated
Primetime Emmy Awards	2004	Outstanding Lead Actor in a Comedy Series	8 Simple Rules	Nominated
Golden Globe Awards	1979	Best Actor in a Musical/Comedy	Three's Company	Nominated
Golden Globe Awards	1980	Best Actor in a Musical/Comedy	Three's Company	Nominated
Golden Globe Awards	1984	Best Actor in a Musical/Comedy	Three's Company	Won
Golden Globe Awards	1987	Best Actor in a Mini-Series or Motion Picture Made for Television	Unnatural Causes	Nominated
Golden Globe Awards	1988	Best TV Actor in a Musical/Comedy	Hooperman	Nominated
People's Choice Awards	1988	Favorite Male Performer in a New TV Program	Hooperman	Won
Screen Actors Guild Awards	1997	Outstanding Performance by a Cast in a Motion Picture	Sling Blade (shared w/co-stars)	Nominated

- 1983: Star on the Walk of Fame – 6627 Hollywood Boulevard; he and Tex Ritter were the first father-and-son pair to be so honored in different categories.
