= Justin Chapman =

American journalist and child actor

- Born: Justin Douglas Chapman; September 21, 1985 (age 40); Glendora, California, U.S.
- Education: Los Angeles County High School for the Arts; Los Angeles City College; Pasadena City College; University of California, Berkeley
- Occupation: Child actor
- Years active: 1994–1999
- Family: Sharon F. Green (mother); Howard D. Chapman III (father)

Justin Douglas Chapman (born September 21, 1985) is an American author and journalist, actor, musician, and politician. He currently serves as District 6 Council Liaison/Field Representative to Pasadena City Councilmember and former Vice Mayor Steve Madison. He is the author of the travel memoir Saturnalia: Traveling from Cape Town to Kampala in Search of an African Utopia, published by Rare Bird Books in January 2015. Chapman was the youngest elected member of the Altadena Town Council at age 19. He is currently attending University of Southern California and graduated from the University of California, Berkeley in 2009. He has written for over 20 publications. As a professional child actor he often performed in commercials, television shows, and movies. He lives in Pasadena, California.

== Background and education ==
Justin Chapman was born on September 21, 1985, in Glendora, California. He is the son of Sharon F. Green, a teacher in the Pasadena Unified School District, and Howard D. Chapman III, a handyman and computer programmer. He has two younger siblings, Galvin T. Chapman and Kelsey M. Chapman. Chapman grew up in Altadena, California. He has dual citizenship with the United States and Ireland.

Chapman graduated from the Los Angeles County High School for the Arts (LACHSA), where he majored in theatre. He went on to attend Los Angeles City College, Pasadena City College, and University of California, Berkeley, where he majored in Mass Communications/Media Studies. He has a master's degree in Public Diplomacy from the University of Southern California, where he served as an editor of the Public Diplomacy Magazine.

== Professional child actor ==
Chapman was a professional child actor from 1994 to 1999. He starred in dozens of commercials, television shows, and movies. He played the lead role of Junior Healy in Problem Child 3: Junior in Love, for which he was nominated Best Young Actor in the first annual Young Star Awards by The Hollywood Reporter in 1995. He played Chuck Norris as a kid in Walker, Texas Ranger and played South Park creator Trey Parker as a kid in BASEketball. He also appeared in Jingle All the Way, Family Matters, and The Pauly Shore Show.

== Journalism ==
Since 2005, Chapman has been a practicing professional journalist. He frequently contributes to Pasadena Weekly and has been published in over 20 publications, including LA Weekly, Berkeley Political Review, Pasadena Magazine, Daily Vision (Uganda), Patch, Skeptic Magazine, South Bay Magazine and Ventura Blvd. Magazine, among many others.

In 2015, he was nominated for a Los Angeles Press Club award for breaking the story about Joan Williams. In 1958 Williams, a light complexioned African American, was selected as Miss Crown City, a Rose Queen-like honor in which she would represent the City of Pasadena by riding in the city's float in the Rose Parade. However, after city officials discovered she was African American, they canceled the float, denied her ride in the parade, and denied her other benefits associated with the position. In 2013, nearly 60 years later, Chapman interviewed Williams for a Pasadena Weekly cover story and brought her story to light. The story ultimately resulted in an official apology from former Pasadena Mayor Bill Bogaard and an offer from Tournament of Roses Association executive director Bill Flynn for Williams to ride in the 2015 Rose Parade, which she did.

== Political career and community service ==
In 2005, Chapman was elected to the Altadena Town Council. He was the youngest elected member at age 19, having defeated the 57-year-old vice chairman of the council with 63% of the vote. In 2007, Chapman was re-elected to the council. Chapman founded and chaired the council's Education Committee and began a process to look into having Altadena secede from the Pasadena Unified School District and create its own school district.

Chapman served as Secretary on the American Civil Liberties Union Southern California Pasadena Foothills Chapter board of directors for five years. He currently serves as President of Men Educating Men About Health, a non-profit men's health organization that hosts the Get Healthy Pasadena health fair each year at Pasadena City College, as well as Secretary on the West Pasadena Residents' Association board of directors. He previously served as a Commissioner on the City of Pasadena's Northwest Commission. He is a member of the LA Press Club and the LA World Affairs Council.

== Published book ==
In January 2015 Rare Bird Books published Chapman's first book, Saturnalia: Traveling from Cape Town to Kampala in Search of an African Utopia, about his travels through Africa. Trainspotting author Irvine Welsh said this about the book: "The best and most arresting travel books are the ones that also take us on the author's inner journey. Justin Chapman's memoir is a perfect metaphor for contemporary American youth, painfully trying to work through its own baggage, and openly and sincerely seeking to engage with the world beyond the USA's established physical and cultural borders. Don't miss this one." Here is the book's description: "In the Spring of 2012, reporter and travel junkie Justin Chapman threw his cares to the wind and, by himself, set off on an epic journey across eight countries in Africa — from Cape Town, South Africa, to Mityana, Uganda — by bus, train, and boat. Along the way, he narrowly escaped being locked away in a mental institution, visited an impoverished township that is changing its future with the help of an art-based nonprofit, got into a life-threatening car crash, explored the mystical island of Zanzibar, lived with a group of Catholic priests, witnessed a witchcraft healing ceremony, discovered a pygmy opium den, and chased down riveting stories with a local journalist. He crossed cultural boundaries, found love and companionship in unusual places, and stared death — with all its visceral stench and gore — directly in the eyeballs. Saturnalia is an engrossing cultural and anthropological treatise like none other. By embarking on a journey of self-discovery and survival, Chapman explores what Africa really has to offer, and in the process, discovers surprising and unexpected relationships between people and places."

Chapman has traveled to 30 countries. He became interested in traveling in the 8th grade, when he was accepted into the People to People Student Ambassador Program founded by President Eisenhower.
