= Bob Randall (writer) =

American dramatist

- Born: Stanley B. Goldstein; August 20, 1937; New York City, New York, U.S.
- Died: February 11, 1995 (aged 57); New Milford, Connecticut, U.S.
- Occupations: Screenwriter, novelist
- Years active: 1972–1995

Bob Randall (born Stanley Goldstein; August 20, 1937 – February 11, 1995) was an American screenwriter, playwright, novelist, and television producer.

== Biography ==
Randall was born Stanley Goldstein on August 20, 1937, in the Bronx borough of New York City. Prior to becoming a writer, Randall worked as an advertising copywriter.

In 1977, Randall had his only screen acting role as J. M. Bedford in the short-lived television comedy series On Our Own, which he also created. The same year, Randall published the thriller novel The Fan, about an aging actress stalked by a psychotic young man. The novel won an Edgar Award for Best First Novel, and was adapted into the 1981 feature film of the same name starring Lauren Bacall and Michael Biehn.

In 1984, Randall began producing the network series Kate & Allie, and also served as a writer of 34 episodes. Randall later wrote the screenplay for the television film David's Mother (1994), which earned him one Primetime Emmy Award for Outstanding Writing for a Miniseries and a further three nominations in the same category.

== Death ==
Randall died in New Milford, Connecticut on February 11, 1995, aged 57, of AIDS-related illness. He was survived by Gary Pratt, his partner of 15 years.

== Bibliography ==
=== Novels ===
- The Fan (1977)
- The Next (1981)
- The Calling (1983)
- The Last Man on the List (1990)

=== Plays ===
- 6 Rms Riv Vu (1972)
- The Magic Show (1974)

== Filmography ==
Year	Title	Writer	Producer	Notes	Ref.
1977	On Our Own	No	No	Acting role: J. M. Bedford (21 episodes)	
1984–1989	Kate & Allie	Yes	Yes	Television series; 37 episodes	
1994	David's Mother	Yes	No		

== Accolades ==
Award	Year	Category	Nominated work	Outcome	Ref.
Primetime Emmy Award	1984	Outstanding Comedy Series	Kate & Allie	Nominated	
Primetime Emmy Award	1985	Outstanding Comedy Series	Kate & Allie	Nominated	
Primetime Emmy Award	1986	Outstanding Comedy Series	Kate & Allie	Nominated	
Primetime Emmy Award	1994	Outstanding Writing for a Miniseries	David's Mother	Won	
