= Michael Moore in TrumpLand =

- Theatrical release poster
- Directed by: Michael Moore
- Written by: Michael Moore
- Produced by: Michael Moore
- Starring: Michael Moore
- Cinematography: Jim Zunt
- Edited by: Doug Abel
- Production companies: Dog Eat Dog Films; IMG Films
- Release date: October 18, 2016 (IFC Center)
- Running time: 73 minutes
- Country: United States
- Language: English
- Box office: $149,090

Michael Moore in TrumpLand is a 2016 documentary film by Michael Moore about the 2016 United States presidential election campaign.

The film is based on a one-person show that Moore originally wanted to perform in Midland Theatre in Newark, Ohio on October 7, but management of the Midland Theatre chose not to honor a rental contract. He eventually held the show at the Murphy Theatre in Wilmington, Ohio, with the movie based on a recording of that performance over two nights in October.

== Premiere ==
The film's premiere, just 11 days after it was filmed, was on October 18, 2016 at the IFC Center in New York City, where tickets for the 400 seat venue were given out to the public for free. The premiere was followed by a Q&A with Moore. General showings around the United States started October 19, with the announcement of digital downloads available in the near future. Moore had announced the event on Twitter.

== Reception ==
On review aggregation website Rotten Tomatoes, the film has an approval rating of 54%, based on 35 reviews, with an average rating of 5.7/10. On Metacritic, the film has a weighted average score of 56 out of 100, based on 17 critics, indicating "mixed or average reviews".

The Guardian wrote, "TrumpLand is a fascinating document, but undeniably awkward in presentation." A critic for the WAZ commented that others would not be convinced by the film after the premiere.

== International releases ==
The film was broadcast in:

- the UK and Ireland on Channel 4 on October 29,
- the Netherlands on NPO 3 on October 30, 2016 by VPRO
- Finland on Jim on November 1, 2016.
- Norway on NRK1 (the main Norwegian TV channel) on November 3, 2016
- Sweden on SVT 1 on November 7, 2016
- Denmark on TV2 on November 8, 2016
- Australia on One on November 8, 2016
- Israel on YES VOD, November 2016

== See also ==
- Fahrenheit 11/9
- Trump: The Kremlin Candidate?
- Trumped: Inside the Greatest Political Upset of All Time
