= American Literary Review =

American national biannual literary magazine of poetry, fiction, and nonfiction

American Literary Review A National Journal of Poems and Stories
- Editor-in-chief: Anthony Gabriel
- Categories: Creative writing Poetry; Non-fiction; Fiction
- Frequency: biannual
- Publisher: University of North Texas
- Founder: Jim Lee (1931– July 8, 2024)
- Founded: Spring 1990 (age 36)
- First issue: 1 April 1990
- Country: United States
- Based in: Denton
- Language: English
- Website: americanliteraryreview.com
- ISSN: 1051-5062
- OCLC: 21984784

The American Literary Review is a national biannual literary magazine of poetry, fiction, and nonfiction published by graduate students in creative writing and Literature programs at the University of North Texas since 2022. ALR was founded in 1990 as a print journal by UNT Faculty and transitioned to online digital publication for its fall 2013 issue. Print publications are cataloged under ISSN 1051-5062.

== History ==
=== Founding in 1990s ===
ALR was founded thirty-six years ago, in Spring 1990, by University of North Texas faculty, James Ward Lee (b.1931–d. July 8, 2024) and A.C. Greene of the now dissolved Department of English and the Center for Texas Studies.

Lee was Editor-in-Chief for the first two issues. In the editorial for the first issue, he expressed hope that the name and tagline, "American Literary Review: A National Journal of Poems and Stories, will prove to be neither pretentious nor presumptuous." The founding objective was to showcase a range of genres and styles from emerging and veteran writers and encourage freedom of expression, risk-taking, and experimentation. Lee said that ALR would not publish scholarly articles. ALR's third issue (spring 1991, vol. 2, issue 1) was edited by poet and faculty member Scott Cairns. The first issue received more than 160 submissions.

=== 2000s and 2010s ===
The printed issues, prior to 2013, were typically 120 pages, digest size, perfect-bound with color card cover featuring a photo submission.

In 2004, NewPages characterized ALR as having roughly a 2:1 poetry to fiction ratio, with a casual touch of both traditional and experimental forms.

In 2011, it was receiving 150 to 200 unsolicited manuscripts a month and accepts 12 to 16 per issue. Submissions were reviewed from October 1 to May 1 and published within two years of acceptance. In round one of the referee process, judges, which include graduate students, read submissions and made preliminary selections. Then faculty editors for each category review make final selections for official recognition and publishing. Separate judges for prizes in each category then make their selection. At all stages of the process, the identity of writers is not known by referees.

=== 2020s ===
==== COVID Shutdown ====
In 2020, ALR announced that "due to institutional budget cuts as a result of grappling with the changes brought on by the COVID-19 pandemic, we are forced to go on a temporary hiatus."

==== Graduate Student Revival ====
In Spring 2022, when faculty members were ready to throw in the towel on ALR, the graduate students rallied together to take over running the publication Independently. The Spring 2022 issue was ushered in by Editor-in-Chief Aza Pace and Managing Editor Collene Mayo; it was the first issue release after shuttering down during the Covid pandemic to be published and the first issue that was student-run.

== Annual ALR Awards Contest Winners ==
The ALR awards three annual prizes, for a poem, a short story, and an essay.

Uncategorized

Joshua Poteat

Nonfiction

- Maureen Stanton
- 2008: Karin Forfota Poklen
- 2009: Julie Marie Wade
- 2010: Sabine Heinlein
- 2011: Barbara Cameron
- 2011: Starre Vartan (runner-up)
- 2012: Robert Long Foreman
- 2012: Vernita Hall (runner-up)

Fiction

- Mary L. Tabor (spring 1999)
- Melissa Jeanne Miller (1956–1991)
- 2008: Michael Isaac Shokrian
- 2009: Marylee MacDonald
- 2010: Karen Heuler
- 2010: Nora Khan (runner-up)
- 2010: Emily McLaughlin (runner-up)
- 2011: Marc Dickinson
- 2011: Sean Madigan Hoen (runner-up)
- 2012: Lydia Kann (runner-up)
- 2012: Dustin Parsons

Poetry

- 1990: Sheryl St. Germain
- 1997: Renée Ashley
- 1998: Debora L. Innocenti
- 2001: Sam Witt
- 2007: Jeffrey Levine
- 2008: Roy Bentley
- 2009: Arthur Brown
- 2010: Jude Nutter
- 2011: Joseph Duemer
- 2012: Eileen G'Sell
- 2012: Allan Peterson (runner-up)

== Editors-in-Chief and Staff ==
ALR is a completely graduate student run journal at the University of North Texas.

=== Present Staff ===
- Editor-in-chief- Anthony Gabriel
- Managing Editor- Amber Walters-Molina
- Fiction Editor- Cheyenne LaRoque
- Essays Editor-Christine Van Pay
- Poetry Editor- Meg Lim

=== Former Editors-in-Chief ===
- James Ward Lee, PhD (founding editor)
- Scott Cairns, PhD
- Barbara Rodman, PhD
- William J. Cobb, PhD
- Corey Marks, PhD
- John Tait, PhD
- Mirosalv Penkov
- Jehanne Dubrow, PhD

==== Beginning of Graduate Students Taking Over ====
- Aza Pace, PhD (First Graduate Student Editor)
- James Davis, PhD
- Anna Chotlos, PhD
- Brian Czyzyk, PhD

== Submissions ==
ALR seeks literary fiction, creative nonfiction, and poetry from a variety diverse authors who write to the American experience.

== See also ==
- List of literary magazines

== Publications of the same name ==
- The American Literary Review of Newton, Massachusetts, was a privately owned quarterly literary magazine; 1973 to 1983. Its WorldCat code is OCLC 173746375.
- The American Literary Review of New York City never existed. Rather, it was proposed in 1931 as a review of books. A prospectus for investors was copyrighted and is stored, along with other information, at the Widener Library of Harvard College.
- American Literary Review of Augusta, Maine, was a weekly literary and scientific newspaper founded in 1870 by LaForest Almond Shattuck, M.D. (1846–1930).
