= Cabaret (disambiguation) =

Cabaret is a form of entertainment traditionally performed on stage at a restaurant or nightclub.

Cabaret may also refer to:

== Arts and entertainment ==
=== Music ===
- Cabaret (musical), a Broadway musical, originally produced in 1966
  - "Cabaret" (Cabaret song), the title song from the musical
- "Cabaret" (Justin Timberlake song), 2013
- Cabaret (Das Ich album), the thirteenth album of Das Ich, released in 2006

=== Film ===
- Cabaret (1927 film), a silent crime drama
- Cabaret (1953 film), a Spanish musical
- Cabaret (1972 film), a musical drama adapted from the 1966 Broadway musical
- Cabaret (2019 film), an Indian romantic thriller

=== Television ===
- Cabaret (British TV series), a British variety series (1936–46) on BBC Television
- Cabaret (TV series), a Canadian variety television series (1955)
- "Cabaret" (D:TNG episode), an episode from the first season of Degrassi: The Next Generation

== Other uses ==
- Cabaret, one of the four Châteaux de Lastours in the département of Aude, France
- Cabaret club, a term for host and hostess clubs in Asia
- Cabaret (food), a kind of food including gelatin, aspic, carrot, eggs and peas
- Cabaret, Haiti, a commune in the Ouest department of Haiti
- Pierre Roger de Cabaret, 13th century Occitan military leader in the Albigensian Crusade
- Cabaret service, a tea or coffee service for one or two people
