= Midland Theatre (Newark, Ohio) =

The Midland Theatre is a theatre that was built in 1928 in the Newark Downtown Historic District of Newark, Ohio, United States. Following fifty years of success and renown, the theatre was damaged by a blizzard and closed for more than a decade. It was then purchased and underwent an extensive renovation. Since reopening in 2000, it has been used as a performance venue for live music and other performing arts events. The 1,200-seat theatre provides a multitude of opportunities to view performances by popular artists and participate in various events.

== Golden Era (1928-1978) ==
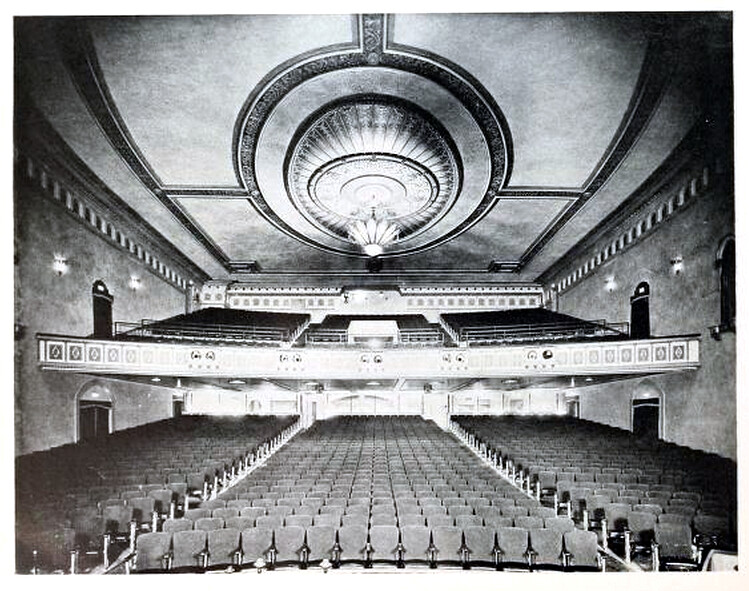
A view into the Midland Theatre's interior in 1929, just one year after its opening in 1928.

The Midland Theatre opened its doors on December 20, 1928. On its opening night, people stood in line for hours (or paid paper boys to hold spots in line for them). Once inside, visitors marveled at the interior, which was inspired by Spanish architecture. Marble columns rose through the foyer, velvet drapes hung from the walls, and lace trimmed the balcony. An art glass chandelier hung over the 1,000-seat theater, where the first visitors were treated to live orchestra music, Vaudeville acts, and silent films. A week later, the theater showed the first sound movie ever to be played in Newark.

Over the next 50 years, a time referred to as the theater's "golden era," the Midland Theatre showed some of Hollywood’s most famous movies, including "Ben Hur," "Gone with the Wind," and "Dr. Zhivago." The film schedule rotated every three days, increasing demand for tickets. Saturdays were especially popular among the area's youth, who enjoyed candy and soda alongside screenings of Tarzan films or Superman cartoons.

During this era, the theater also hosted live entertainment, including the Russian Ballet, Bob Hope, and Jerry Lewis.

The theater housed a 1,188-pipe organ that weighed around 1,000 pounds. The organ took up a lot of space in the theater—the console alone was 7.5 feet in length, 4.5 feet deep, and stood 4.5 feet tall. In 1964, this organ was removed from the theatre after being “organ buff" Scott McKeon made an offer to purchase it.

== Empty years (1978-1992) ==
The Ohio Blizzard of 1978 brought the Golden Era to an end when it struck the Midland Theatre. The blizzard significantly damaged the building, causing flooding in the lower levels, leaks in the ceiling, and severe damage to the boilers. This natural disaster not only destroyed the Midland Theatre but many other businesses as well. It was estimated that around 2,000 homes were destroyed, and Ohio suffered more than one billion dollars in damage across the state. The Ohio Blizzard of 1978 was a devastating blow for the Midland Theatre, leading it to close and sit vacant for 14 years.

== Renovations (1992-2000) ==
In 1992, David Longaberger and the Longaberger Company purchased the historic theater and began renovating it with the goal of bringing back the old prestige of the theater and creating room for a wider range of performances. At the time of the purchase, the Midland Theatre was considered a hazard and an eyesore. Its roof had caved in, allowing water and debris to accumulate in the orchestra pit. After eight years and $8.5 million, the renovations were completed in 2000. The renovations were intended to preserve or duplicate the original opulence of the theater, which can now seat up to 1,200 and is accessible to patrons with disabilities.

David Longaberger passed away a year before the theater's completion, but following its renewal, the property was entrusted to The Newark Midland Theatre Association, a volunteer, non-profit organization. It is also supported by the Ohio Arts Council. Due to the high cost of renovations, the future of the theatre heavily depended upon filling out crowds and donations made to the endowment.

Midland Theatre
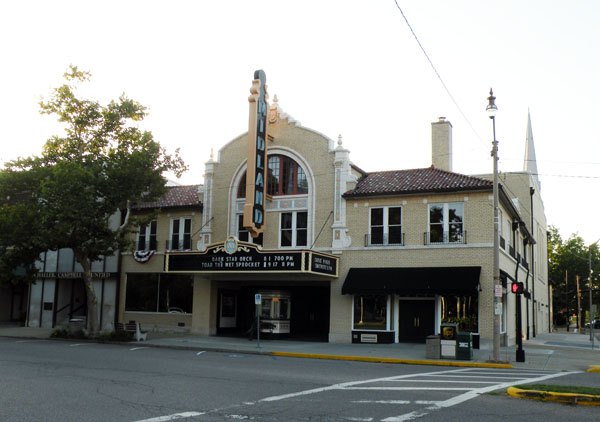
- Interactive map of Midland Theatre
- Location: 36 North Park Place; Newark, Ohio, USA
- Coordinates: 40°3′31.89″N 82°24′5.29″W
- Owner: The Longaberger Company
- Capacity: approx. 1,800 (originally)
- Type: performance hall

Construction
- Built: 1928
- Opened: December 20, 1928; Re-opened 2000
- Renovated: 1992-2000
- Closed: 1978

Website
- http://www.midlandtheatre.org/

== Modern era ==
=== Reopening and current offerings ===
After the successful renovations, the Midland Theatre went beyond movies and intended to attract a variety of performers. The Midland booked Bill Cosby to perform at the reopening and had a sold-out crowd for his two performances in 2002. The theatre offers a variety of shows and performances, and also includes opportunities for gatherings and community-centered events.

The theater's offerings have included a cabaret series, live interactions with performers, replays of well-known shows and cartoons, live bands, and more. Concerts have been held consistently at the theatre with a performance or two each month, with notable performances from Toto, Kansas, and Rick Springfield. The Central Ohio Youth Ballet has performed its version of "The Nutcracker" at the Midland Theatre every year since 2002.

=== Effect of the COVID-19 pandemic ===
The Midland Theatre struggled through the 2020 COVID-19 Pandemic. Many shows and concerts were postponed due to the virus, and the future of the Midland in question. However, multiple fundraising efforts and donations were put towards keeping the theatre in service. The theatre received $200,000 in donations; however, it cost nearly $40,000 a month to keep it up and running. Employees worked long hours with limited pay, and shows had low attendance. It took years for the theatre to fully recover.

In February 2021, the Midland Theatre hosted a murder trial in order to facilitate social distancing. The suspects, Delaney D. Daniels and Brianna K. Lohr, faced multiple counts of unclassified felonies, varying in degree, for the murder of Matthew P. Helman in August 2019.

== Other facts ==
=== Art ===
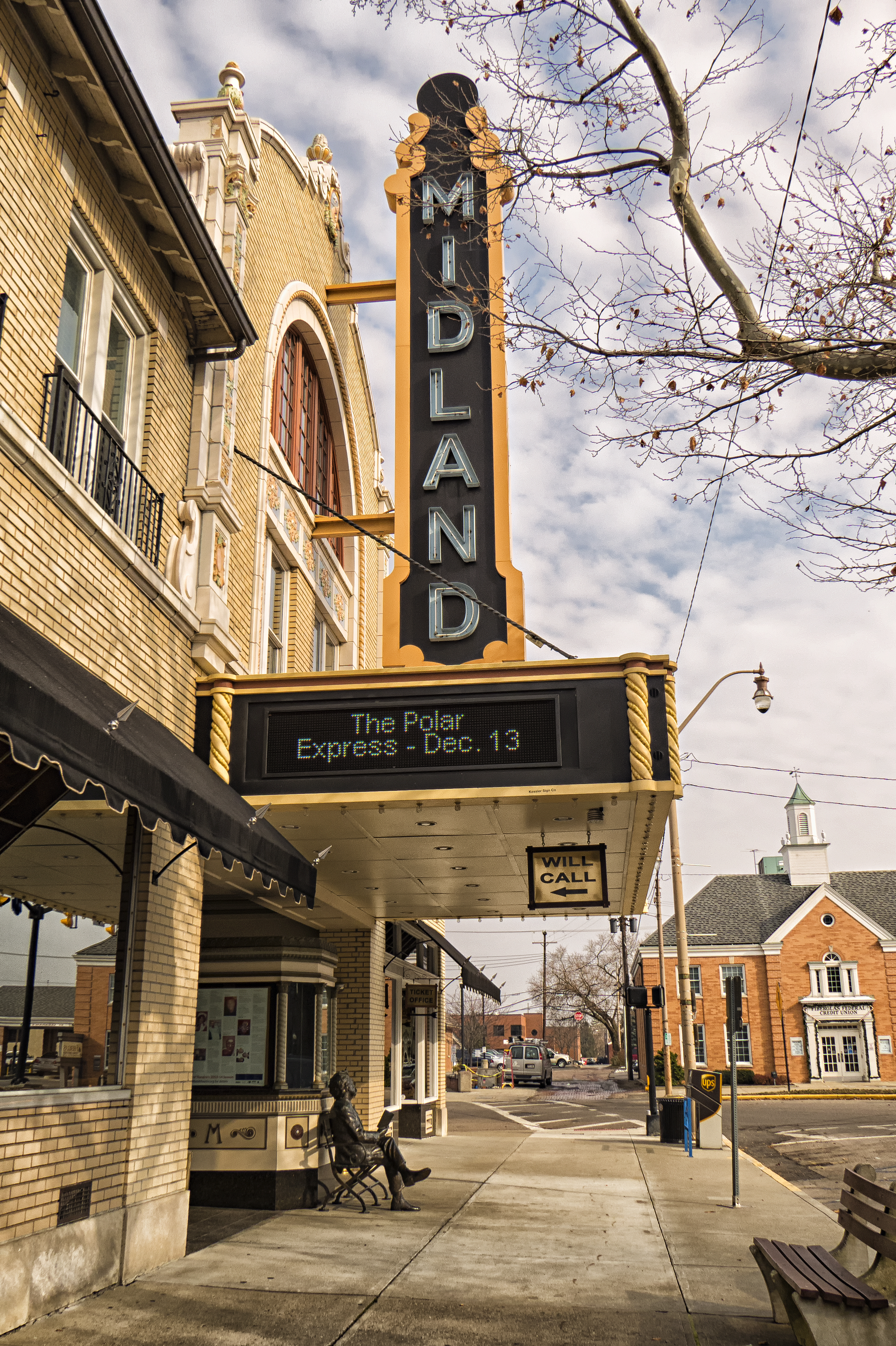
The Midland Theater in Newark, Ohio with a sculpture of Mark Twain in front of the theater entrance.

A statue of author Mark Twain sits outside the Midland Theatre. He can be seen sitting on a bench with one of his most famous novels, Huckleberry Finn, perched on his lap. The statue attracts many tourists and people who pass by enjoy taking pictures and admiring the art.

=== Literature ===
Poet Roy Bentley enshrined Midland Theatre in a prose poem entitled "Saturday Afternoon at the Midland Theatre in Newark, Ohio." The poem described a theater-going experience in 1968, in which the speaker bought one ticket and stayed for three showings of the movie "Bullitt."
