= WALH-LP =

Coordinates: 39°26′43.0″N 83°49′43.4″W

Wilmington, Ohio; United States
- Broadcast area: Wilmington and Clinton County
- Frequency: 106.7 MHz
- Branding: 106.7 WALH

Programming
- Format: Community radio Classic hits
- Affiliations: Mutual Broadcast News

Ownership
- Owner: Robert Hendee; (Hendee Broadcasting Inc.)

History
- First air date: June 8, 2015

Technical information
- Class: L1 Low-power FM
- ERP: 100 watts
- HAAT: 90 feet (27 meters)

Links
- Webcast: Streams directly from homepage of its website
- Website: walhradio.com

WALH-LP was a low-power FM broadcasting station licensed to Wilmington, Ohio, at 106.7 MHz, serving Clinton County. It has ceased on air broadcasts after a snafu with the FCC and subsequent death of the principal owner of the radio station.

WALH aired live local programming and classic hits as "Wilmington's Greatest Hits" from the 1960s, 70s and 80s since its debut which took place on the web from its online stream on Saturday, June 6, 2015 and on the air on June 8, 2015, at 12 noon local time.

Its studios are located at 12 West Main St. in downtown Wilmington which now operates as an online station and is now branded by its website URL.

== Programming ==
- Local news and weather is aired on weekdays in addition to "Mutual Radio News."
- John Cohmer and Dennis Mattingly co-host the weekday morning program Good Morning Wilmington.
- Cohmer also hosts the live Saturday evening program Back To The Blues.

== Call sign history ==
The WALH call sign was used from 1985 to 2013 on the now defunct WNGM in Mountain City, Georgia.
