= Jane Osborn Hannah =

American opera singer

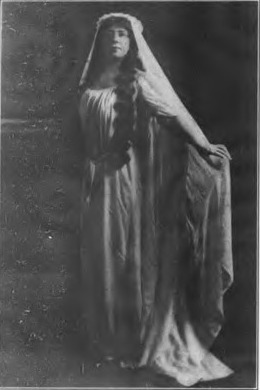
- Jane Osborn Hannah as Sieglinde in Die Walküre
- Born: July 8, 1873; Wilmington
- Died: August 13, 1943 (aged 70); New York City
- Occupation: Opera singer, suffragist

Jane Osborn Hannah (July 8, 1873 – August 13, 1943) was an American opera singer. After retiring, she was active in the women's suffrage movement.

Hannah was born on July 8, 1873 in Wilmington, Ohio, to Parker Barnard and Rebecca Ann Randolph Osborn. A lyric soprano, her teachers included Vittorio Carpi, Johanna Hess-Burr, Mathilde Marchesi, and Rosa Sucher. She debuted in Leipzig in 1904 as Elisabeth in Tannhäuser. She appeared as Eva in Die Meistersinger von Nürnberg at Covent Garden in 1908. In 1910 she debuted at both the Metropolitan Opera as Elizabeth in Tannhäuser and the Chicago Opera Company as Nedda in Pagliacci. Other notable roles included Elsa in Lohengrin, Sieglinde in Die Walküre, Gutrune in Götterdämmerung, Desdemona, the title character in Madama Butterfly, and Barbara in Victor Herbert’s Natoma.

Hannah retired from music in 1914. In retirement, she performed for a number of suffragist conferences and other events. In 1919, she joined a suffragist protest in front of the White House and another at the Metropolitan Opera.

Hannah died on August 13, 1943, in New York City.

== Personal life ==
On November 25, 1907, she married Frank S. Hannah. He died in March 1934.
