= Murphy Theatre =

Theatre in Ohio, USA

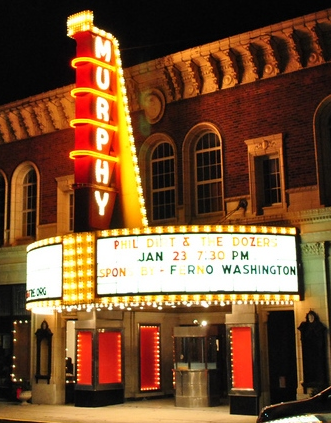
- The Murphy Theatre in 2012
- Interactive map of Murphy Theatre
- Address: 50 W. Main St. Wilmington, Ohio; United States
- Coordinates: 39.4451044°N 83.8294098°W
- Capacity: 682

Construction
- Opened: July 24, 1918
- Reopened: January 17, 1934

Website
- themurphytheatre.org

The Murphy Theatre is a historic theatre located at 50 West Main Street in Wilmington, Ohio.

== History ==
=== Construction ===
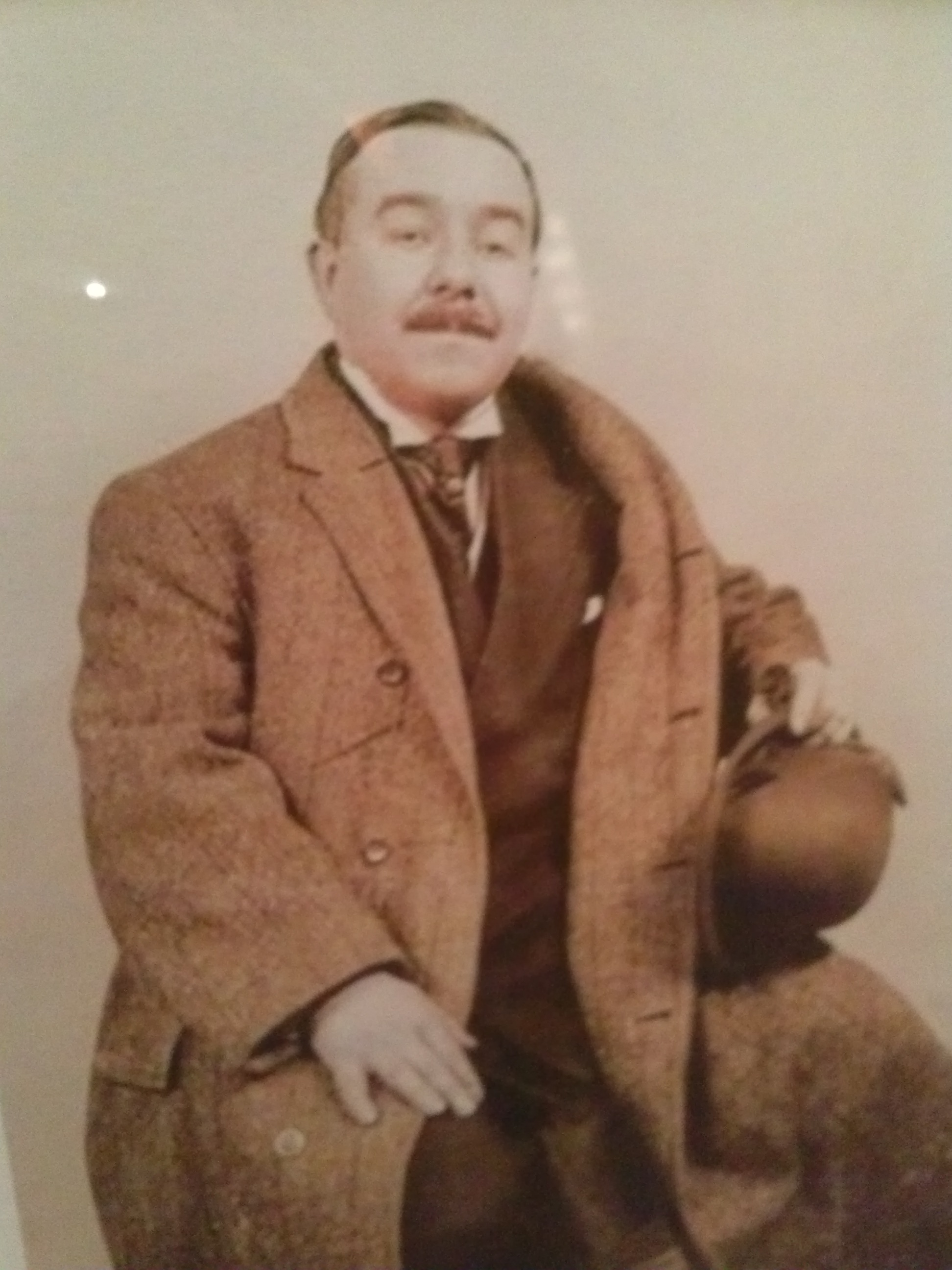
Charles Murphy

Chicago Cubs owner and Wilmington native Charles Murphy financed the construction of the Murphy Theatre. Charles Murphy hired Eveland Construction Company from Cincinnati, Ohio, to build the theatre and construction began in 1916.

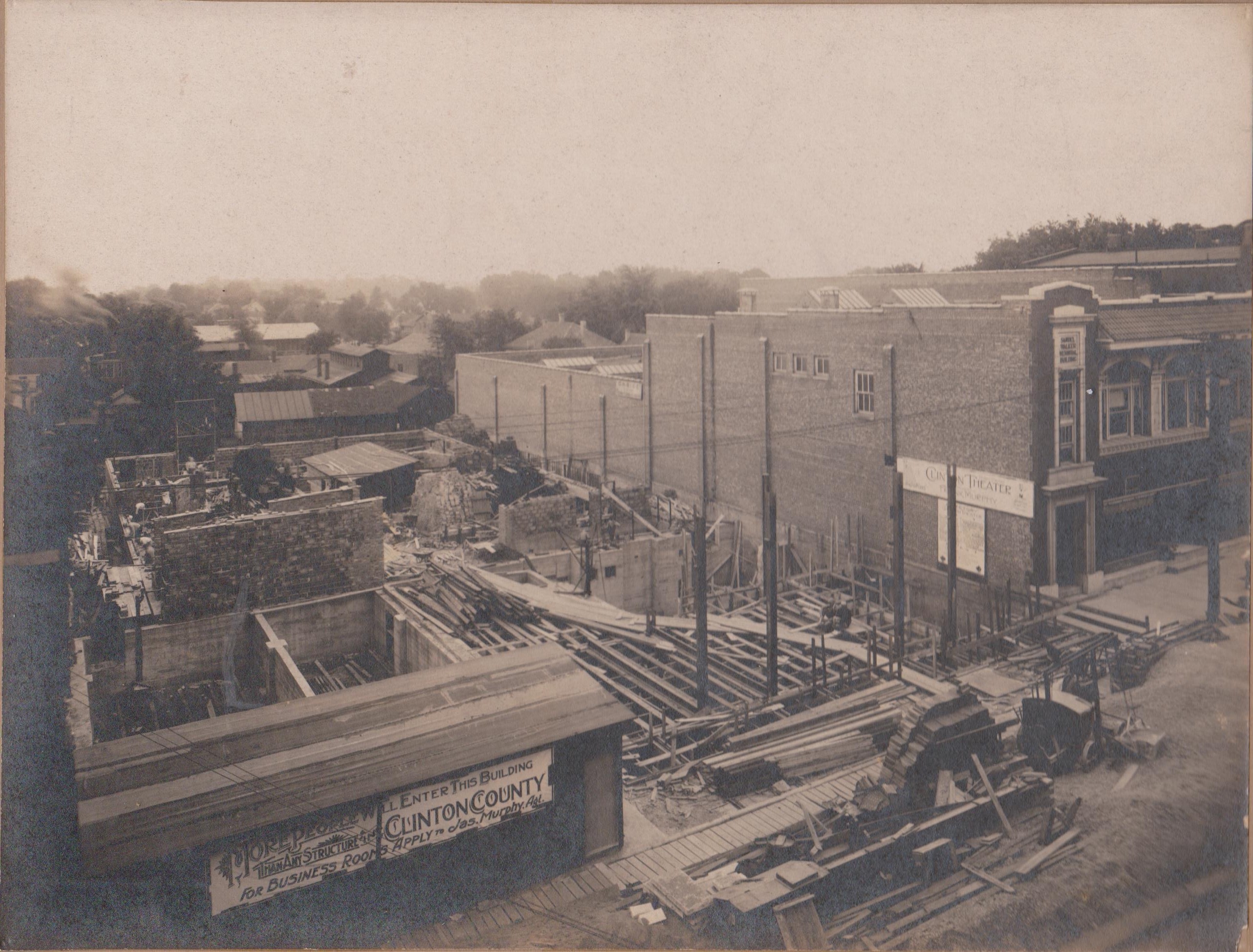
The Murphy Theatre in its early stages of construction.

==== Materials ====
The construction of the Murphy was a massive undertaking. Over 175 cars were used in the construction. The materials used in the construction included: 1 car of metal lathe and tile, 17 cars of hollow tile, 19 cars of solid brick (850,000), 2 cars of terra cotta, 4 cars of lumber, 2 cars of brick-layers cement, 12 cars of cement, 3 cars of lime, 4 cars of plaster, 2 cars of reinforcing steel rebar, 10 cars of structural and ornamental steel, 2 cars of cinders, 1 car of cut stone, 70 cars of sand and gravel, 3 cars of mill work, 4 cars of material for the heating system and 1 car of material for electrical work. It also included the lights, curtains, and ropes. Charles Murphy hired The Mandel Brothers, a prestigious interior decorating firm from Chicago, to decorate the interior. The total cost of the undertaking was in excess of $250,000 (equivalent to $5,351,217 in 2025).

=== Interior ===
==== Proscenium and lobby ====
The theater had a half-barrel foyer ceiling, a carved ornamental plaster with a continuous row of Cupid heads, a lobby decorated with a sunburst chandelier, marble floors, and polished oak doors; and three painted stage curtains with pictures of Betsy Ross, Nathan Hale, and Patrick Henry.

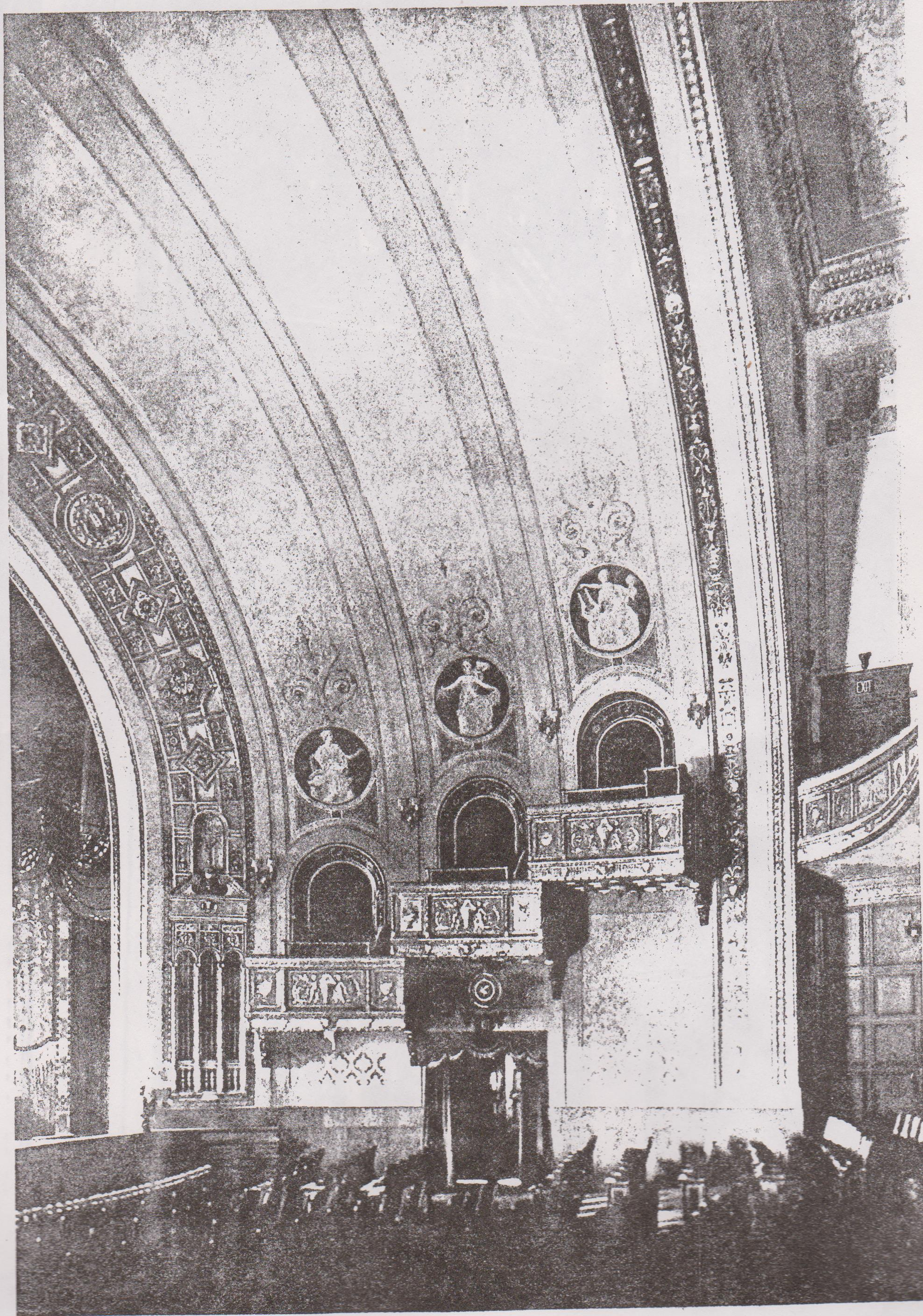
The proscenium arch and the left box seats at the Murphy in 1918

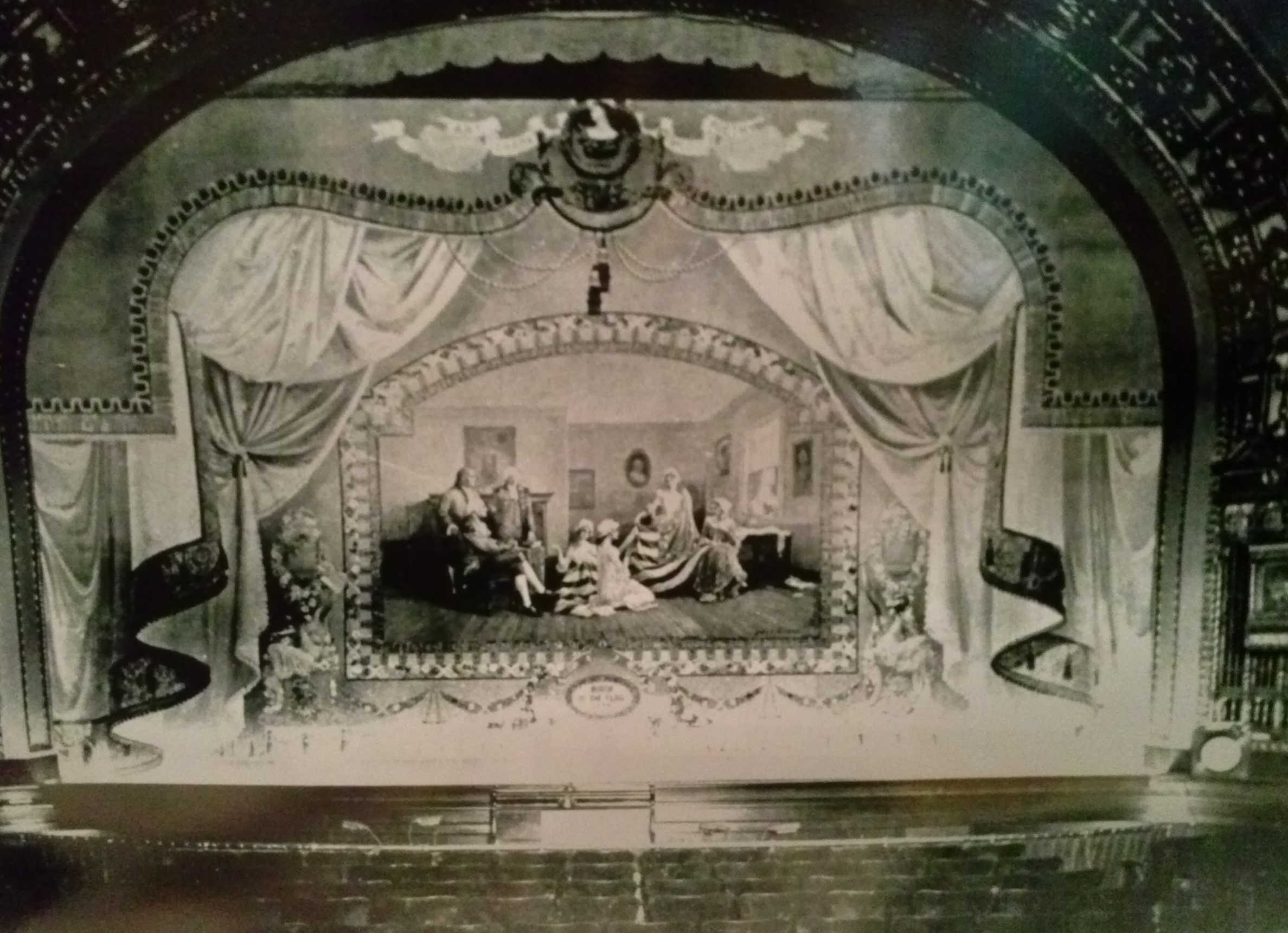
The Betsy Ross curtain of the theatre

==== Electrical and ventilation systems ====
The theatre also had a modern self-regulating air ventilation system and an electrical system that included 15 miles of electrical wiring and a massive switchboard. After inspecting the theatre the state fire marshal remarked, "Until now the Colonial of Dayton was the finest theater in Ohio, but it now must take second place to this fine amusement palace. It is a revelation to me. Why there is not enough to burn here to start a grate".

=== Opening day ===
The theater officially opened on July 24, 1918. Famous acts such as Say! Young Fellow starring Douglas Fairbanks and Good Night, Nurse! starring Fatty Arbuckle were performed on the opening day. 2,000 seats sold for 15 cents each and 1,000 seats sold for 10 cents each. Over 3,000 people filled the building. Ticket sales totaled $1,216.72. Sometime after the grand opening Charles Murphy had this to say about the opening: "That opening handed me the greatest surprise and delight of my life. Where did all the people come from? I have seen many large crowds - some of them at the world's series netting me thousands of dollars—but none gave me the real pleasure I got Wednesday. No man's vocabulary can do it justice."

=== Notable events ===
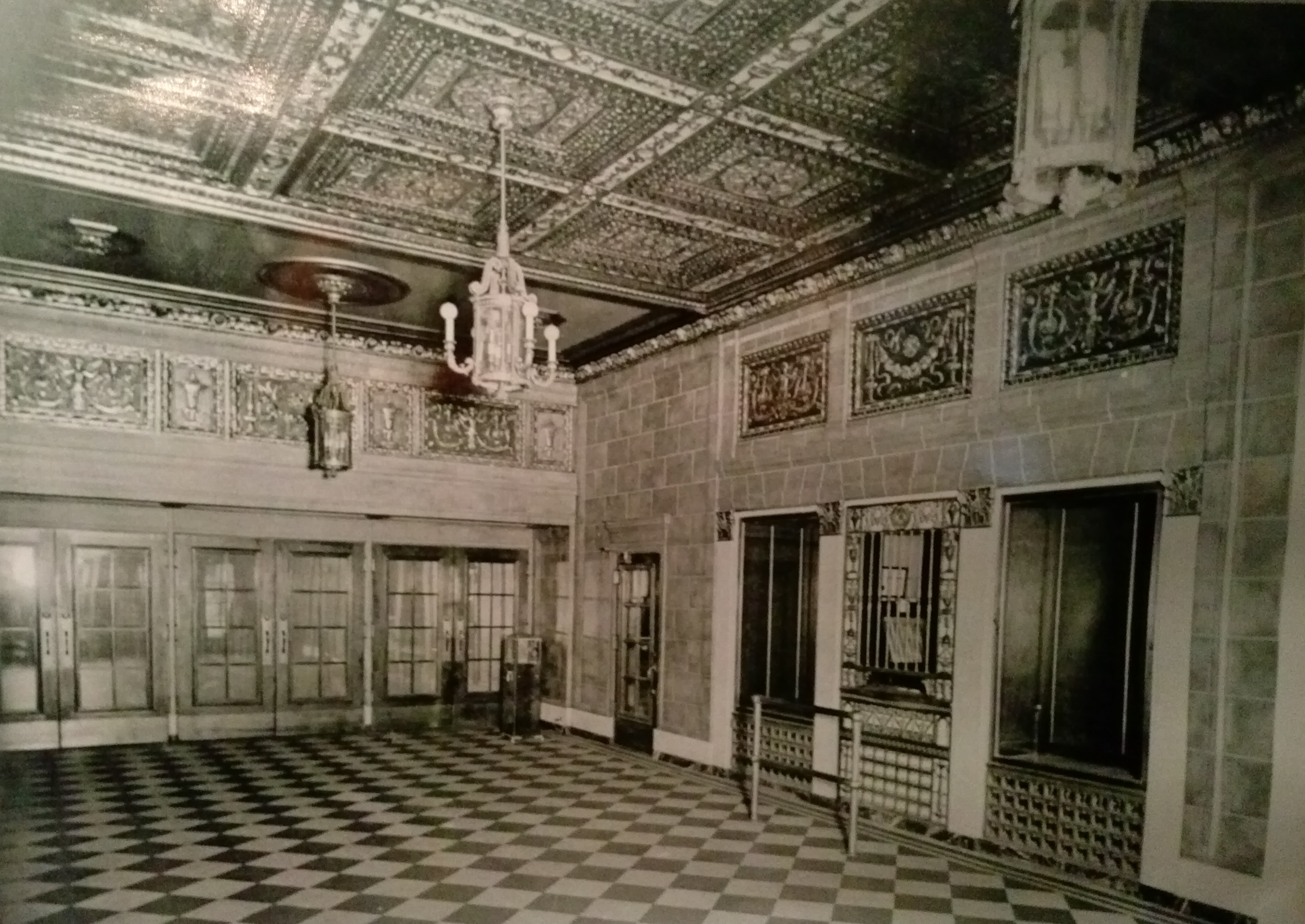
The lobby of the Murphy Theatre in 1918

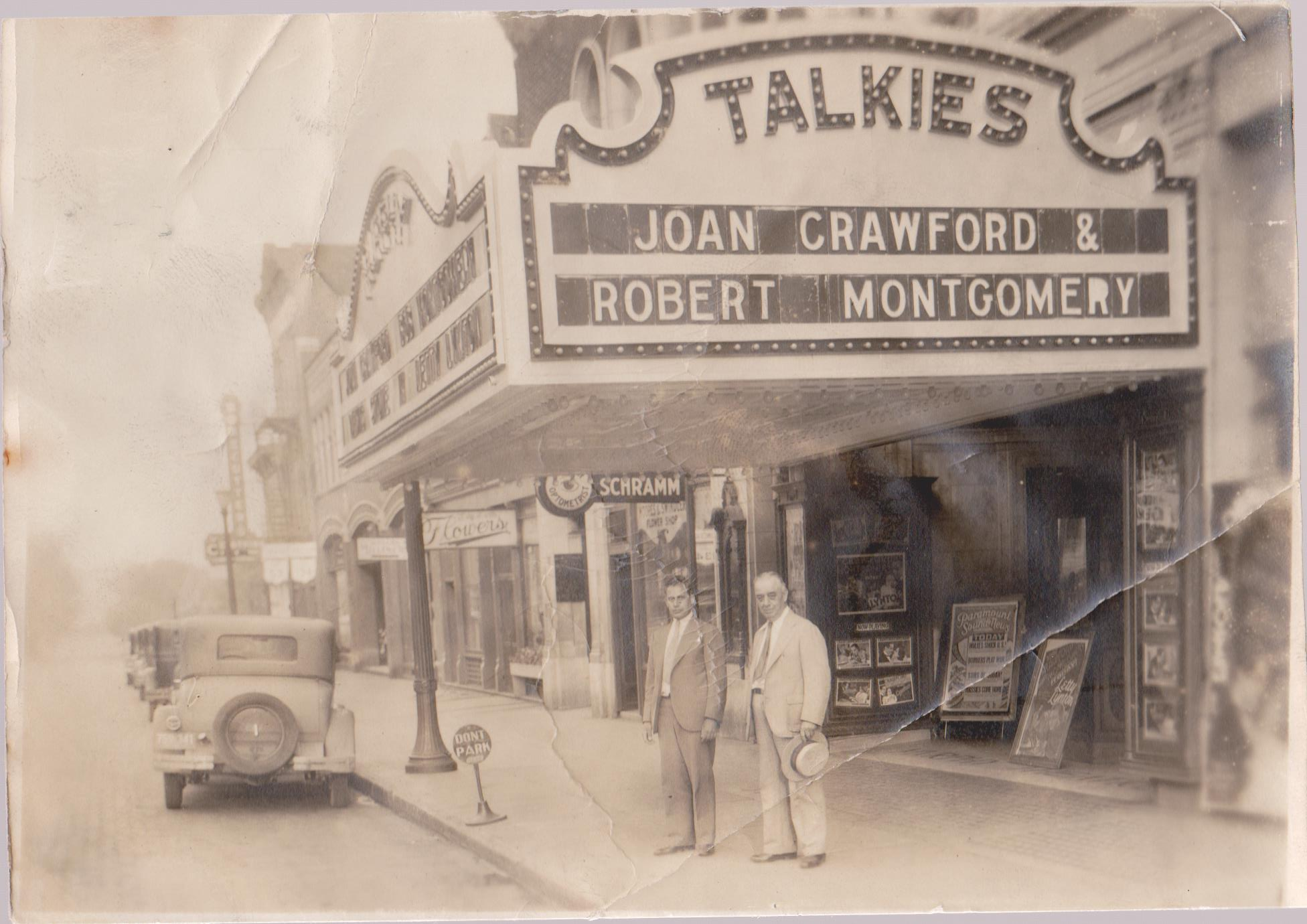
Charles Murphy (on the right) at the Murphy Theatre

==== Fire ====
On January 15, 1934, a fire caused considerable damage to the theatre. The fire is believed to have started from a burning cigarette thrust against the motion picture screen. The fires started at the lower right corner of the picture screen and spread rapidly to the scenery. The people at the theatre were unaware that there was a fire. The asbestos curtain was dropped hurriedly and kept the flames back stage. Firemen battled the flames for more than an hour. The Betsy Ross scenery, two complete scenery sets and 56 line sets were destroyed. Sound equipment and screens were destroyed at a cost of estimated at $5,000. Insurance covered the cost of the damages.

On January 17, 1934, the Murphy Theatre re-opened. New 'talkies' equipment and a new and larger picture screen were installed.

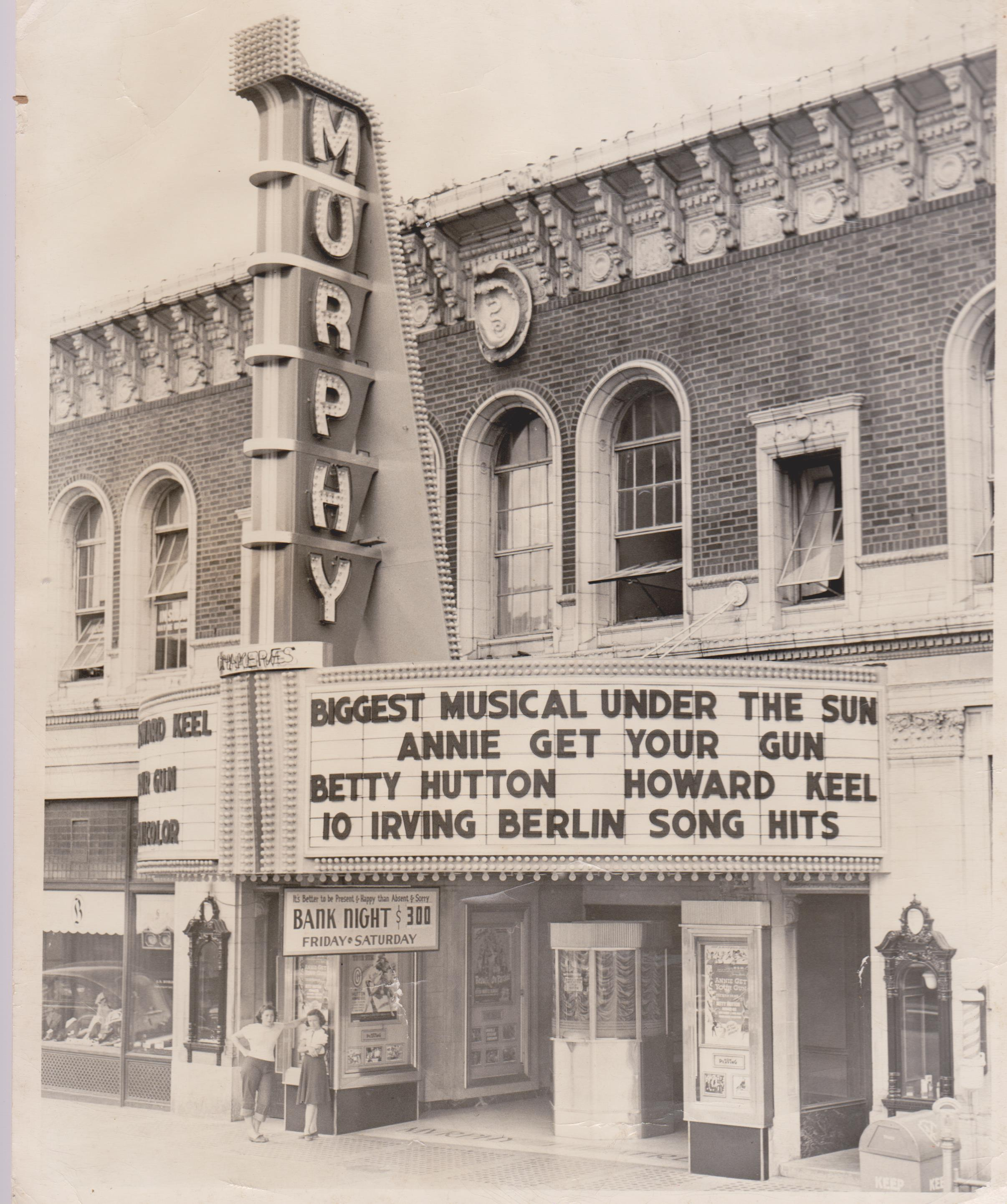
The Murphy Theatre in 1950

Notably, local filmmaker Kroger Babb's controversial 1945 exploitation film Mom and Dad was shown several times in the Murphy Theatre, featuring live appearances by "hygiene commentator" Elliott Forbes, played by various Wilmington residents. Mom and Dad was added to the National Film Registry in 2005, due to its distinction as "[t]he most successful sex-hygiene exploitation film of all time, a low budget but relentlessly promoted, socially significant film, which finished as the third highest grossing film during the 1940s."

== Today ==
Today the Murphy Theatre is a non-profit theatre and serves as a community center. The theatre has 682 seats. On September 18, 1999, the Murphy Theatre hosted the wedding of actors John Ritter and Amy Yasbeck.

The Murphy has been host to nationally acclaimed acts such as the Von Trapp Children. In 2010, the Murphy hosted conservative commentator Glenn Beck and broadcasts of his radio and television programs. Every year around Christmas time, the theater holds a show called The Murphy Christmas Show, showcasing such acts as dance troupes, barbershop quartets, children's choirs, and the Wilmingtones from Wilmington High School.

== In pop culture ==
The theater can be seen in the films Lost in Yonkers and Michael Moore in TrumpLand. Also is a significant location in the plot of Nutcrackers (2024), the family comedy-drama, starring Ben Stiller.
