= Charles Murphy (baseball owner) =

American journalist (1868–1931)

- Portrait of Murphy
- Born: Charles Webb Murphy; January 22, 1868; Wilmington, Ohio, U.S.
- Died: October 16, 1931 (aged 63); Chicago, Illinois, U.S.
- Occupation: American baseball team owner

Charles Webb Murphy (January 22, 1868 – October 16, 1931) was the owner of the Chicago Cubs of the National League from 1906 through 1913.

== Overview ==
Originally a sportswriter for The Cincinnati Enquirer and the Cincinnati Times-Star, Murphy joined the New York Giants front office in 1905. After the 1905 season, Murphy purchased the Cubs from Jim Hart, in a bid financed by a loan from Charles Phelps Taft, owner of the Enquirer. Murphy repaid the loan in full with the profits from the 1906 season.

It was under Murphy's ownership that the Cubs won the franchise's only two World Series titles before 2016, in 1907 and 1908. After several years as Cubs owner, Murphy became a disliked figure amongst other owners in the National League, the press, and his players. He sold the Cubs to Charles Phelps Taft after the 1913 season.

Murphy also held a 50 percent stake in the Baker Bowl, the former home field of the Philadelphia Phillies, which was sold to him by former Phillies owner Horace Fogel in 1912.

After leaving baseball, Murphy returned to Wilmington, Ohio and financed the construction of the Murphy Theatre.

Murphy died in Chicago, Illinois, at age 63.
