= Wilmington, Ohio =

- City
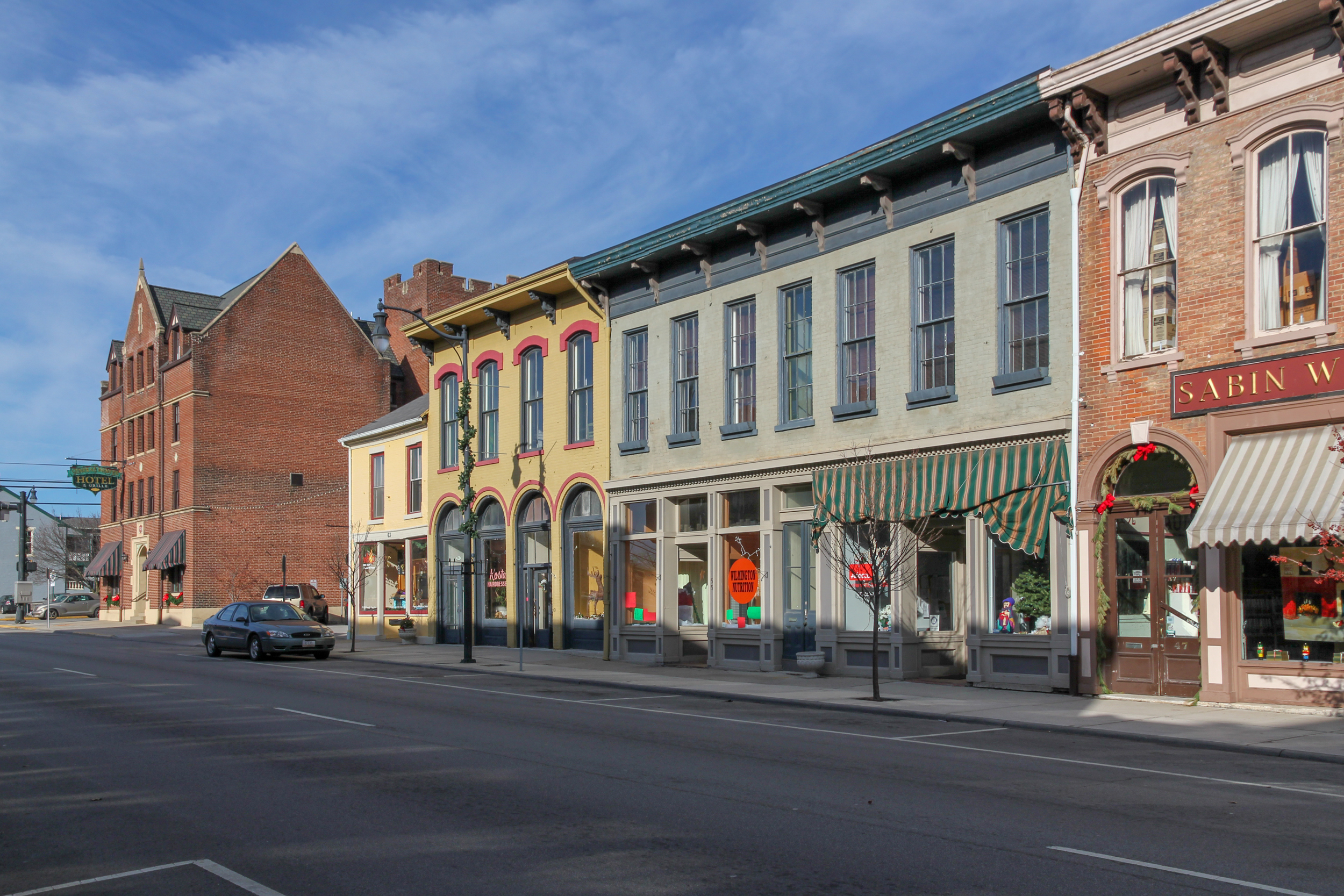
- Wilmington Commercial Historic District
- Motto: "A Worthy Heritage, A Winning Future"
- Interactive map of Wilmington, Ohio
- Location within Ohio Location within the United States
- Coordinates: 39°26′10″N 83°48′50″W
- Country: United States
- State: Ohio
- County: Clinton
- Established: 1810

Government
  - Mayor: Pat Haley (R)

Area
  - Total: 13.09 sq mi (33.91 km^{2})
  - Land: 12.94 sq mi (33.52 km^{2})
  - Water: 0.15 sq mi (0.39 km^{2})
- Elevation: 1,014 ft (309 m)

Population (2020)
  - Total: 12,664
  - Density: 978/sq mi (377.8/km^{2})
- Time zone: UTC-5 (Eastern (EST))
  - Summer (DST): UTC-4 (EDT)
- ZIP code: 45177
- Area codes: 937, 326
- FIPS code: 39-85792
- GNIS feature ID: 2397327
- Website: wilmingtonohio.gov

Wilmington is a city in Clinton County, Ohio, United States, and its county seat. Its population was 12,664 at the 2020 census. It is the principal city of the Wilmington micropolitan area, which includes all of Clinton County and is part of the greater Cincinnati–Wilmington–Maysville combined statistical area.

Home to Wilmington College, founded in 1870 by the Society of Friends, the city and the surrounding area include more than a dozen Quaker meeting houses. The city features a weather forecast office of the National Weather Service, which serves all of Southwestern Ohio and portions of Kentucky and Indiana.

== History ==
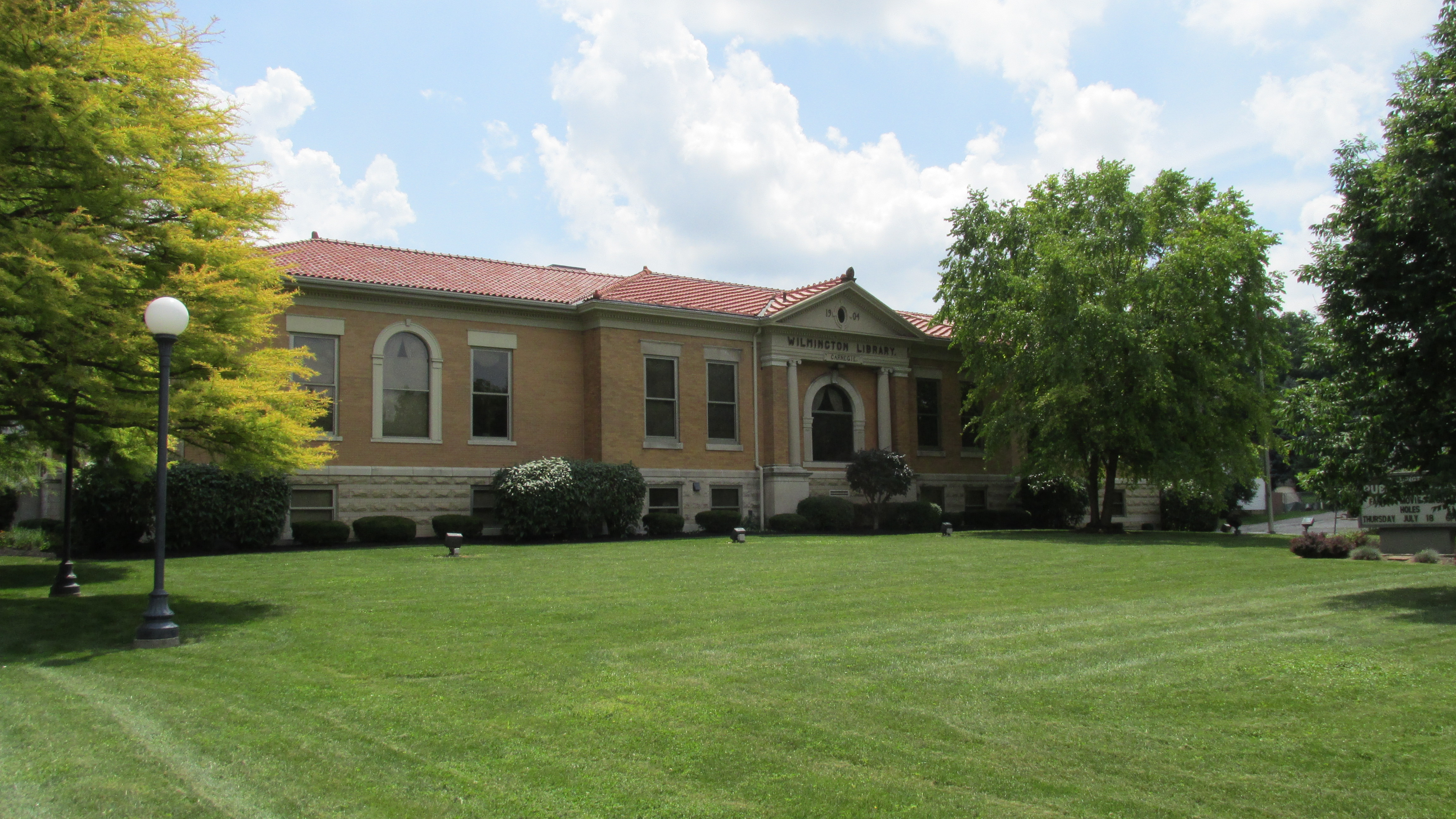
Wilmington Carnegie Public Library

The town of Clinton was founded in 1810 as seat of the newly formed Clinton County; the name was changed to Wilmington in 1811. The village was incorporated in 1828.

In 1833, Wilmington contained a brick courthouse, a jail, 14 stores, two taverns, two groceries, four churches, and 100 residential houses.

Wilmington was featured in Time on December 8, 1997, as a small town that is attractive to suburban families. The city was also showcased in a 1995 publication titled The 100 Best Small Towns in America.

== Geography ==
According to the United States Census Bureau, the city has a total area of 10.93 square miles (28.31 km^{2}), of which 0.04 square miles (0.10 km^{2}) is covered by water.

=== Climate ===
Climate data for Wilmington, Ohio (1991–2020 normals, extremes 1917–present)
Month	Jan	Feb	Mar	Apr	May	Jun	Jul	Aug	Sep	Oct	Nov	Dec	Year
Record high °F (°C)	74 (23)	76 (24)	88 (31)	92 (33)	97 (36)	104 (40)	111 (44)	105 (41)	104 (40)	92 (33)	82 (28)	73 (23)	111 (44)
Mean daily maximum °F (°C)	36.8 (2.7)	40.7 (4.8)	50.7 (10.4)	63.6 (17.6)	72.9 (22.7)	81.5 (27.5)	84.1 (28.9)	82.9 (28.3)	77.3 (25.2)	65.1 (18.4)	52.0 (11.1)	41.3 (5.2)	62.4 (16.9)
Daily mean °F (°C)	29.1 (−1.6)	32.3 (0.2)	41.2 (5.1)	52.7 (11.5)	62.5 (16.9)	70.9 (21.6)	73.6 (23.1)	72.0 (22.2)	65.6 (18.7)	54.5 (12.5)	42.9 (6.1)	34.0 (1.1)	52.6 (11.4)
Mean daily minimum °F (°C)	21.4 (−5.9)	23.7 (−4.6)	31.7 (−0.2)	41.7 (5.4)	52.2 (11.2)	60.3 (15.7)	63.2 (17.3)	61.1 (16.2)	54.0 (12.2)	43.8 (6.6)	33.8 (1.0)	26.8 (−2.9)	42.8 (6.0)
Record low °F (°C)	−25 (−32)	−20 (−29)	−10 (−23)	10 (−12)	24 (−4)	36 (2)	40 (4)	37 (3)	26 (−3)	12 (−11)	−6 (−21)	−24 (−31)	−25 (−32)
Average precipitation inches (mm)	2.91 (74)	2.73 (69)	3.63 (92)	4.46 (113)	4.63 (118)	4.64 (118)	3.88 (99)	3.16 (80)	2.93 (74)	3.20 (81)	3.05 (77)	3.18 (81)	42.40 (1,077)
Average precipitation days (≥ 0.01 in)	13.3	11.6	12.2	13.4	14.1	12.5	11.7	10.5	10.6	11.1	10.6	12.9	144.5
Source: NOAA

== Demographics ==
Historical population
Census	Pop.	Note	%±
1820	235		—
1830	616		162.1%
1840	784		27.3%
1850	1,238		57.9%
1860	915		−26.1%
1870	2,023		121.1%
1880	2,745		35.7%
1890	3,079		12.2%
1900	3,613		17.3%
1910	4,491		24.3%
1920	5,037		12.2%
1930	5,332		5.9%
1940	5,971		12.0%
1950	7,387		23.7%
1960	8,915		20.7%
1970	10,051		12.7%
1980	10,442		3.9%
1990	11,199		7.2%
2000	11,921		6.4%
2010	12,520		5.0%
2020	12,664		1.2%
U.S. Decennial Census

=== 2020 census ===
As of the 2020 census, Wilmington had a population of 12,664. The median age was 36.4 years; 21.4% of residents were under 18 and 18.0% were 65 age or older. For every 100 females, there were 88.5 males, and for every 100 females 18 and over, there were 86.5 males.

About 98.0% of residents lived in urban areas, while 2.0% lived in rural areas.

Of the 5,129 households in Wilmington, 27.8% had children under 18 living in them, 34.2% were married-couple households, 21.9% were households with a male householder and no spouse or partner present, and 35.6% were households with a female householder and no spouse or partner present. About 37.9% of all households were made up of individuals, and 15.9% had someone living alone who was 65 or older.

The city had 5,690 housing units, of which 9.9% were vacant. The homeowner vacancy rate was 2.9% and the rental vacancy rate was 8.6%.

Racial composition as of the 2020 census
Race	Number	Percent
White	10,807	85.3%
Black or African American	685	5.4%
American Indian and Alaska Native	45	0.4%
Asian	128	1.0%
Some other race	219	1.7%
Two or more races	779	6.2%
Hispanic or Latino (of any race)	355	2.8%

=== 2010 census ===
As of the census of 2010, 12,520 people, 5,072 households, and 2,995 families resided in the city. The population density was 1,149.7 inhabitants per square mile (443.9/km^{2}). The 5,827 housing units had an average density of 535.1 per square mile (206.6/km^{2}). The racial makeup of the city was 88.3% White, 6.1% African American, 0.2% Native American, 0.8% Asian, 0.1% Pacific Islander, 0.9% from other races, and 3.5% from two or more races. Hispanics or Latinos of any race were 2.6% of the population.

Of the 5,072 households, 31.6% had children under 18 living with them, 37.8% were married couples living together, 16.3% had a female householder with no husband present, 4.9% had a male householder with no wife present, and 41.0% were not families. About 35.3% of all households were made up of individuals, and 15% had someone living alone who was 65 or older. The average household size was 2.27, and the average family size was 2.92.

The median age in the city was 33.7 years; The age distribution was 23.5% under 18; 14.8% from 18 to 24; 24.2% from 25 to 44; 23% from 45 to 64; and 14.5% were 65 or older. The gender makeup of the city was 46.7% male and 53.3% female.

=== 2000 census ===
As of the census of 2000, 11,921 people, 4,867 households, and 2,929 families were residing in the city. The population density was 1,599.9 inhabitants per square mile (617.7/km^{2}). The 5,284 housing units had an average density of 709.2 per square mile (273.8/km^{2}). The racial makeup of the city was 90.66% White, 6.72% African American, 0.23% Native American, 0.65% Asian, 0.26% from other races, and 1.49% from two or more races. Hispanics or Latinos of any race were 0.84% of the population.

Of the 4,867 households, 30.1% had children under 18 living with them, 42.7% were married couples living together, 13.7% had a female householder with no husband present, and 39.8% were not families; 33.7% of all households were made up of individuals, and 13.4% had someone living alone who was 65 or older. The average household size was 2.28, and the average family size was 2.92.

In the city, the age distribution was 23.7% under 18, 15.8% from 18 to 24, 27.3% from 25 to 44, 19.2% from 45 to 64, and 14.1% who were 65 or older. The median age was 32 years. For every 100 females, there were 89.9 males. For every 100 females 18 and over, there were 84.4 males.

The median income in the city for a household was $34,880 and for a family was $43,619. Males had a median income of $31,645 versus $22,627 for females. The per capita income for the city was $17,346. About 8.9% of families and 11.7% of the population were below the poverty line, including 14.6% of those under 18 and 10.5% of those 65 or over.

== Economy ==
In the early 1950s, the city became home to a number of U.S. Department of Defense facilities, most notably the Clinton County Air Force Base. Following its closure in 1971, the economy of the city hovered in recession for more than a decade. After a number of small attempts to reuse the abandoned air force base, Midwest Air Charter purchased the facility in 1978 for $850,000, a fraction of the estimated $100 million spent to construct it. Midwest was purchased in 1980 by Airborne Freight Corporation (ABF) and was renamed Airborne Express. During the next 24 years, ABF invested more than $250 million to build a hub for its national delivery network, including new sort centers, a 9,000-foot (2,700 m) runway, aircraft hangars, machine shops, flight simulators, a state-of-the-art control tower, and a modern administration building to accommodate an estimated 6,000 employees and its fleet of 125 DC-8, DC-9, and Boeing 767 aircraft.

In 2003, ABF was sold to DHL and its airline, by then known as ABX Air, was spun out of the company. ABX Air is a contract freight-forwarding business whose primary customer is DHL, one of the world's largest international shipping firms. ABX's parent company, Air Transport Services Group, is based in Wilmington. Owned by the Deutsche Post WorldNet, a German holding company, DHL consolidated its US flight and sorting hub operations in Wilmington in 2005. Restructuring in May 2008 resulted in 8000 layoffs, and six months later, the Wilmington hub was closed, resulting in another 8000 layoffs.

The facility closed in July 2009, and DHL moved to a much smaller sorting operation at the Cincinnati-Northern Kentucky International Airport. Wilmington's airport hosts a comparatively smaller Maintenance Repair and Overhaul venture, along with Airborne Maintenance and Engineering Services, employing several hundred employees under the auspices of the ABX Air parent company, Air Transport Services Group.

On July 16, 2009, the Wilmington City Council voted unanimously to establish Wilmington as a "Green Enterprise Zone". The legislation was to facilitate green economic development by creating financial incentives for the creation of green-collar jobs. The city council passed the measure in response to an economic grassroots movement initiated in October 2008 by two Wilmington High School graduates, Mark Rembert and Taylor Stuckert, aided by Pure Blue Energy, LLC, a consulting firm out of North Carolina. Wilmington is the first city in the United States to pass such a law.

The AZEK Company has its main manufacturing plant in Wilmington and produces composite decking and railing systems under the TimberTech and AZEK brands. In 2018, with the Green Enterprise Zone initiative in place, the AZEK Company opened a state-of-the-art polyethylene recycling plant in Wilmington Airpark, which recycles postindustrial and postconsumer polyethylene and PVC to make it into raw material for TimberTech decking.

Wilmington is also home to CMH Regional Health System, a regional health provider. From its base of operations at Clinton Memorial Hospital, the nonprofit corporation has established health clinics in almost a dozen satellite locations in Southwestern Ohio. In 2007, CMH opened the Foster J. Boyd, MD, Regional Cancer Center in Wilmington, providing cancer-treatment services for patients throughout Southwest Ohio. The hospital in Wilmington has 95 staffed beds and employed nearly 1000 people as of fiscal year 2006. The hospital also offers a six-bed intensive care unit, a dedicated emergency room (with an average of over 30,000 visits from 2004–2006), an obstetrics unit (with 725 births in FY 2006), surgical services (6,356 surgical procedures and 1,184 endoscopies FY 2006), medical-telemetry care, medical-surgical and pediatric care, physical rehabilitation, nuclear medicine and CT services, and a sleep-study center, among other various professional services at the hospital. RegionalCare Hospital Partners of Brentwood, Tennessee, purchased Clinton Memorial Hospital on November 30, 2010. The total sale price after adjustments was $82,137,477.

In addition to air freight and medical services, the city of Wilmington also competes in the truck freight industry, serving as corporate home to R+L Carriers, a trucking and shipping company located off of the intersection between U.S. 68 and I-71 north of Wilmington.

== Arts and culture ==
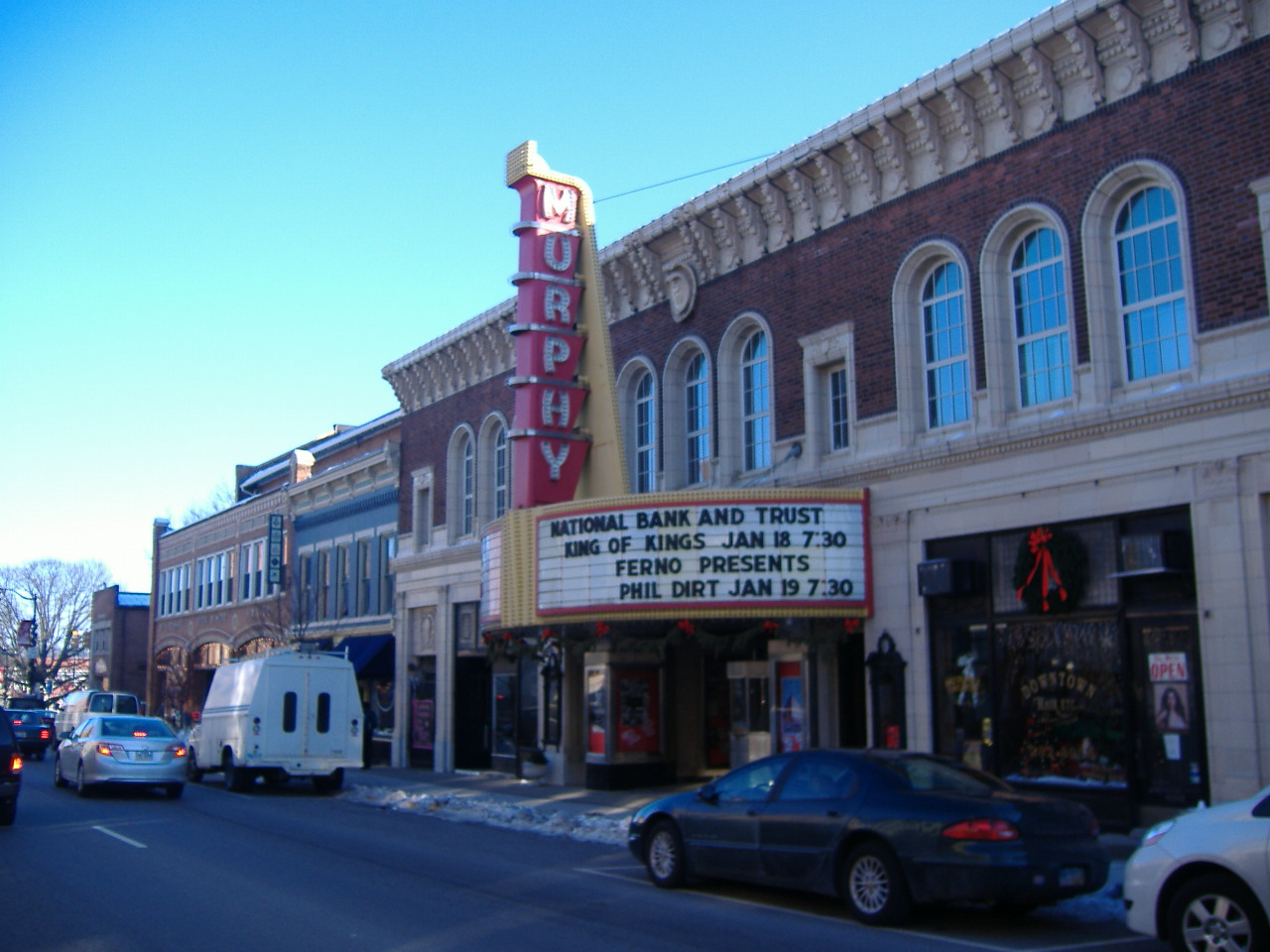
Murphy Theatre first opened in 1918

Wilmington is within a one-hour driving distance to Dayton, Cincinnati, and Columbus. In the mid-1990s, the annual Banana Split Festival was started to commemorate the town's alleged creation of the famous treat in Wilmington in 1907. In addition each year, the city hosts the Clinton County Corn Festival, which pays homage to the agricultural tradition of the county. In 2007, a new festival, the Hometown Holidazzle, was started, taking place in the late fall. Aside from the annual events, Wilmington played host to a festival each year that a new Harry Potter book was released. Thousands gathered in downtown Wilmington at the Books 'N' More bookstore and surrounding businesses to celebrate each release.

Located in the downtown business district is the historic Murphy Theatre, which can be seen in the film Lost In Yonkers, part of which was filmed in the city in the early 1990s. It is also the setting of Michael Moore's 2016 documentary film, Michael Moore in TrumpLand.

The Murphy Theater stages productions throughout the year from various acts and ensembles, as well as staging musicals and plays from neighboring school districts in the county. More recently, the Murphy is home to free screenings of classic movies, sponsored by a community group. The Murphy Theatre hosted the marriage of actor John Ritter and wife Amy Yasbeck on September 18, 1999, with the marquee simply stating, "Congratulations John and Amy". Nearby in downtown Wilmington is the historic General Denver Hotel, which is named in honor of General James W. Denver, who is buried in Wilmington and was founder of the city of Denver, Colorado.

=== Sports ===
Wilmington is home to Wilmington College, a member of the Ohio Athletic Conference and participant in NCAA Division III sports. In 2004, the Wilmington College women's basketball team won the NCAA Women's Division III Basketball Championship, the most prestigious national title won by a Wilmington sport team. In the summer of 2008, the Quakers football home, Williams Stadium, underwent a major renovation, with new stadium lights and artificial playing field installed.

== Education ==
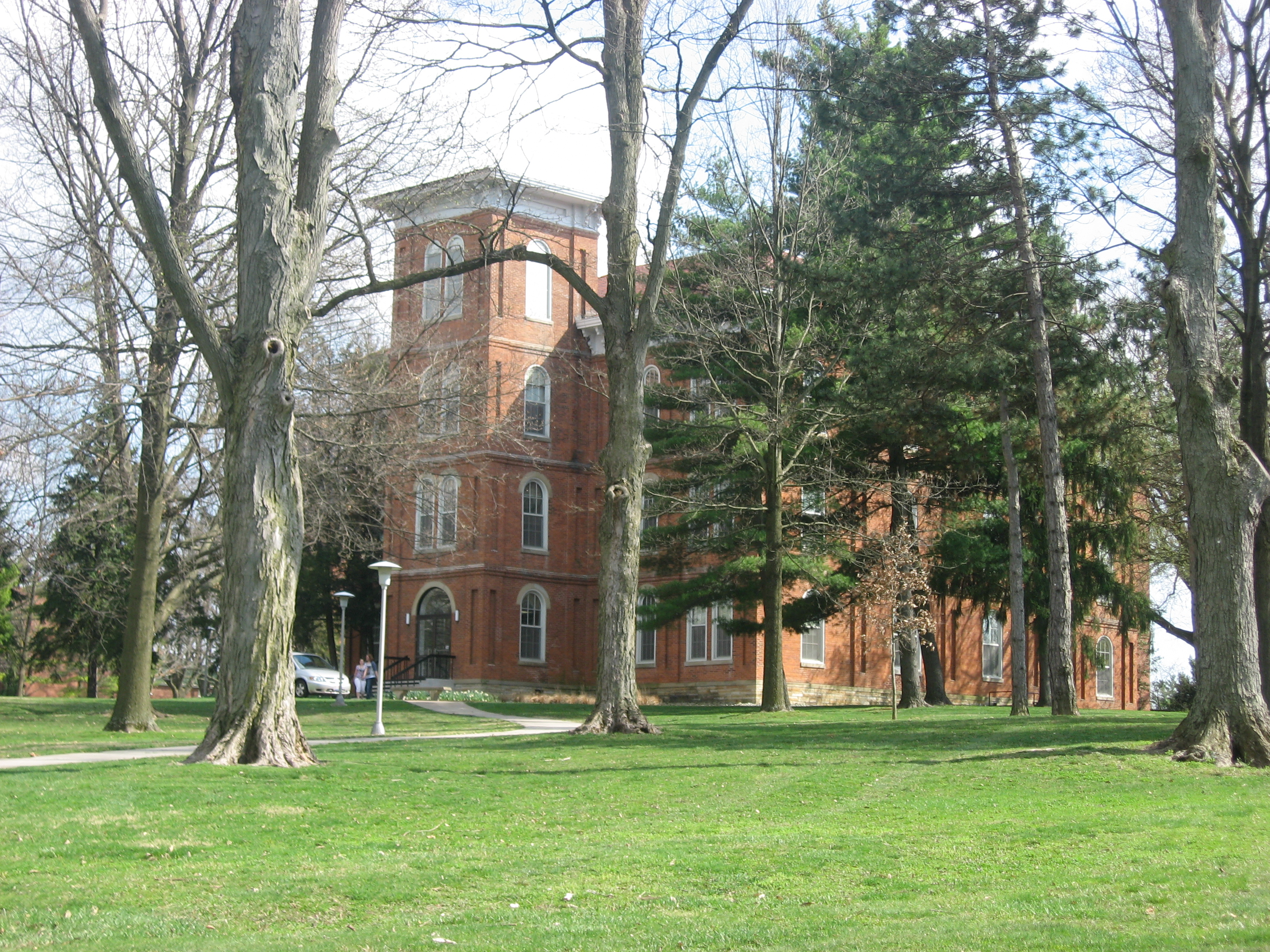
College Hall, the main building at Wilmington College

The Wilmington City Schools system includes Roy E. Holmes Elementary, Denver Place Elementary, East End Elementary (which was closed as of the end of the 2023-2024 school year), Rodger O. Borror Middle School (formerly known as Wilmington Middle School), and Wilmington High School. The school district includes 166 square miles (430 km^{2}), the largest in the county. ACT scores are above both the state and national averages, and over three-quarters of students go on to attend college, which is far above the state average of 40%, although both are the lowest among the four high schools within the county.

In addition, a college campus is located in the city. Wilmington College, a Quaker-established college that dates from the 19th century, focuses on liberal arts education with themes of global peace and understanding and majors in agriculture, education, athletic training, and small-business administration.

The city is served by one of two branches of the Wilmington Public Library system.

== Media ==
The city and surrounding areas are served by a daily newspaper published in Wilmington, the News Journal, and by two radio stations.

- WALH-LP 106.7 FM (local programming, information and oldies music)
- WKFI 1090 AM (simulcast of WBZI)

== Transportation ==
The city lies about 35 miles southeast of Dayton, 50 miles northeast of Cincinnati, and 60 miles southwest of Columbus at the nexus of several routes that traverse Southwest Ohio. Wilmington is served by US Route 68, US Route 22/State Route 3, State Route 73, State Route 134, and State Route 730. The city does not have direct interstate access, but is connected to Interstate 71 via US Route 68 and State Route 73.

Airborne Airpark serves as the city's airport. The airport sees substantial domestic and international cargo service, but is not currently served by any commercial passenger services.

Freight railroad service is provided by the Indiana and Ohio Railway on a line owned by CSX Transportation between Cincinnati and Columbus.

The City of Wilmington operates its own publicly funded Rural Public Transportation Service through Wilmington Transit Systems; it is funded by the City of Wilmington, Ohio Department of Transportation, and the Federal Transportation Administration.

== Notable people ==
- Kroger Babb, film and TV producer
- Andrea Bowers, artist
- Michael Bray, antiabortion activist, author, and terrorist
- James W. Denver, soldier, politician, and lawyer for whom Denver, Colorado is named
- James Henry Garland, Roman Catholic bishop
- Jane Osborn Hannah, opera singer
- Stephanie Hodge, actress
- Clarence Jones, jazz pianist and composer
- Charles Murphy, former owner of the Chicago Cubs
- Quinten Rollins, NFL player for the Green Bay Packers
- Cliff Rosenberger, Ohio House of Representatives, 102nd speaker of the house
- Gary Sandy, actor
- Charles B. Timberlake, U.S. representative from Colorado
- Norris Turney, jazz musician
- Michael Wilson, NFL and CFL football offensive lineman
- Jarron Cumberland, NBA player
