= Roy G Bentley =

American poet

Roy Bentley
- Roy Glenn Bentley
- Born: January 20, 1954 (age 72); Dayton, Ohio, U.S.
- Occupations: poet, academic
- Writing career
- Period: Late 20th-21st century
- Genre: Poetry

Roy Glenn Bentley (born January 20, 1954) is an Appalachian-American poet and creative writing professor. The lives of the poor in America are the primary focus of his work. He has been published in poetry journals as well as in four books of poetry and ten chapbooks.

== Early life ==
Bentley was born in Dayton, Ohio in the USA. He grew up there and later in Heath, Ohio. Both are towns in the mountainous economically deprived Appalachia area in the eastern United States. He was officially named Roy Glenn Bentley II by his parents, both from eastern Kentucky, the late Roy Glenn Bentley Sr., a civil servant, and the late Nettie D. (née Potter) Bentley. Poet Roy Bentley is currently married to Gloria Regalbuto Bentley.

== Education and career ==
Bentley is quoted as being inspired to start writing poetry at the age of 15 after watching the 1969 movie Easy Rider. Bentley graduated from Ohio University and has taught creative writing at a number of colleges and universities including Denison University, Ohio University, Hocking College, and Central Ohio Technical College in Newark, Ohio.

== Poetic themes ==
Bentley's works have been noted as focusing on what he calls the 'different in America' by personifying the unheard people of the United States and capturing the voice of the people for whom the so-called American Dream has not been so charitable and exploring the lives of people of lower socioeconomic standing, Vietnam War veterans, as well as highlighting the struggles of women in contemporary society. Women as mothers, grandmothers, and daughters feature in some of his poems such as "Mirror, Brush and Comb" and "Far" from the poetry collection edited by Neil Carpathios entitled "Every River on Earth, Writing from Appalachia Ohio" in these poems as it is noted in the preface of that book and Bentley's poems themselves. (ISBN 9780821445105) In highlighting the strong vein of Appalachia heritage in his poetry, he has also stated that a major portion of his poetry is autobiographical.

His poems also often feature elements of jazz, rock and roll, and country music Examples include the work of jazz musician John Coltrane as in the poem "Listening to Coltrane on the 4th of July", folk musician Bob Dylan such as Blood on the Tracks in Bentley's poem entitled "And Blood on the Tracks in the tape player", and rock and roll artist Bruce Springsteen's Tunnel of Love in a poem entitled "Tunnel of Love" which appeared in "Love Poems and Other Messages for Bruce Springsteen" edited by Jennifer Bosveld (ISBN 9781589987982).

== Writing fellowships ==
Bentley has been awarded fellowships for his work, including a fellowship from the National Endowment for the Arts in 2001-2002 and fellowships from the Florida Division of Cultural Affairs, and the Ohio Arts Council (six times honored) for his poetry, a majority of which is reminiscence of growing up and living in Appalachia with its people in the landscape of the broader U.S.A.

== Review ==
Regarding Poet Roy Bentley's work, reviewer Jason Barry focuses on Bentley's "gritty" references to the effects on people due to the economy, the workplace, alcoholism, child abuse, and the aging and death of loved ones - this in the settings of Ohio's Appalachia, as well as the Midwest and Florida, and also quotes and affirms poetry critic William Heyen words: "I know of no other poet this percussive, this relentless, this unswerving-poem after poem, his dedication to even debilitating truth will not allow him to flinch. His authority is such that as we read him we feel that, yes, this is the life we've lived and are responsible for".

Connie Willett Everett's review in Ohioana Quarterly, Winter 2007 comments on Bentley's Florida poems (Woman & Alligator) which trace Bentley's temporary transplantation south to Florida, moving to accommodate his wife's job: "Florida may be familiar, even desirable, vacation land for Northerners, but living there is another matter. Ohio has its abolitionist past, and Florida has, well, something else. [Bentley's] avid readers will want to grab this book for their collections. New readers will discover Bentley at his best."

== Published works ==
In addition to publishing individual poems in a variety of poetry journals, Bentley has published poetry collections of his work in the following books and chapbooks:

Books (in order of publication):
- Boy in a Boat (University of Alabama Press,1986) ISBN 9780817302900
- Any One Man (Bottom Dog Press, 1992) ISBN 0933087233
- The Trouble with a Short Horse in Montana (White Pine Press, 2006) ISBN 9781893996779
- Starlight Taxi (Lynx House Press, 2013) ISBN 9780899241302
- Walking with Eve in the Loved City (Finalist for the Miller Williams Poetry Prize, University of Arkansas Press, 2018) ISBN 9781682260579
Chapbooks (in order of publication):
- "The Way into Town" Bellingham, WA, Signpost Press, (1984) ISBN 9780936563039
- "The Edge of Heaven" (1988);
- "Reparation" Pudding House Publications, (2001) ISBN 9781930755635
- "Greatest Hits: 1980-2001" Pudding House Publications (2002) ISBN 9781589980457
- "Bentley Hotel" Pudding House Publications (2005) ISBN 9781589983717
- "Strange Privacies" Southeast Missouri State University Press (2006), ISBN 9780976041368
- "Woman & Alligator: The Florida Poems" (2007);
- "Funerals in the South" (2008);
- "The Idiot’s Guide to the Afterlife" Pudding House Publications (2010) ISBN 9781589987920
- At Mudlark: An Electronic Journal of Poetry & Poetics: "Saturday Afternoon at the Midland Theatre in Newark".

Online collections:
- "Six Poems by Roy Bentley" ;
- "Poems in Steinbeck Now"
- "Poems in The Adirondack Review"
- "Poems in The Southern Review"
- "Poems at Hamilton Stone Review, Issue 29, Fall 2013"

== Awards ==
- 2013 Blue Lynx Prize for Poetry for "Starlight Taxi"
- 2006 White Pine Poetry Prize for "The Trouble with a Short Horse in Montana"
- 1984 Signpost Press Poetry Award
- Copperdome Poetry Chapbook Competition, Southeast Missouri State University Press for "Strange Privacies"
