= Cabaret (TV program) =

1955 Canadian variety show

- Genre: Variety
- Presented by: Marsh Phimister
- Country of origin: Canada
- Original language: English
- No. of seasons: 1

Production
- Production locations: Winnipeg, Manitoba
- Running time: 30 minutes

Original release
- Network: CBC Television
- Release: 8 September – 20 October 1955

Cabaret is a Canadian variety show that aired on CBC Television in 1955.

== Premise ==
This production's set resembled a nightclub where dancing and singing was featured. It was the first television variety show to be produced in Winnipeg. Host Marsh Phimister was joined by singers Maxine Ware and Ann MacLeod, by musician-dancer Del Wagner. The house band was the Mitch Parks Orchestra.

== Scheduling ==
This half-hour series was broadcast in Montreal, Ottawa and Toronto on Thursdays at 8:00 p.m. (Eastern) from 8 September to 20 October 1955.
