= Rivière (jewellery) =

Necklace

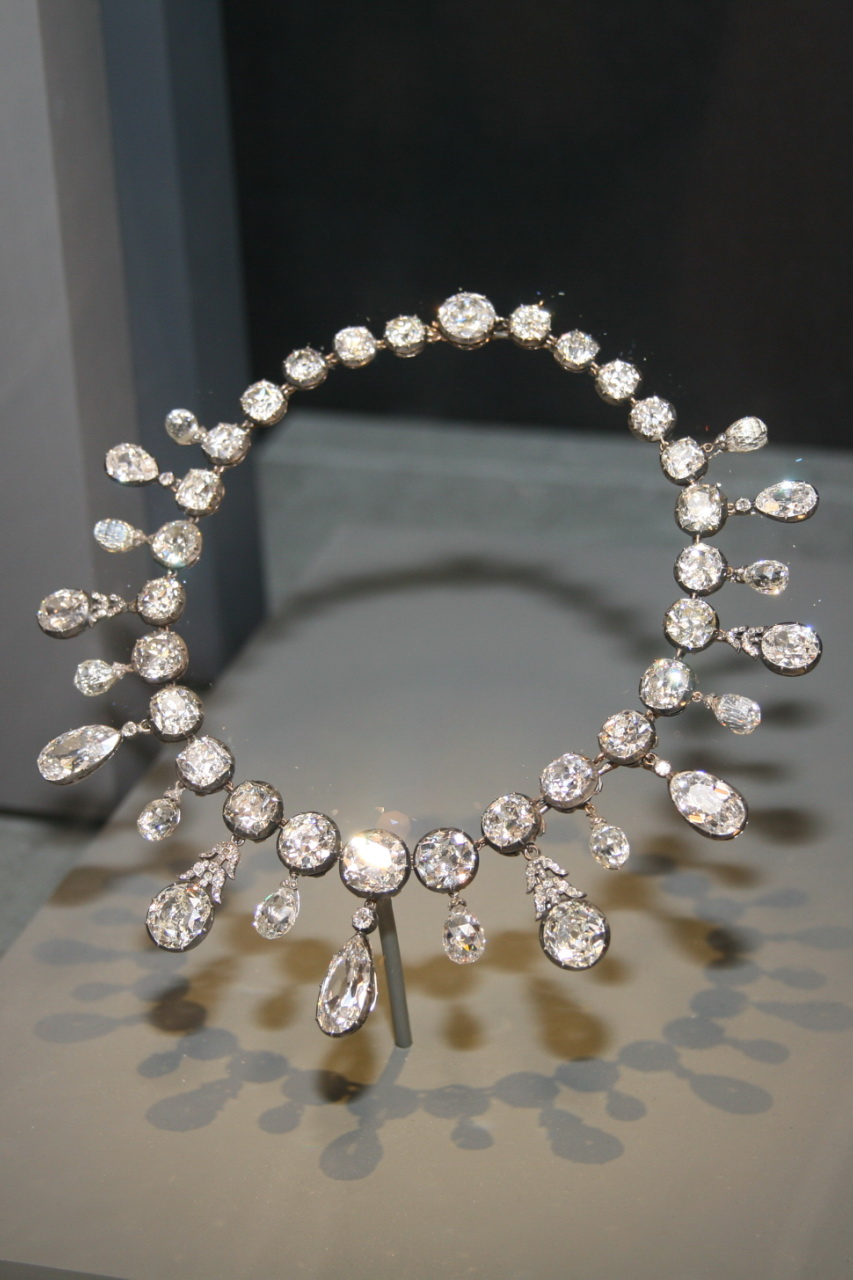
Diamond rivière with pendant stones

A rivière is a necklace consisting of one or more strings of linked gemstones. Usually only one kind of gemstone is used in a rivière, with all stones of the same colour and cut. The stones are either all the same size, or gradually increase in size towards the middle of the necklace. Rivières have been worn since the 18th century and are still a popular type of necklace.

== Description ==
The name rivière refers to the French word for "river", because the stones are thought to ‘flow’ around the neck. A rivière is usually quite short (about 35 cm).

In a rivière, the silver, gold, or platinum settings are designed to be inconspicuous. The necklace's impact comes entirely from the uninterrupted line of gemstones, identical in colour and cut. The stones are either all the same size, or vary gradually from small to larger towards the bottom of the necklace. Diamonds as well as coloured stones can be used in rivières, and pendant stones or a pendant cross may be attached. These pendants can often be detached to make the necklace more versatile. During the nineteenth century, rivières were introduced that had two or three strings of stones instead of one.

== History ==
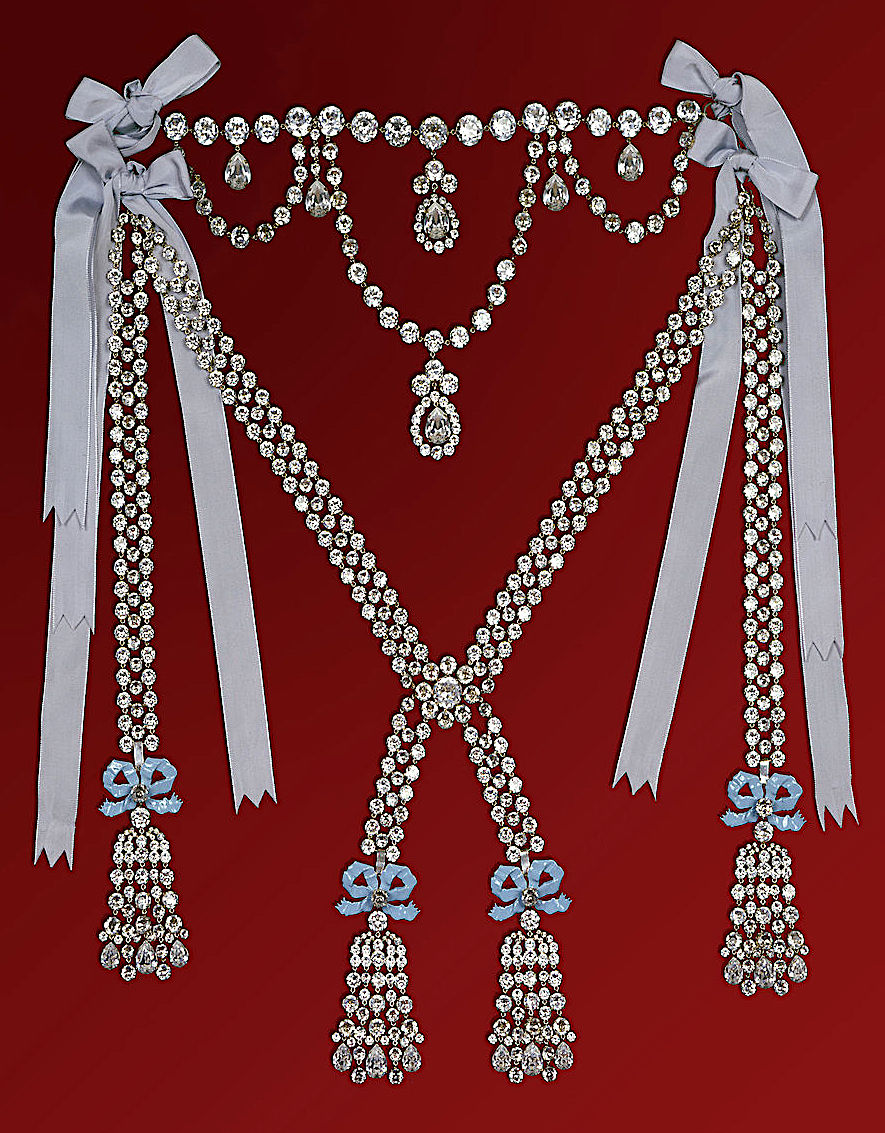
Replica of the 'Collier de la Reine' - example of a very elaborate early rivière.

The rivière became popular in the 18th century. In the earliest rivières, the stones were encased in settings with closed backings, and jewellers often strung the stones together on a cord or ribbon. In the 19th century a collet-set or prongs became the preferred settings for the stones. In these settings, the back is open, allowing the stones to better reflect the light. Instead of using ribbons or cords to create the string, the stones were linked together like a chain.

In the 18th century, multicoloured harlequin rivières were briefly fashionable, featuring gemstones in different colours. An (in)famous example of a rivière was the "collier de la Reine" of Queen Marie-Antoinette of France. Rivières are still a popular model of necklace and continue to be worn.
