= Bezel =

Section on the hoop of a ring

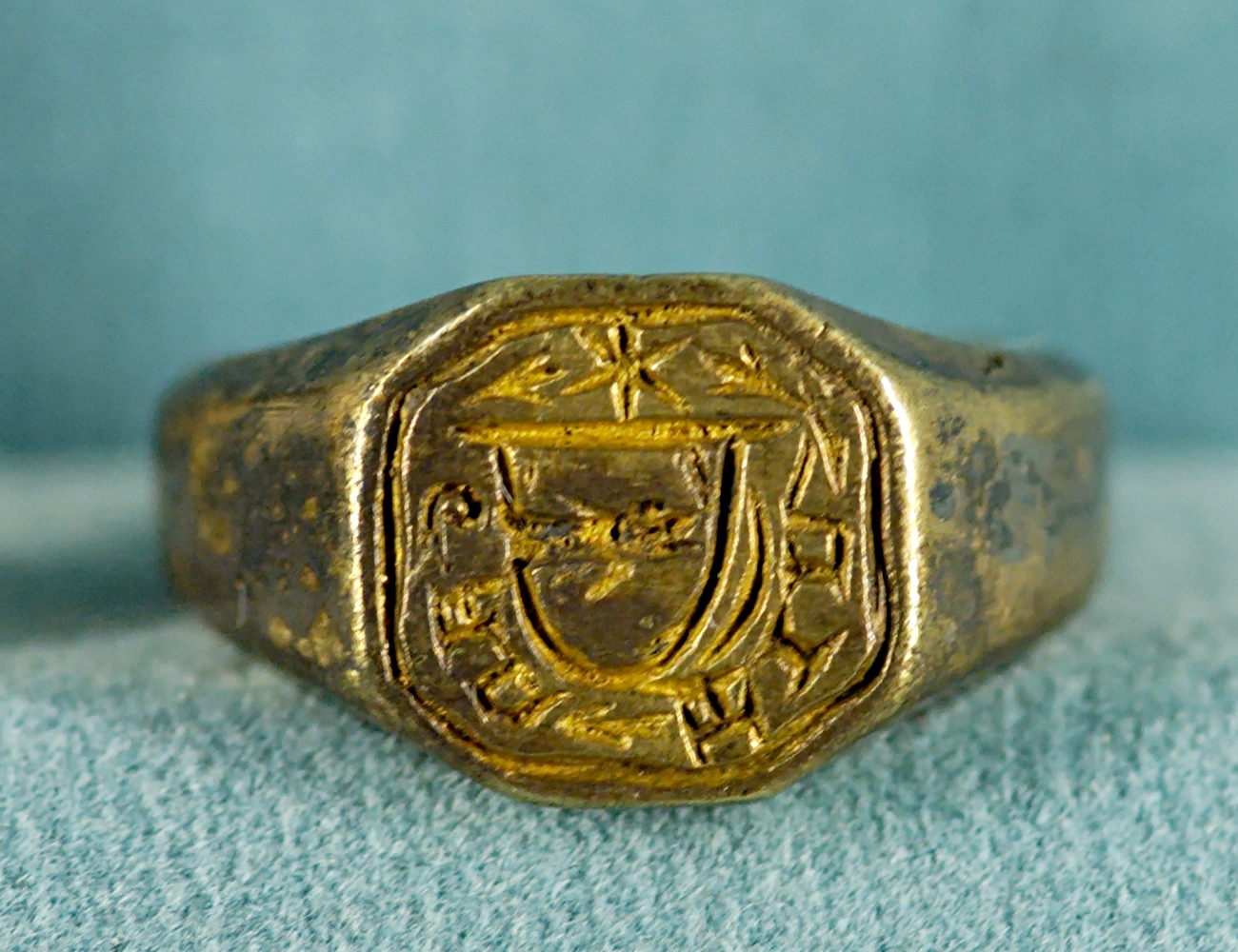
Signet ring with engraved bezel

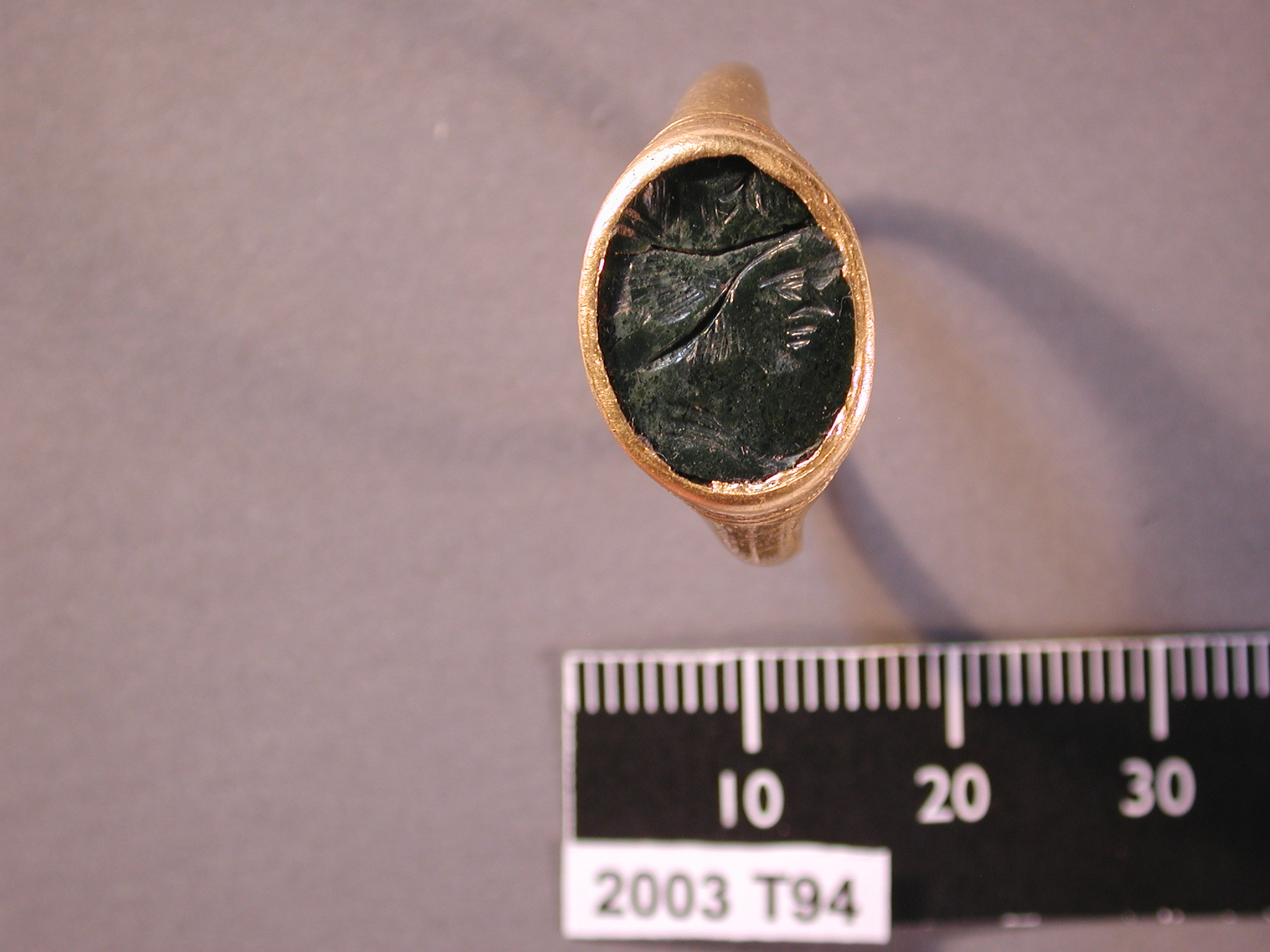
Ring with an engraved gem in a bezel setting

A bezel is a wider and usually thicker section of the hoop of a ring, which may contain a gem or a flat surface (usually with an engraved design, as in a signet ring). Rings are normally worn to display bezels on the upper or outer side of the finger. In gem-cutting the term bezel is used for those sloping facets (also called sides or faces) of a cut stone that surround the flat table face, which is the large, horizontal facet on the top.

In vehicles, it is the part of the bodywork that surrounds a headlight or turn signal. On a cell phone or tablet, it is the back surface that frames the LCD screen.

The word may also refer to a bezel setting for a stone, which is a general term for a setting holding the stone in place with a raised metal rim for the stone, the rim's lip encircling and overlapping the edges of the stone, thus holding it in place. Modern bezel settings typically use a band of metal containing a groove and a flange (i.e. projecting lip) to hold a watch crystal or gemstone in its setting. This was the earliest method of setting gemstones into jewelry. In historic examples, such rings were often made by leaving a hole or slot in the ring with a thin lip which was bent over once the stone was inserted, holding it in place.

Other types of bezel settings, less used in modern jewelry, are swivel bezels where the bezel, perhaps just formed of a stone with a metal rod through it, can rotate, and box bezels, where a "box" or cage forms the bezel, often sitting on the main ring hoop, and perhaps open at the top where there is a stone.

== Etymology ==
The word bezel, with an earliest attribution from 1605 to 1615, derives from the Old French *besel (13c.; Modern French biseau), cognate with Spanish and Portuguese bisel; of uncertain origin, perhaps literally "a stone with two angles," from Vulgar Latin *bis-alus, from bis- "twice" (from PIE root *dwo- "two") + ala "wing, side" (see alar). Bezel is akin to French biseau, meaning bevel or chamfer.

The noun meaning "slope of the edge of a cutting tool," and also "groove by which a stone is held in its setting" was from the 1610s. The verb meaning "grind (a tool) down to an edge" is from 1670s.

The noun meaning "oblique face of a gem" is from c. 1840.

== Bezel settings ==
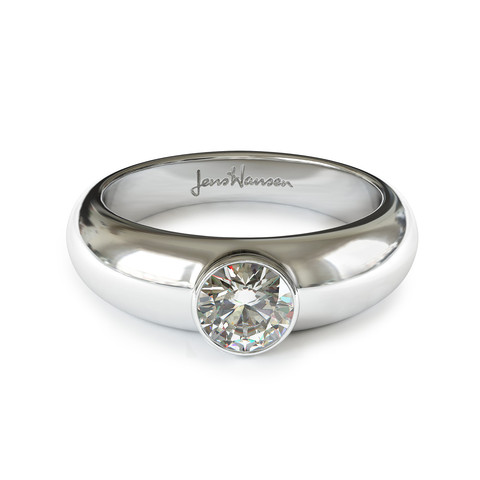
Diamond held in its setting with a bezel

In making a typical modern bezel setting, the bezel is shaped into the size and shape of the gem and then soldered into place on the metal of the jewelry. The prepared stone is then placed into the bezel and the metal is pressed down over the edges of stone, locking it into place.

A cabochon stone, a gemstone that is not faceted, usually relies on the shallow angle cut into the side of the stone, which helps the metal to stay in place. With a clear, faceted stone, such as a diamond, a shallow groove is cut into the bezel itself. The girdle, or widest part of the gemstone, is placed in the bezel, which is then pushed down over the girdle. The pressure of the bezel over the edge keeps the stone in place.

Bezel settings for diamonds are also called rub-over settings; they have a diamond completely surrounded by a precious metal band which fastens the diamond securely into place. Bezel settings use a type of elevated collar which wraps the rim of the diamond in a complete metal edging. This type of diamond ring setting is the most secure fastener for the stones. The bezel setting also protects the diamond better than other types of settings, such as the prong setting. A flush setting for diamond rings is a variation on the rub-over or bezel setting. In the flush setting, the stone is placed into an opening and affixed at the bottom of the stone. The top of the diamond is extended above the base.

=== Bezel setting advantages ===
One advantage of the bezel setting, as compared to the prong setting, is that the diamond is better protected from accidental rubbing or blows, and is less likely to allow the diamond to scratch whatever it may come into contact with. The bezel setting is also more secure, so the diamond is less likely to be dislodged.

== Watch bezel ==
Video of a diving watch having an adjustable bezel to mark the start time of a dive

An extension of the term bezel setting can refer to a rotatable rim on a clock or watch used to indicate certain data such as elapsed time.

== Sources ==
- Campbell, Gordon, "Bezel", Grove Art Online, Oxford Art Online, Oxford University Press, Accessed 4 July 2013, Subscription required
