= Colonnette =

Small slender column

A colonnette is a small slender column, usually decorative, which may support an arch, beam or lintel. Colonnettes have also been used to refer to a feature of furnishings such as a dressing table and case clock, and even studied by archeologists in Roman ceramics. Architectural colonnettes are typically found in "a group in a parapet, balustrade, or cluster pier". The term columnette has also been used to refer to thin columns. In Khmer art, the colonnette designates in particular the columns which frame the doors of the sanctuaries and which are one of the dating elements of their style. Summits of complexity were attained in the development of the Khmer colonnette, according to Philippe Stern:

There a few designs which present, as well as the khmer colonnette, a continuity of evolution, the persistence of a direction, which, though it may weaken at times, is taken up again each time.

— Philippe Stern

== Etymology ==
The -ette suffix, from French language, is a diminutive, which can also have a condescending connotation: in our case, it shifts the meaning from column to small column or fake columns. In the field of Angkorian archeology, Edme Casimir de Croizier was the first to use the name of colonnette in his study of Khmer art in 1875. In Khmer language, however, the term used "សសរពេជ្រ" (Soso petr), literally translates as "diamond columns", showing the importance attributed to these artifacts.

== Topography ==
=== Graeco-Roman ===
The Greeks used funerary colonnettes to support epitaphs. In the Demetrian necropolis, a colonnette marked the tomb a person whose epitaph was inscribed at the top under a garland carved with ivy leaves.

In the Roman Empire, colonnettes were used on funerary altars, as in the Lyon.

=== Early Christian and medieval ===
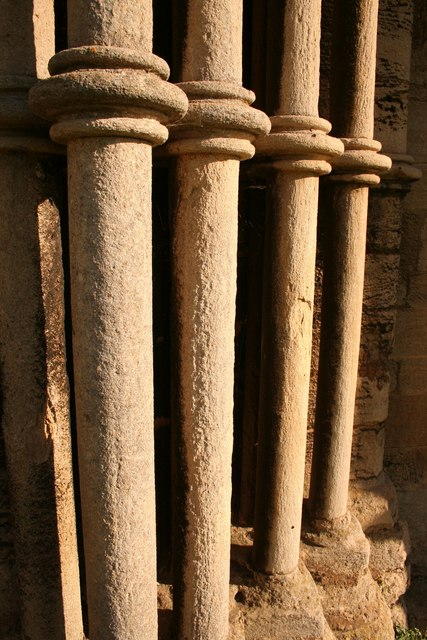
Norman colonettes at St. Leonard's Priory, Stamford from the 12th century

As the Roman Empire shifted toward Christianity, the use of colonettes in funerary art was conserved as well: thus, sarcophagi, such as those kept in the paleo-Christian churches of Arles, which mostly belong to the 4th or 5th century, are often decorated with arcades carried on colonnettes whose shafts have been reduced. Colonnettes with capitals were later used to decorate the cloisters of Romanesque abbeys such as those of the Romanesque portal and the cloister of Saint-Trophime d'Arles, or those of Moissac, Cluny, or even the crypts of the abbey of Jouarre. Colonnettes were also used for holy water fonts.

In Gothic architecture, the use of the colonnettes became particularly popular for the decoration of the triforium, as in the emblematic case of the Cathedral of Bourges proving the success of “discontinuous support”.Chartres Cathedral has a pilier cantonné with four colonettes attached to a large central core that support the arcade, aisle vaults and nave-vaulting responds.

=== Maya civilisation ===
Groups of inset colonnettes are an essential decorative feature of the classic Puuc colonnette style but are also found in numerous Chenes and Rio Bec buildings. Colonnettes in the Puuc style of Yucatán resemble the balusters found in Cambodia.

=== India ===
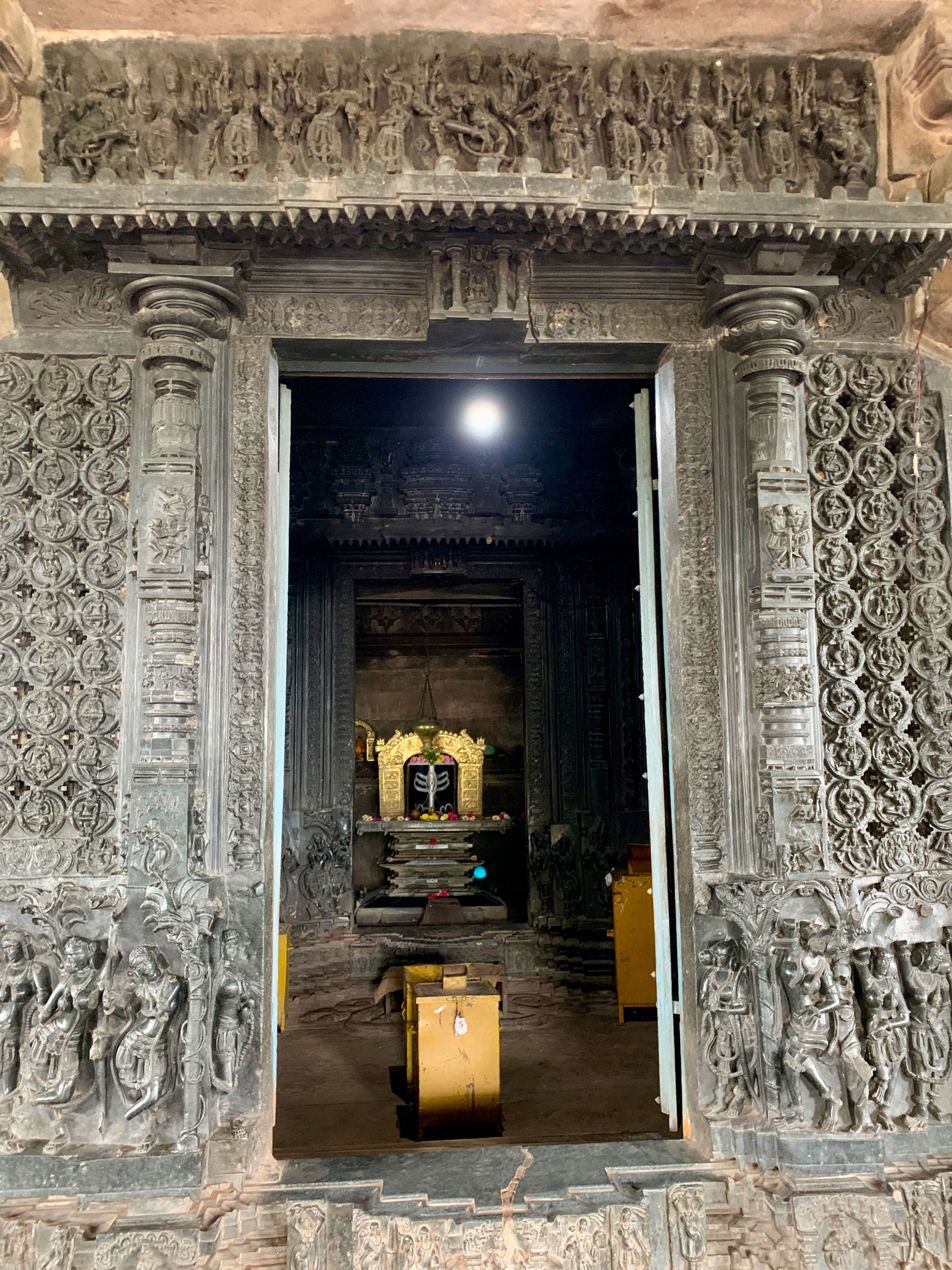
The Ramappa temple complex in India consists of two temples next to each other, another trikuta temple, a Sanskrit inscription pillar, a Nandi monument and several mandapas.

Colonnettes are widely present in classic Indian architecture, and it is used by both Muslims and Christians in India as well for the decoration of places of worship.

Vittala Temple in Hampi is famous for its "musical pillars" carved to create a single central member with four surrounding colonnettes, each with its own base, shaft and capital, unified at the top by a single capital. The colonnettes are supposed to produce different musical notes.

=== Laos ===
In Laos, the tradition of wooden temple architecture survived until recent times and wooden colonnettes of the same shape as those of the classic Khmer monuments can still be seen.

== The Khmer colonnette ==
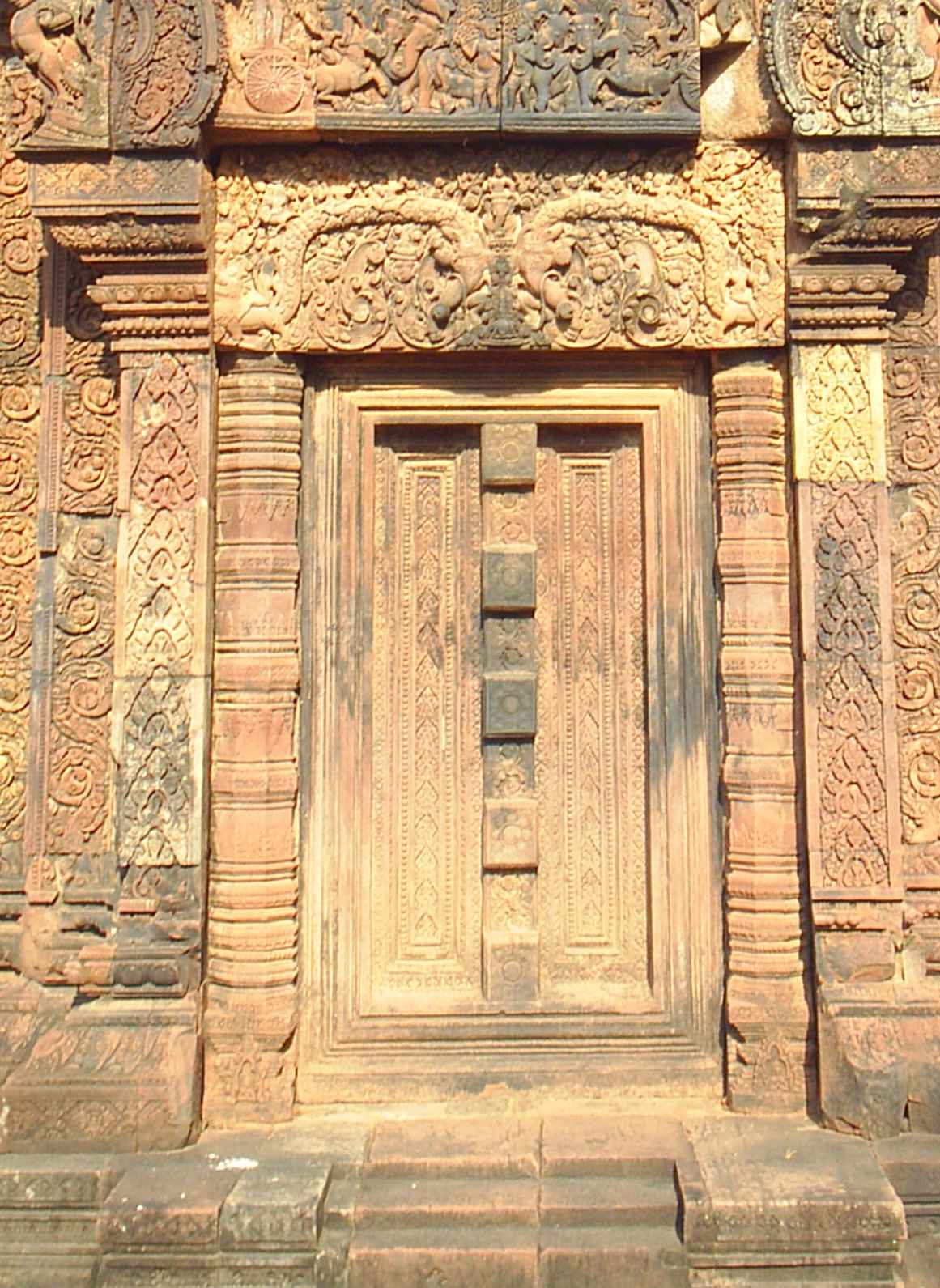
Blind door framed by colonettes.

=== Indian origin ===
The Khmer colonnettes framing the doors borrow from Indian ones, also framing doors or drawing a niche around a character. These borrowings concern the shape of the barrel which is of circular section, partly the composition of the capital (bulb in both cases) and the decoration of the column: garlands underlining the capital, bands with diamond and rounded themes. However, the Khmer column has a more elaborate base and a much richer decoration where mouldings and rings are of great importance.

=== Khmer use ===
The Khmer colonnettes have from their earliest appearance in the sixth century in the Phnom Da style: a section with garlands and pendants, a round section, and a widened upper section. These divisions become more complex in the seventh century, with the loops between the garlands being filled with pendants, thin leaves, or undulating small tongues. The garlands disappear altogether in the eight century from the style of Prei Kmeng to that of Kompong Preah. By the end of the Kompong Preah style around 800, the colonnettes will change from round to octagonal.

According to Philip Stern, from the ninth century onwards, the rings and groups of mouldings of the colonnettes are more numerous, increasing thus the number of the divisions of the shaft. The number of the most important elements of these groups goes on increasing from 3 all the way to 9. Up the eleventh century, the rings generally increase in size and relief. On the other hand, the blanks that separate the groups of rings and mouldings diminish in height as also the size of the leaves that decorate these blanks become smaller. Consequently, the number of leaves increases, changing from one large leaf on the side to a series of leaves and tiny dog-tooth pendeloques.

The 17 pairs of small columns discovered on Mount Kulen present a remarkable unity. Five main characteristics of the Kulen style are easily recognizable:

- the octagonal or square shape of the small columns, the posterior columns being essentially round;
- the decoration of the shaft of the columns with separate leaves, one per side, which fits well with the octagonal shape;
- the shaft of the column flares out in an elegant curve with two extremities, accompanied by a fillet with finials, a simple small moulding decorated with a motif of five-pointed fleurons;
- the shapes and decorations of the rings which have more relief than the older columns;
- the crowning of the small columns similar to its base;

With the Bakheng style at the beginning of the tenth century, more and more bulbs superposed which gradually flattened as a "pile of dishes" as in the Angkor Wat style of the twelfth century.

The decadence of the colonnette corresponds to the swan song of Khmer art and the wonderful style of the Bayon from 1181 to 1219 approximately. The superbandance and the huge dimensions of the edifices lead to an economy of labour and to a loss of interest in decors. The overdecoration continues but the gradation disappears. All that remains is the rings with some standard, identical combinations, each of them followed by a reduced blank.

=== Technique ===
Colonnettes, like decorative lintels, were usually fixed in place before being carved. However, the side of the colonnette which, once in place, were so close to the wall or the pilaster that one could not handle hammer and chisel to sculpt, were decorated on the ground.

The capital of the colonnette was plain at the beginning: a bulb, a fillet, the widening shape and the square abacus are superposed. This schema became more and more intricate over centuries. The capitals are now more visible than the bases of the colonnettes which were so often destroyed.

The colonnette has a subcategory known as the baluster: a short colonnette, requiring a support. It is also used to designate the small columns that bar a window.

=== Influence ===
==== Khmer archaeology and dating ====
The colonnettes are key to Khmer archaeology as they aid the dating of Angkorian temples not only by certain of the decorative details which it bears, but also by the set and the very connection of its elements.

We had to build our theory on the style of Jayavarman II, with only one lintel and one small colonnette.

— Philippe Stern, 1938

This method of dating through identification of styles alone has been criticized and is insufficient if not corroborated by other elements. According to Philip Stern, what matters is not the number of parts examined, but the number of convergent details observed.

==== Khmer heritage ====
Colonettes and pilasters found in Buddhist stupas still echo the religious architecture of north-west India as one of the rare elements of classical Khmer architecture that have survived in contemporary Khmer architecture found also in Thailand especially in the period of Ayutthaya. In 2016, there was still concerned that colonnettes remaining on site in Cambodia, after having been pillaged massively in the 1980s, where still being threatened as they remain on the red-list of Cambodian antiquities at risk set up by the International Council of Museums. Khmer colonnettes have become a marker of Khmer identity, and are now used by revivalists for the decoration of secular buildings, such as government headquarters like the Ministry for Land Management inaugurated in 2021.

== See also ==
- Baluster
- Pilaster

== Bibliography ==
- Stern, Philippe (2020-01-23), "La vie d'un motif: la colonnette khmère", Au service d'une biologie de l'art., Esthétique et sciences des arts (in French), Villeneuve d'Ascq: Presses universitaires du Septentrion, pp. 99–158, ISBN 978-2-7574-2590-9
- de Coral-Rémusat, Gilberte (1934). "I. Architecture et décoration". Bulletin de l'École française d'Extrême-Orient. 34 (1): 401–413. doi:10.3406/befeo.1934.4969.
