= Kings Theatre (Brooklyn) =

Entertainment venue in New York City

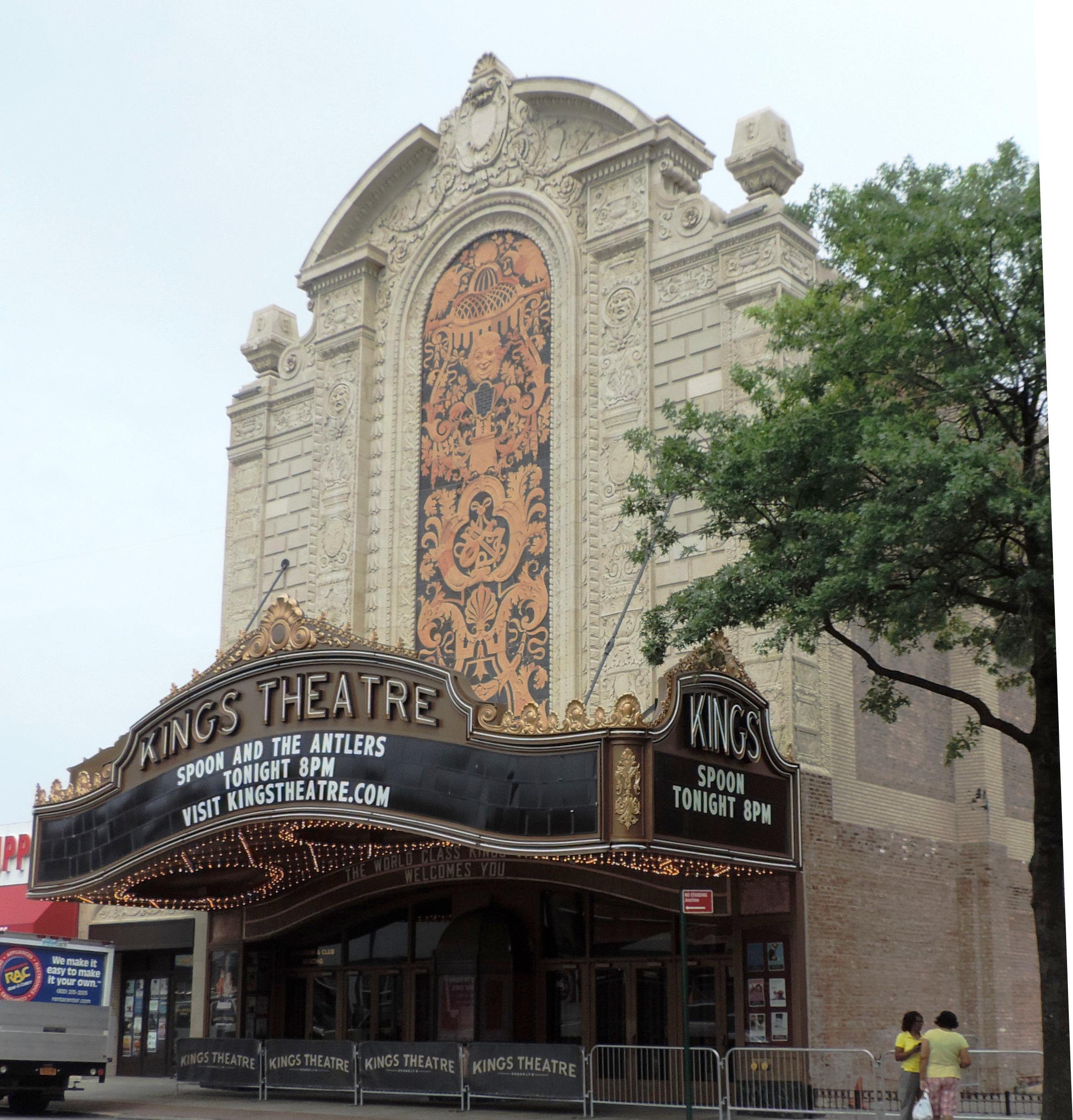
- Renovated facade (2015)
- Interactive map of Kings Theatre
- Address: 1027 Flatbush Avenue; Brooklyn, New York; United States
- Owner: New York City Economic Development Corporation; Loew's Theatres (1929–1977)
- Operator: ATG Entertainment
- Capacity: 3,250
- Type: Movie palace
- Current use: Entertainment venue

Construction
- Opened: September 7, 1929
- Rebuilt: 2013–2015
- Years active: 1929–1977; 2015–present
- Architects: Rapp and Rapp; Martinez & Johnson (restoration)

Website
- us.atgtickets.com/venues/kings-theatre-brooklyn/whats-on/
- Loew's Kings Theatre
- U.S. National Register of Historic Places
- New York State Register of Historic Places
- Location within New York City Location within New York Location within the United States
- Location: 1027 Flatbush Avenue; Brooklyn, New York City
- Coordinates: 40.6458°N 73.9575°W
- Built: 1929
- Architectural style: French Baroque
- NRHP reference No.: 12000534
- NYSRHP No.: 04701.016185

Significant dates
- Added to NRHP: August 22, 2012
- Designated NYSRHP: June 27, 2012

The Kings Theatre (formerly Loew's Kings Theatre) is a theater and live performance venue at 1027 Flatbush Avenue in the Flatbush neighborhood of Brooklyn in New York City, New York. Designed by Rapp and Rapp as a movie palace, it opened on September 7, 1929, as one of five Loew's Wonder Theatres in the New York City area. The theater's interior decor was supervised by Rapp and Rapp along with Harold Rambusch. Owned by the New York City Economic Development Corporation, the Kings Theatre has been operated by ATG Entertainment since 2015. It is listed on the National Register of Historic Places.

The Kings Theatre occupies an irregular site and is divided into two sections: the lobby section and the auditorium. The lobby section has an elaborate terracotta facade with a marquee and an arched entrance storefront. The entrance leads to a vestibule and two lobbies with high ceilings, in addition to several foyers and lounges. The auditorium has 3,250 seats on two levels, with an elaborately decorated proscenium arch, walls, and ceilings. Like the other Wonder Theaters, the Loew's Kings Theatre featured a "Wonder Morton" theater pipe organ manufactured by the Robert Morton Organ Company, though the organ has since been removed.

A theater on the site was originally proposed in 1919 by William Fox. Allied Owners Inc. took over the theater site and developed it starting in 1928, leasing the venue to Loew's Theatres. The Kings Theatre originally presented films and live shows, although the live shows were discontinued within a decade of the theater's opening. The theater slowly declined after World War II, screening films almost exclusively. The theater closed in August 1977 due to high costs and low attendance. Despite several attempts to redevelop the Kings Theatre, it lay abandoned for more than three decades and gradually decayed during that time. ACE Theatrical Group leased the theater from the New York City Economic Development Corporation in 2013 and, after a $95 million renovation, reopened it on January 23, 2015. Since then, the Kings Theatre has functioned as an event venue.

== Description ==
The Loew's Kings Theatre was designed by the architectural firm of Rapp and Rapp. It is one of three theaters that Rapp and Rapp designed in New York City, the others being the Brooklyn Paramount and the Times Square Paramount. The Loew's Kings Theatre was one of five Loew's Wonder Theatres in the New York City area, along with the Jersey Theatre in Jersey City, the 175th Street Theatre in Manhattan, the Paradise Theatre in the Bronx, and the Valencia Theatre in Queens. Rapp and Rapp had intended for the theater's elaborate design to impress visitors and make them feel special.

The theater is located at 1027 Flatbush Avenue in the Flatbush neighborhood of Brooklyn in New York City. The site occupies the center of a city block bounded to the south by Duryea Place and to the north by Tilden Avenue. The Kings Theatre occupies an irregular site and is divided into two sections: the lobby section and the auditorium. The main entrance faces west toward Flatbush Avenue; the lobbies extend east of the entrance before turning 45 degrees to the southeast. The auditorium extends to the northeast of the lobbies. The theater was originally bounded by East 22nd Street to the east, but that street was closed and partially removed to make way for an expanded stage house in the 2010s. Behind the stage house is a public parking lot located east of East 22nd Street. The Sears Roebuck & Company Department Store is located immediately southeast of the theater.

=== Facade ===
The facade rises three stories from Flatbush Avenue. The roof of the lobby section measures 38 feet (12 m) tall, although the facade on Flatbush Avenue is 40 feet (12 m) tall, obscuring the lobby's roof. The auditorium originally had a roof measuring 84 feet (26 m) or 87 feet (27 m) tall. There are 3-foot-tall (0.91 m) parapets surrounding the roof of the auditorium to the west and east. In addition, the originally stage house to the northeast of the auditorium measured 35 feet (11 m) tall. The replacement stage house is 97 feet (30 m) tall and occupies part of the former right-of-way of East 22nd Street.

==== Flatbush Avenue elevation ====
The only elevation of the facade with substantial decoration is on Flatbush Avenue, which is 40 feet (12 m) wide. The main entrance is through a segmentally arched, brass-and-glass storefront, topped by a frieze with text welcoming visitors to the theater. The doors are recessed slightly from the facade, and there is a bronze ticket booth protruding from the middle of the storefront, separating the doors into two sets of five. The storefront itself is polygonal in shape, with a marble base, a half-domed roof, and etched glass windows. There is a marquee above the storefront, which is suspended from two cables that protrude from the upper portion of the facade. The marquee originally had a concave soffit, but this was replaced in 1949 with a rectangular sign flanked by two rectangular light boxes. The original marquee was restored in the 2010s. The modern marquee contains the theater's name and 800 light bulbs. Unlike the original sign, it lacks the Loews name because AMC Theatres still used that name as a trademark in the 2010s.

The rest of the facade above the marquee is clad in cream-colored architectural terracotta and is divided vertically into three bays. The center bay of the facade includes a bas-relief with decorations such as acanthus leaves, birds, foliage, a mask, shields, and trefoils. This bas-relief is surrounded by a semicircular arch with terracotta moldings. On either side of the arch, within the outer bays, are terracotta pilasters with more bas-reliefs of motifs such as acanthus leaves, fleurs-de-lis, figures, scrolls, and urns. The outer bays also have rusticated terracotta blocks. Above the center of the roofline is a parapet with a segmentally-arched broken pediment with a medallion at the center. The outer corners are topped by finials. A vertical sign existed in front of the central bay until the 1980s.

==== Other elevations ====
The facades of the lobby section's northern and southern elevations are clad in plain brick and lack windows. The southern elevation is discolored due to the presence of an adjacent one-story building that no longer exists. The facade of the auditorium is also utilitarian, with little decoration, although the auditorium does have some windows. There is a brick chimney above the southeastern corner of the auditorium. In addition, a parapet with terracotta coping runs above the perimeter of the auditorium. There are emergency-exit doorways leading from the northern and southern walls of the auditorium section.

=== Interior ===
The interior was designed by Harold Rambusch, who collaborated with Rapp & Rapp on the design details. Anne Dornin (Note: Also spelled "Ann") was also involved with the interior design. The decorative details were inspired by the decorations inside the Paris Opera House and Palace of Versailles. A contemporary source characterized the interiors as being decorated in the Italian Renaissance Revival style. There are only two above-ground stories, plus a basement. The interiors include a one-story-high entrance vestibule, a main lobby, an inner lobby, several foyers and lounges, and an auditorium. The back-of-house areas (such as dressing rooms, offices, and storage and mechanical areas) are within the basement, backstage, and near the entrance.

Originally, the theater's interior space totaled about 63,000 to 68,000 square feet (5,900 to 6,300 m^{2}). Following a renovation in the 2010s, it was expanded to 101,970 square feet (9,473 m^{2}). When the theater opened, it had a 400-foot-deep (120 m) well, which supplied 400 U.S. gallons (1,500 L) of water for the mechanical equipment every minute. There was also an air-filtering system that could clean about 140,000 cubic feet (4,000 m^{3}) of air per minute. The system drew air from openings on the building's roof, and it pushed out air via "mushrooms" under the auditorium's seats.

==== Vestibule and lobbies ====
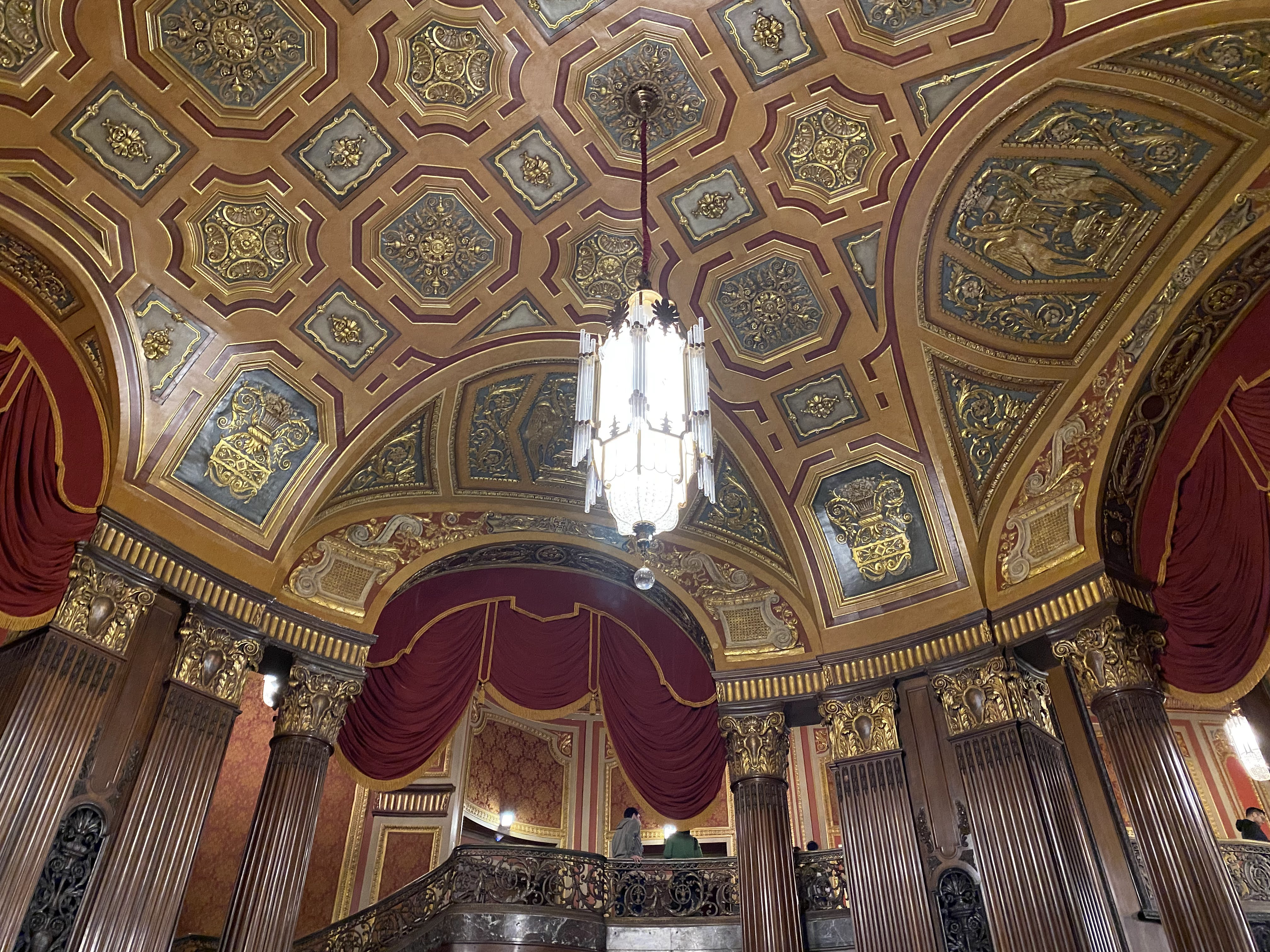
Interior of the main lobby

Just past the entrance is a north–south vestibule occupying the entire frontage on Flatbush Avenue. The vestibule's western wall has a storefront with brass-and-glass doors leading from the entrance, and the eastern wall has a nearly identical storefront leading to the lobby. There was a ticket booth on the eastern wall, which was identical to the one at the entrance, but no longer exists. On the vestibule's north and south walls are marble panels with mirrors. The floor of the vestibule is made of poured concrete with rubber mats. On the ceiling is a grid of iron beams, with rosettes at the intersections of each set of beams; the ceiling is surrounded by a plaster cornice.

To the east of the vestibule is the main lobby, which is oriented east–west and measures about 40 by 75 feet (12 by 23 m) across. The marble floor is divided into a grid of pink and white tiles with a red-and-black border. Originally, the space had brass railings so patrons could form queues. The walls are 30 feet (9.1 m) high; the lower portions are decorated with red marble dadoes, while the upper portions have walnut panels. On the western wall of the main lobby is the archway from the vestibule. The lobby walls contain groups of wooden pilasters with ornate capitals, which flank one arched bay to the north and two to the south. The lower portions of the arched bays have walnut display cases, while the upper portions have mirrors, draperies, and painted plaster decorations. The mirror frames, trim, and pilasters were all carved by hand. The eastern half of the north wall contains an archway, underneath which is a stair that ascends to the mezzanine. The main lobby's eastern wall has two archways, flanked by walnut columns in the Corinthian order; the left (northeast) archway leads to the orchestra-level foyer, while the right (southeast) archway leads to the inner lobby. The ceiling, inspired by that of the Palazzo Medici Riccardi, is made of plaster, with elaborate octagonal and square coffers. Three Art Deco lantern-shaped chandeliers with prisms, fleurs-de-lis, and pendeloques hang from the ceiling; each chandelier weighs about 1 short ton (0.89 long tons; 0.91 t).

The inner lobby is 80 by 32 feet (24.4 by 9.8 m) across, extending southeast from the main lobby, and is built of similar materials to the main lobby. On the southwestern wall are protruding wooden pilasters, which divide the wall into three arched bays. Wooden columns divide the northeastern wall into three archways, behind which are the mezzanine and the orchestra-level foyer; there is a cast iron balcony railing at the mezzanine level. A stair to the mezzanine runs along the southeastern wall. There are blind openings with wooden grilles behind the staircase. Red and gold draperies hang from the archways and arched bays. The barrel-vaulted ceiling is made of plaster, with coffers similar to those on the main lobby's ceiling, and has four chandeliers. In addition, the concrete floor is covered with carpeting.

==== Foyers and lounges ====
Directly northeast of the inner lobby are foyers on both the ground (orchestra) level and the mezzanine level, which have simpler design details than those in the lobbies. The orchestra-level foyer measures 30 feet (9.1 m) wide and 185 feet (56 m) long. It runs parallel to, and just to the northeast of, the inner lobby. Leading off the orchestra foyer are several lounges and other spaces. These include a men's lounge, a women's lounge, a cosmetic room, a coat-check room, offices, and a stair to the basement. The women's lounge had such decorations as draperies, marble fountains, and a marble fireplace mantel. The mezzanine foyer is directly above the orchestra foyer. The men's lounge, women's lounge, and cosmetic room all connect with the mezzanine foyer, and there is also a stair leading from the mezzanine foyer to a projection room. The projection room still exists, but the projector is no longer usable as of 2019; instead, a digital projector is used whenever the Kings screens movies. Three of the theater's four lounges were also restored in the 2010s and are open to the public.

On the southwestern wall of the orchestra foyer are archways leading from the inner lobby. These archways are decorated with patera and foliate ornament, and there are mirrors between each archway. On the orchestra foyer's northeastern wall, seven sets of double doors lead to the auditorium. There are sets of wooden windows between each group of doorways. The ceiling of the orchestra foyer is made of plaster and is mostly flat, except for decorative bas-relief panels and ceiling medallions with lanterns; the southeast end has a coffered ceiling. The walls are decorated with ornamental bas-reliefs and draperies; there is a wood baseboard at the bottom of each wall, as well as a cornice at the top. The floor is covered with a carpet.

The mezzanine foyer is accessed by two stairs, one each from the main and inner lobbies. The main-lobby stair ascends behind the north wall of that room; it is L-shaped with an intermediate landing. The bottom steps of the main-lobby stairs are curved, and the other steps have carpeted treads. In addition, the main-lobby stair has a cast-iron balustrade atop a marble base. The inner-lobby stair is decorated similarly and is also L-shaped, though the stair is within the inner lobby itself rather than behind a wall. There is a trapezoidal opening on the wall underneath the stair, with a metal grate. The mezzanine foyer itself has seven recessed double doors, surrounded by guilloché moldings, which lead to the auditorium's rear aisle. The foyer's floors are carpeted, while the ceiling has plaster decorations such as medallions. The plaster walls contain pilasters and decorative fabric panels, and a cornice runs atop each wall.

==== Auditorium ====
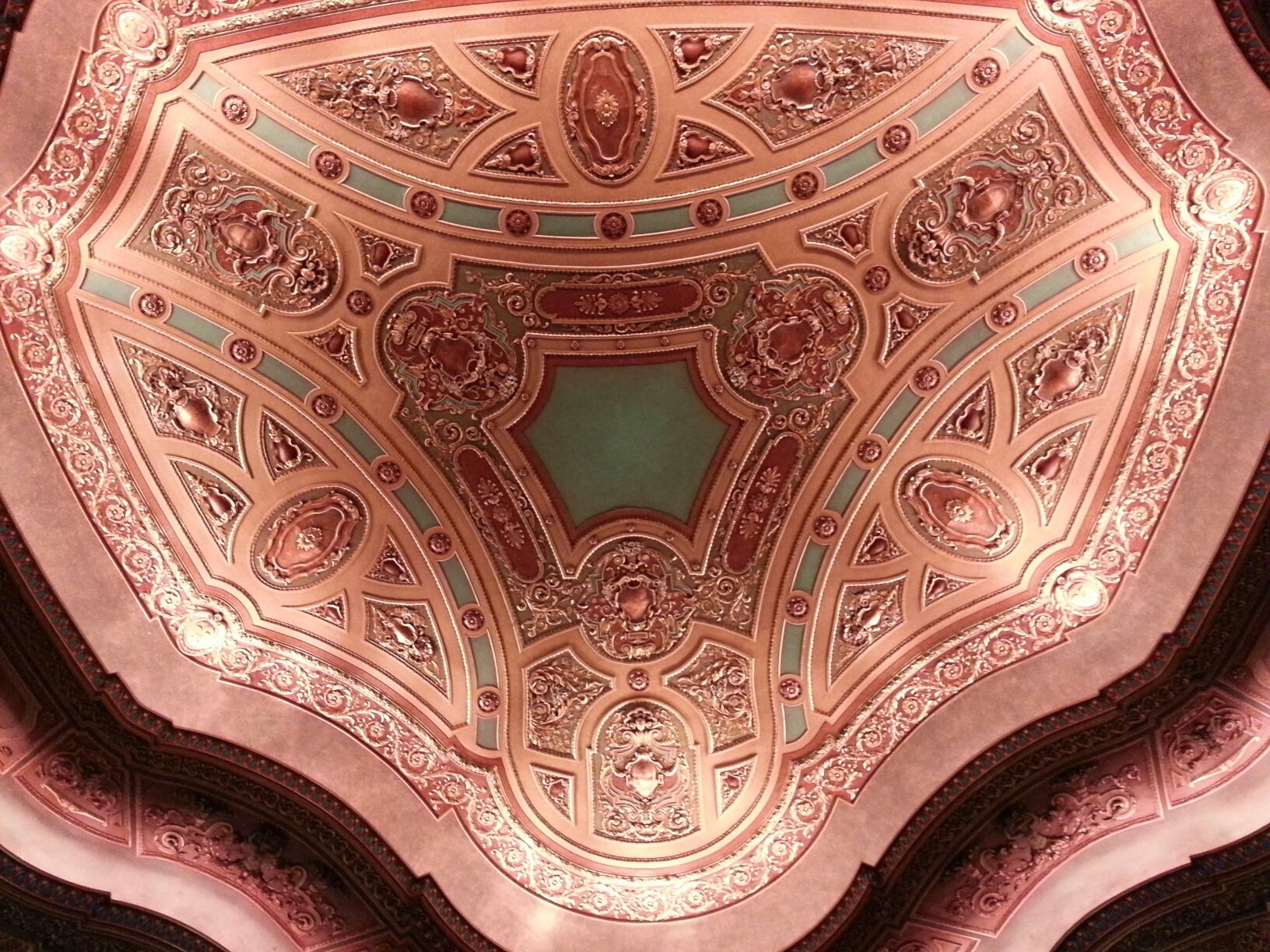
The auditorium's ceiling dome

The auditorium is symmetrically arranged on a southwest–northeast axis; it faces the stage in the northeast. The auditorium measures 155 feet (47 m) deep from front to rear, and it is 160 feet (49 m) wide at its rear wall, though the front rows are substantially narrower. The ceiling is 90 feet (27 m) tall. In contrast to other theaters with multiple balconies, the Loew's Kings Theatre has only one balcony level, since Rapp and Rapp wanted to improve the auditorium's acoustics. The balcony level is shallow and horseshoe-shaped. Both the orchestra level and the balcony are raked, sloping down toward an orchestra pit in front of the stage. When the theater was renovated in the 2010s, both levels were re-raked to improve sightlines from the rear seats.

The auditorium originally had 3,690 seats across two levels; the balcony had only 800 seats, and the remaining 2,890 seats were on the parterre-level orchestra. The capacity was downsized to 3,250 seats after the theater's 2010s renovation, with 2,400 seats in the orchestra and 800 in the balcony. Despite the reduced capacity, the theater is the fourth-largest live events venue in New York City as of 2015, behind Radio City Music Hall, The Theater at Madison Square Garden, and the Metropolitan Opera House.

Aisles extend through the orchestra level from the rear to the front, dividing the space lengthwise into seven sections. There is an additional cross-aisle partway through the orchestra level. Originally, the seats were 22 inches (560 mm) wide, larger than typical movie-theater seats of the period, which tended to be 18 to 19 inches (460 to 480 mm) wide. In addition, each row of seats was about 40 inches (1,000 mm) deep from one seatback to the next; by comparison, other theaters had seating rows that were only 32 inches (810 mm) deep. In the 2010s, the seats were widened, and legroom was increased as well. Approximately 300 seats in the modern-day theater, mostly near the stage and orchestra pit can be removed to increase capacity for standing-room only audiences. The stage measures 34 by 80 feet (10 by 24 m) across, and the orchestra pit, which can fit 40 musicians, measures 50 by 14 feet (15.2 by 4.3 m) across. The modern-day orchestra pit has a 350-square-foot (33 m^{2}) orchestra lift. In addition, the orchestra pit has a removable barricade for events where the front rows of seating are removed.

===== Design features =====
The orchestra pit at the front of the theater is surrounded by a plaster-and-marble balustrade. On the auditorium's northeastern wall is a segmental proscenium arch measuring 60 feet (18 m) high. Above the center of the arch is a protruding medallion. Under the archway, the theater originally had a triple-width screen. The archway has Baroque decorations such as acanthus leaves with rope motifs, in addition to guilloche leaves, fleurs-de-lis, and medallions. On either side of the proscenium arch are recessed niches, which contain equipment for the theater's organ. These niches rise the height of the theater and are elaborately decorated, with spiral column and garlands on either side of each niche. At the orchestra level, there are deep alcoves on either side of the proscenium arch. The side walls are 50 feet (15 m) high, and they contain Corinthian columns measuring 35 feet (11 m) high and 3 feet (0.91 m) across.

The underside of the balcony has an elaborate fascia and soffit made of plaster. There are round and square plaster columns under the balcony, which obstruct views from parts of the orchestra. In addition, a fulcrum truss supports the balcony. The balcony level itself has cast-iron lighting stanchions, and there are VIP seating areas on that level.

The rear and side walls contain a colonnade of distyle columns in the Corinthian order. These columns flank parabolic arches with red-and-gold draperies, which provide access to the mezzanine seats from the mezzanine's side aisles. The arches are set between wide piers, which contain fabric panels and small niches at the orchestra level. There are also murals on the balcony level. Above each of the piers are pendentives, which support the ceiling. The ceiling is made of plaster and is split up into colorful octagonal and square coffers. At the center of the ceiling is a recessed quatrefoil panel. The ceiling's color scheme was intended to harmonize with the decorations in the rest of the auditorium. The top of the ceiling dome is 75 feet (23 m) high and is decorated in a red, gold, and blue scheme.

===== Organ =====
Like the other Wonder Theaters, the Loew's Kings Theatre featured a "Wonder Morton" theater pipe organ manufactured by the Robert Morton Organ Company. The organ featured a console with 4 manuals and 23 ranks of pipes. There were 3,000 pipes in total, divided evenly between two organ lofts. When the theater was built, the organ cost $75,000 (equivalent to $1,406,000 in 2025). The organ remained at the theater until 1974, when Loew's disassembled the organ, with the intention of donating it to Town Hall in Manhattan. However, the instrument was never reinstalled; it was vandalized extensively, and parts of the organ were stolen. An organ collector from the Bronx, Donald Schwing, had acquired the remains of the organ by 1980. Paul Van Der Molen acquired the console in 1998 and rebuilt it in his house in Wheaton, Illinois.

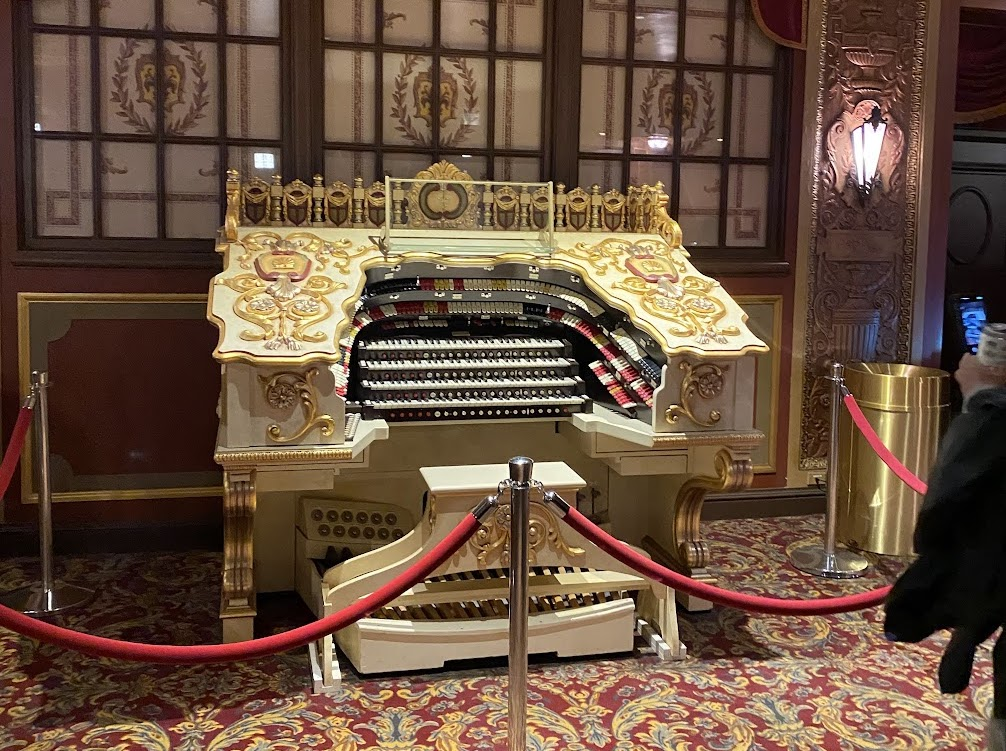
The original organ console

The Van Der Molen family donated Wonder Morton to the New York Theatre Organ Society in 2011. The organ was removed from the family's home and placed in storage for an anticipated return to the restored Kings Theatre. The renovation budget, however, did not include the $650,000 cost of relocating and reinstalling the organ. In December 2014, the theater's developer ACE Theatrical Group agreed to help develop an electronic reproduction of the Wonder Morton. The donated pipe work would be sold or donated to a suitable venue. The rest of Van Der Molen's organ, which was not part of the original Wonder Morton, is in the collection of the University of Oklahoma.

==== Back-of-house areas ====
The basement has a lounge and restrooms. There are several back-of-house spaces in the basement, such as a utility-meter room, an ushers' suite, refrigeration rooms, and machine rooms. There are storage rooms under the stage, along with rooms for the organ, piano, and musicians. The basement also had a basketball court; according to the New York Daily News, ushers were obligated to exercise there. In the 2010s, more restrooms were added to the basement, replacing the basketball court. When the theater was expanded in the 2010s, the original back-of-house spaces in the rear were partly demolished, and a new stage house was constructed. The back-of-house spaces on stage right are approximately 12 feet (3.7 m) wider than in the original stage house, and there are also a freight elevator, dressing rooms, offices, and restrooms. The expanded stage house has a loading dock and fly gallery as well.

== Use as movie palace ==
Movie palaces became common in the 1920s between the end of World War I and the beginning of the Great Depression. In the New York City area, only a small number of operators were involved in the construction of movie palaces. These theaters' designers included the legitimate-theater architects Thomas W. Lamb, C. Howard Crane, and John Eberson. By the late 1920s, numerous movie palaces were being developed in outlying neighborhoods in New York City; previously, the city's movie palaces had been concentrated in Midtown Manhattan. The five Wonder Theatres were developed by Loew's Inc., which at the time was competing with Paramount-Publix. In 1927, Loew's president Nicholas Schenck agreed to take over five sites from Paramount-Publix, in exchange for agreeing not to build competing theaters in Chicago; these five sites became the Wonder Theatres.

=== Development and opening ===
Prior to the development of the current theater, the site at 1027 Flatbush Avenue had been occupied by a Brooklyn City Railroad railyard. William Fox bought the site in November 1919. He hired Thomas Lamb to design a 3,500-seat theater on the site, but that theater was never completed. Allied Owners Inc., which was established in 1927 to develop the Kings, Paramount, Pitkin, and Valencia theaters, subsequently acquired the site. The theater became known as the Kings, after its location in Kings County, New York, which is coextensive with Brooklyn. The Famous Players–Lasky Company announced preliminary plans for the theater in March 1927, before the deal with Loew's had been finalized. These plans called for a 3,920-seat theater with a deep stage, a shallow balcony, and five or six stores extending north along Flatbush Avenue to Tilden Avenue.

Paramount-Publix reassigned its leases of the Kings, Pitkin, and Valencia theaters to Loew's in November 1927. For the Kings Theatre's construction, Loew's Inc. agreed to pay Allied Owners Inc. $20,000 a month for 181 months, in exchange for receiving financing from Allied Owners Inc., and Paramount-Publix agreed to guarantee the Kings Theatre's construction. Loew's Inc. was to have taken ownership of the property in 1945, once the bonds had been paid off. Since sound films were becoming prevalent at the time, the Kings Theatre was the first Loew's theater that was designed specifically to accommodate the acoustics of sound films. The Thompson–Starrett Company was the general contractor for the theater, while Leon Fleischmann of Loew's Theaters supervised the theater's construction.

Loew's announced in early 1928 that it would begin constructing four of the theaters, including the theater in Flatbush. Construction began with the demolition of the railyard. Afterward, workers constructed the foundation, steel superstructure, and roof; to speed up construction, workers built the lower and upper portions of the theater concurrently. By early August 1929, decorators were finishing up the interiors. The project cost $1.3 million in total. The Kings Theatre was supposed to have opened on August 24, 1929, but the opening was postponed three times. When the theater was completed, the New York Herald Tribune called it "Brooklyn's largest residential picture house". The theater opened to the public at 11 a.m. on September 7, 1929, and was dedicated that night. The first show was a program that included the film Evangeline, a live stage show, orchestra, and solo pipe organ; the film's star, Dolores del Río, made a special live appearance. When the Kings opened, it was surrounded by at least six other movie theaters.

=== Operation ===
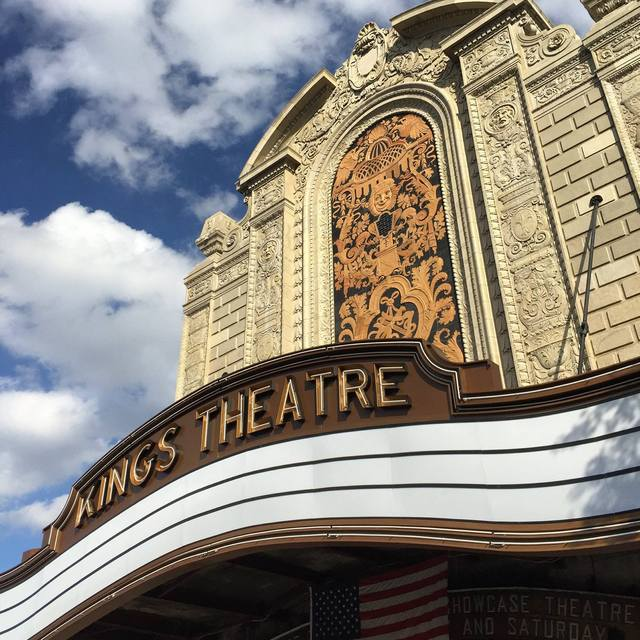
Close-up of the marquee

The Loew's Kings presented first runs of films along with stage shows when it opened. Initially, the Loew's Kings presented stage shows that had already been performed at the Capitol Theatre in Manhattan. In addition to films and stage shows, the Kings Theater hosted events such as beauty pageants, merchandise displays, fundraisers, and awards ceremonies. The theater frequently hosted high-school graduations, as it was one of the few venues in Brooklyn that were large enough to accommodate large student bodies. Among the students who had their graduation ceremonies there were the U.S. senator Chuck Schumer and the musician Carole King. Other activities at the Kings Theatre included Christmas parties for orphans, in addition to contract bridge lessons.

In the theater's early years, the balcony area was so popular that it was often filled to capacity before all the orchestra seats had been occupied. The theater's managers checked the equipment every week. To prevent overcrowding, patrons lined up in the main lobby before each show; the theater's ushers silently led patrons to their seats, one row at a time. The Kings employed 18 ushers, as well as numerous doormen, captains, cashiers, projectionists, janitors, cleaners, engineers, and electricians. The staff over the years included Sylvester Stallone and Henry Winkler, who worked there as ushers. Local legend has it that Barbra Streisand was an usher at the theater as well, though she never worked there; however, Streisand did watch movies at the theater frequently.

During the 1930s, the Kings Theatre's performers included Gracie Allen, Milton Berle, George Burns, Cab Calloway, Jimmy Durante, and Bob Hope. Ben Vereen, whose mother worked at the theater, also danced there. Other celebrities performed at the theater throughout the years, including Chuck Berry, Marlon Brando, Eddie Cantor, Florence Henderson, the Nicholas Brothers, Little Richard, and Bojangles Robinson. In its last two decades as a cinema, the Kings hosted celebrities such as Muhammad Ali, Joan Crawford, Bette Davis, and Olivia de Havilland.

==== 1920s to 1940s ====
Edward Douglas, who had trained more than 3,000 musicians for U.S. military bands, was the theater's first director. The Kings Theatre originally had a 40-piece orchestra, which at the time of the opening was led by a 29-year-old conductor, David Pesetzki. The theater mostly screened movies produced by Metro-Goldwyn-Mayer, a subsidiary of Loew's. In late 1929, Loew's orchestras began playing at alternating theaters, so the Paradise Theatre's orchestra was moved to the Kings Theatre. In 1930, Loew's installed a Trans-tone wide screen at the Kings Theatre. Loew's announced that June that the Kings would no longer host live vaudeville shows during the summer.

Loew's defaulted on the theater's mortgage loan in June 1933, and the Kings' owner, Allied Owners, filed for bankruptcy protection that October. Manufacturers Trust also moved to foreclose on a $9 million mortgage that it had placed on the Kings and four other Allied theaters. Allied Owners subsequently presented a reorganization plan in 1934, and a federal judge approved the plan in March 1935, allowing Allied to transfer ownership of the Kings, Pitkin, and Valencia theaters to Loew's once the debt on these three theaters had been paid off. Allied Owners agreed to sell the three theaters to Loew's for $12,875,000, which would be paid out over 25 years. As part of the agreement, Loew's would pay $500,000 for the first ten years and $525,000 for the next fifteen years. The Kings experimented with double features (in which two films were screened back-to-back) in 1935, but the theater had switched to screening only one film at a time by that October.

By the late 1930s, the Kings no longer presented vaudeville at all, but it still presented some live shows. One of the theater's former ushers recalled that the organ loft and the orchestra pit were no longer being regularly used at the time. Instead, double features were screened for almost 12 hours a day, seven days a week; the theater also screened newsreels and short films. Typically, the double features were followed by a cartoon, a newsreel, a short travel film, and a trailer. During World War II, a nurse-recruitment booth operated in the theater's lobby, and the theater hosted charity balls and war-bond sales along with movies. Following the U.S. Supreme Court's 1948 ruling in United States v. Paramount Pictures, Inc., Loew's Theaters was forced to split up its film-production and film-exhibition divisions. As part of the split, Loew's Theatres was compelled to either sell the Kings Theatre or limit the types of shows that were to be presented there.

==== 1950s to 1970s ====
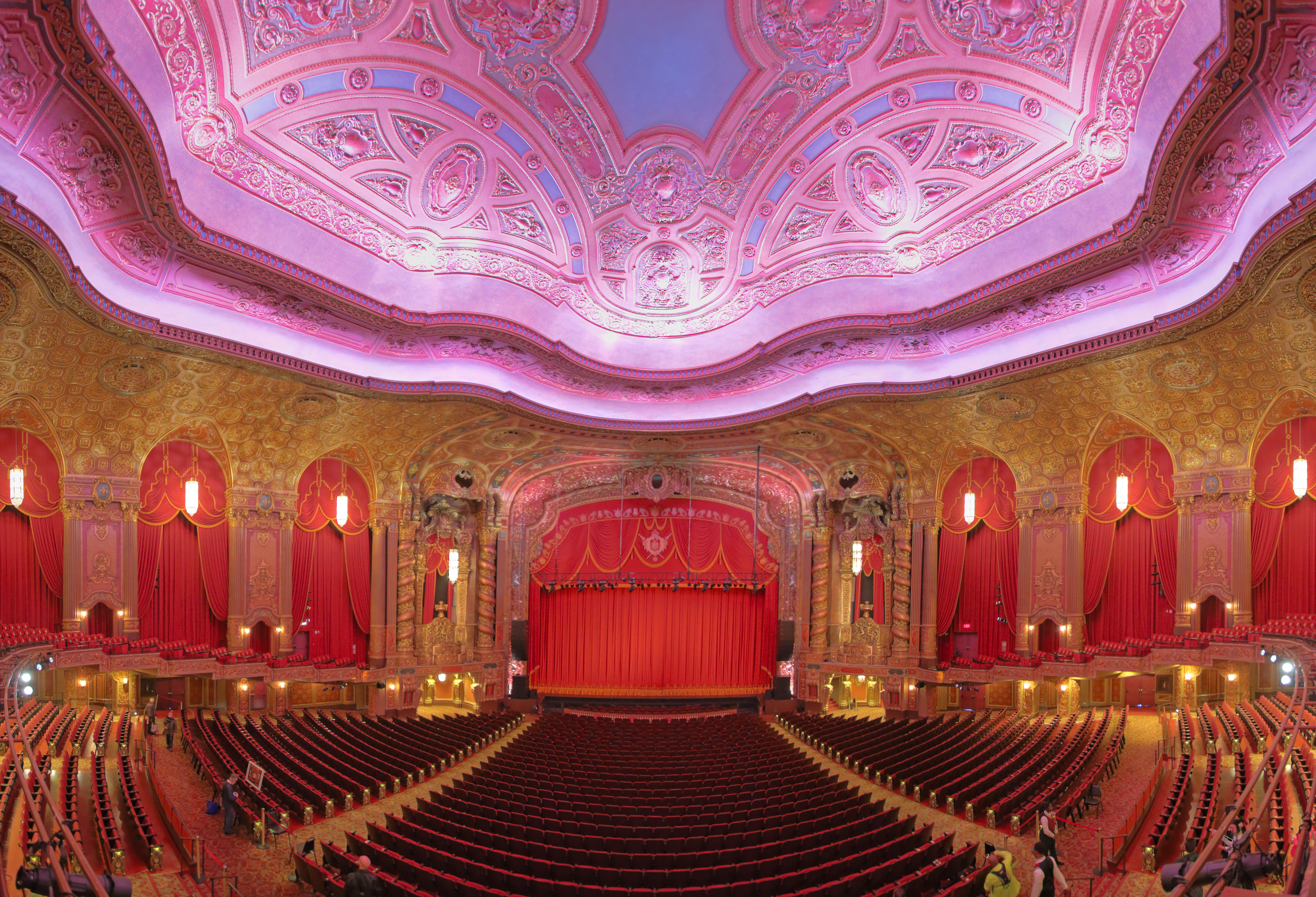
Panoramic view of the auditorium

The Kings Theatre first hosted jazz concerts in 1952; the theater hosted more concerts after the first one opened to generally positive acclaim. The theater slowly declined after World War II, and it screened films almost exclusively. By the 1960s, Loew's Theaters Inc. had begun to struggle financially, and the chain closed some of its larger theaters due to high expenses. In addition, urban residents had begun to move to the suburbs, and neighborhood movie houses had to compete with shopping-mall multiplexes and household televisions. The theater had a single screen, limiting the number of films that could be shown there. The Loew's Kings began hosting events such as a televised boxing match in 1964, and it started screening multiple first-run films the same year as part of the Showcase program. Over the years, the original color palette of the auditorium was obscured due to successive repaintings, in addition to accumulations of soot from cigarette smoke.

The theater's original pipe organ was played for the last time in 1974, after which it was disassembled and relocated. After a tax on theater admission tickets was proposed the next year, the theater's manager Dorothy Panzica wrote letters to four newspapers to protest the proposed surcharge. In its final years, the Kings Theatre showed low-budget films as well as blaxploitation, horror, and kung fu movies. By 1976, community organizer Marty Markowitz of the Flatbush Tenants Council had proposed converting the Kings Theatre to accommodate large stage shows. Markowitz claimed these shows would attract patrons and revitalize Flatbush Avenue.

The Kings Theatre briefly closed in early 1977. The theater was sold to the Kings Royalty Production Corporation that May at a cost of $718,385. The Tabernacle of Prayer for All People, a Brooklyn–based church, negotiated to buy the Loew's Kings, but when these negotiations failed, the church moved to the Loew's Valencia Theatre. The theater reopened in June 1977 and was renamed the Kings Theatre, without the Loew's name. Ultimately, the theater was unable to continue operating due to high costs and low attendance. Unlike other large theaters that were divided into multiplexes, the Kings could not be subdivided, both because the balcony was too narrow and because the orchestra level was too wide. The Kings closed on August 30, 1977; the last films screened there were Islands in the Stream and The Death of Bruce Lee.

== Abandonment and redevelopment ==
=== Redevelopment attempts ===
==== 1970s and 1980s ====
When the Kings Theatre closed, the interior was almost completely intact, and it was maintained by a skeleton crew. Prior to its eventual reopening in 2015, there were at least seven unsuccessful attempts over the years to redevelop the theater. In June 1978, Brooklyn borough president Howard Golden allocated $1.2 million in community development funds for the acquisition of the Kings Theatre. Golden planned to renovate the interior into a cultural center. The planned renovation was part of the Overall Economic Development Program, a wider-ranging development plan for Brooklyn. Another proposal called for the theater to be converted into a roller rink. The Flatbush Development Corporation (FDC) acquired the theater for $780,000 and planned to spend $8 million to $10 million converting the building into a live-events venue. To raise money for the renovation, the FDC hosted a fundraiser at the theater in May 1979; it was the first event to be hosted at the venue in two years. Supporters of the theater's conversion also wanted the building to be designated as an official landmark. At the time, the FDC described the theater as still being in relatively good shape, though some of the theater's artifacts were later sold off.

The city government seized the theater in 1978, after the FDC failed to pay taxes. The FDC continued to maintain the theater with funds from the city. The city wished to spend $2 million on the area, of which $300,000 would go toward acquiring the theater. The city government also contemplated acquiring the land to the east, along East 22nd Street and Tilden Avenue, for a parking lot. The New York City Department of City Planning tentatively approved the plan to renovate the theater and surrounding area in July 1980. The FDC's plans called for the building to be converted into a performing-arts venue with retail, with connections to the neighboring Macy's, Loehmann, and Sears store buildings. Local small-business owners expressed concerns that a new mall centered around the Kings Theatre would harm mom-and-pop stores on Flatbush Avenue and Beverley Road, so the plan to convert the Kings Theatre into a mall was canceled that December. Nonetheless, the New York City Board of Estimate approved the plan in January 1981. By then, the New York Bank for Savings had foreclosed on the theater.

There were rumors in 1982 that the theater was being sold to the entertainer Ben Vereen, though the FDC denied these claims. The FDC continued to pursue the idea of reopening the Kings Theatre either for legitimate shows or as a recording studio. Meanwhile, the empty theater was vandalized, and the interiors continued to decay, with squatters moving into the vacant space. As part of the citywide Adopt-a-Landmark program, students from South Shore High School "adopted" the theater in late 1985, visiting the venue and documenting its history and architecture. The FDC simultaneously commissioned a study, which determined that the theater could be converted either to retail space or an entertainment venue with some retail. After the study was completed, the city government began looking for a developer to renovate the Kings Theatre. A request for proposals was supposed to have been launched in July 1986, but it was delayed when city officials expressed concerns that there was insufficient demand for performing-arts programs at the theater. A consultant for the FDC, Jack Freeman, also drew up plans to convert the theater into a mixed-use building.

In late 1986, a consortium including the FDC, the J. M. Kaplan Fund, and Save the Theatres Inc. announced plans to redevelop the theater into a performing-arts venue. Two Brooklyn residents, Mark Bender and Bruce Friedman, formed an organization known as Save the Kings. The National Park Service determined that the theater was eligible for designation as a U.S. National Historic Landmark, and the New York City Landmarks Preservation Commission also determined that the theater was eligible for city-landmark protection. In addition, the Prospect Park Environmental Center and Municipal Art Society sponsored walking tours of the abandoned Kings Theatre. The city government was still looking to sell the theater by 1988. The next year, city officials provided $200,000 for repairs to the Kings Theatre's roof. The city government tried to close the section of East 22nd Street east of the theater, as part of the redevelopment of the parking lot there, but the street was not closed because of a clerical error.

==== Early and mid-1990s ====
The New York City Economic Development Corporation (EDC) finally issued a request for expressions of interest (RFEI) for the theater in 1990. At that point, the city estimated that it would cost $4.5 million just to bring the theater to a state of good repair, plus several million more dollars to restore the decorations. The city sent out invitations to 170 developers, of which 30 replied. The city government stipulated that the winning bidders had to continue operating the venue as a theater. Golden believed that the theater's renovation would lead to the redevelopment of the Flatbush Avenue shopping district. Workers began repairing the roof in 1991, a project that cost $1.2–1.4 million. Workers also repaired the plumbing and masonry.

By 1991, the city government had identified two viable proposals. The restaurateur and developer Bernard James wanted to convert the theater into a community center for Caribbean-Americans in Brooklyn, while the clothing and real-estate company Jordache wanted to divide the theater into a multiplex. The EDC, which liked both proposals, requested that James and the Nakash brothers (who owned Jordache) submit a joint proposal for the theater. James formed a group known as the Flatbush Universal Corporation to raise money for the theater; among the fundraisers it hosted was a 1992 concert in Atlantic City, New Jersey, with Queen Latifah and Fela Kuti. James said at the time that the building would include a hotel, health spa, restaurant, catering hall, and wax museum dedicated to the black community, along with a restored 3,200-seat auditorium. These plans ultimately never materialized.

==== Late 1990s and 2000s ====
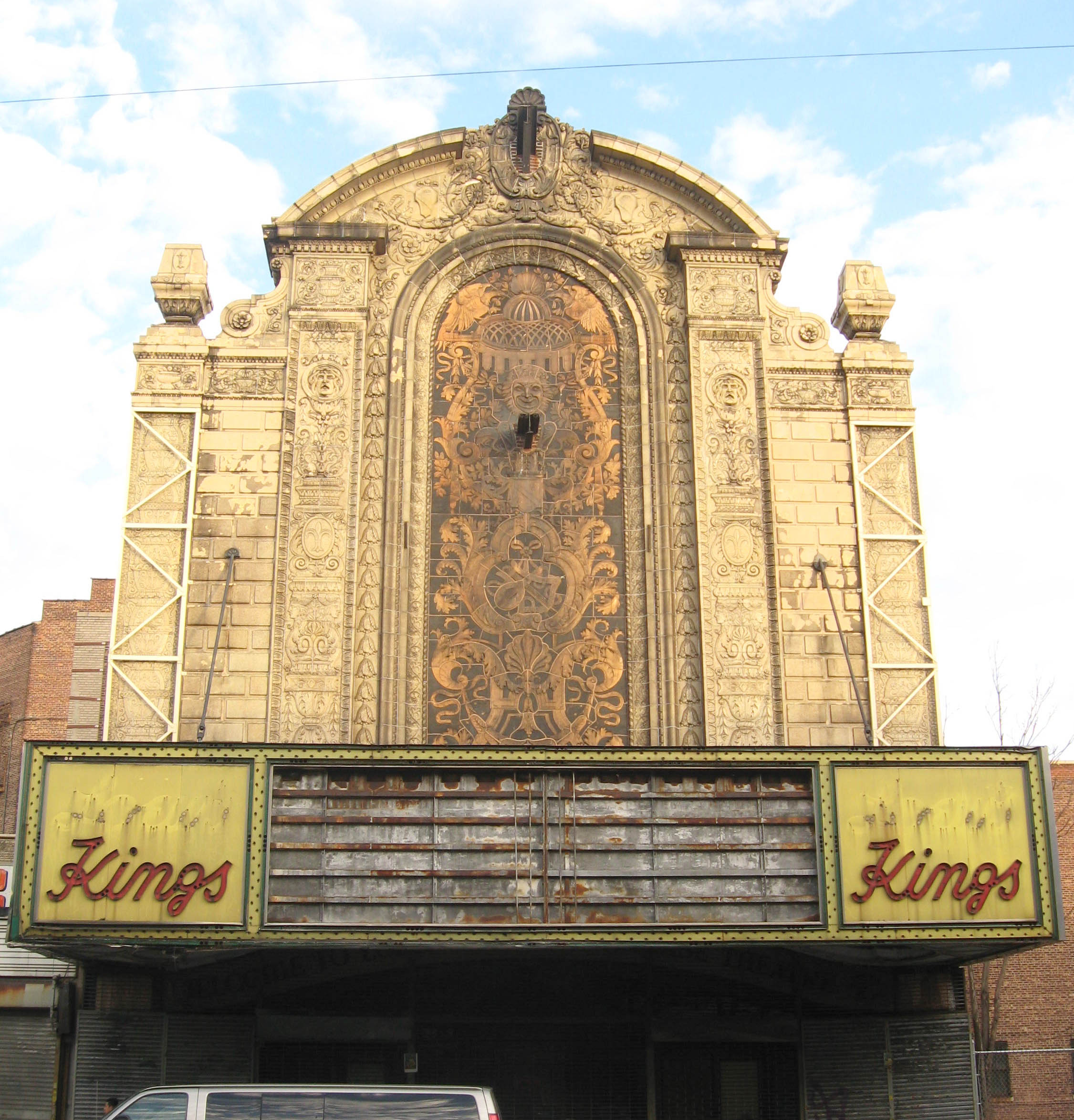
The abandoned theater in 2008

The city government again requested new proposals for the Kings Theatre's renovation in late 1996. By then, the adjacent section of Flatbush Avenue was already undergoing a commercial redevelopment. Because the theater had never officially been designated as a landmark, developers were potentially allowed to demolish it. Golden, who was still Brooklyn's borough president, endorsed the theater's renovation, while Bruce Friedman of Save the Kings suggested that the Kings Theatre could be redeveloped as a mixed-use complex, similarly to the New Amsterdam Theatre in Manhattan. Only one developer, Bruce Ratner, had expressed serious interest in the Kings Theatre site by mid-1997, but the EDC rejected his request that he unilaterally be appointed as the theater's developer.

Magic Johnson Theatres, operated by the retired basketball player Magic Johnson, submitted a bid to redevelop the Kings Theatre in early 1998. The plans entailed dividing the theater into a multiplex and constructing a restaurant there. Other companies, including United Artists, also submitted bids for the theater's renovation. Though the city government favored Johnson's plan, it debated whether to give the developer $5 million in financing for the theater's renovation. The city government selected Johnson and the Plaza Construction Corporation as the Kings Theatre's developers in 1999. Johnson planned to construct a 12-screen multiplex there at a cost of $30 million, of which the city government was to provide $2.5 million. About 175 people would have been hired to renovate the theater, and the completed theater would have employed 100 workers. Johnson was to have started renovating the theater in late 1999, but the renovation still had not begun by October 2000, in part because of financing difficulties. Johnson's renovation was never completed, either.

The theater remained abandoned through the 2000s while groups, such as the Theatre Historical Society of America, gave tours of the venue. By the mid-2000s, the cost of restoring the Kings Theatre had increased to $35 million, and city officials considered demolishing the interior. The EDC launched yet another RFEI for the theater in September 2006, giving tours to potential developers. By then, the Kings' interior was damaged as a result of neglect, water damage, and vandalism, and there was toxic asbestos, lead, and mold inside. Matthew Wolf, who later became the Kings' manager, recalled that the northwest corner of the roof had partially collapsed. The roof was repaired again in 2007 to halt further deterioration. The next year, the city government issued an RFP for the theater's renovation, which was to cost $70 million. Bidders for the theater had the option to lease the adjacent parking lots as well. Marty Markowitz, who was by then the borough president, endorsed the project, saying a live-event venue in the old theater would boost Flatbush's economy. Markowitz obtained $10.75 million for the theater's renovation from the city government's budget for fiscal year 2009.

=== Renovation ===
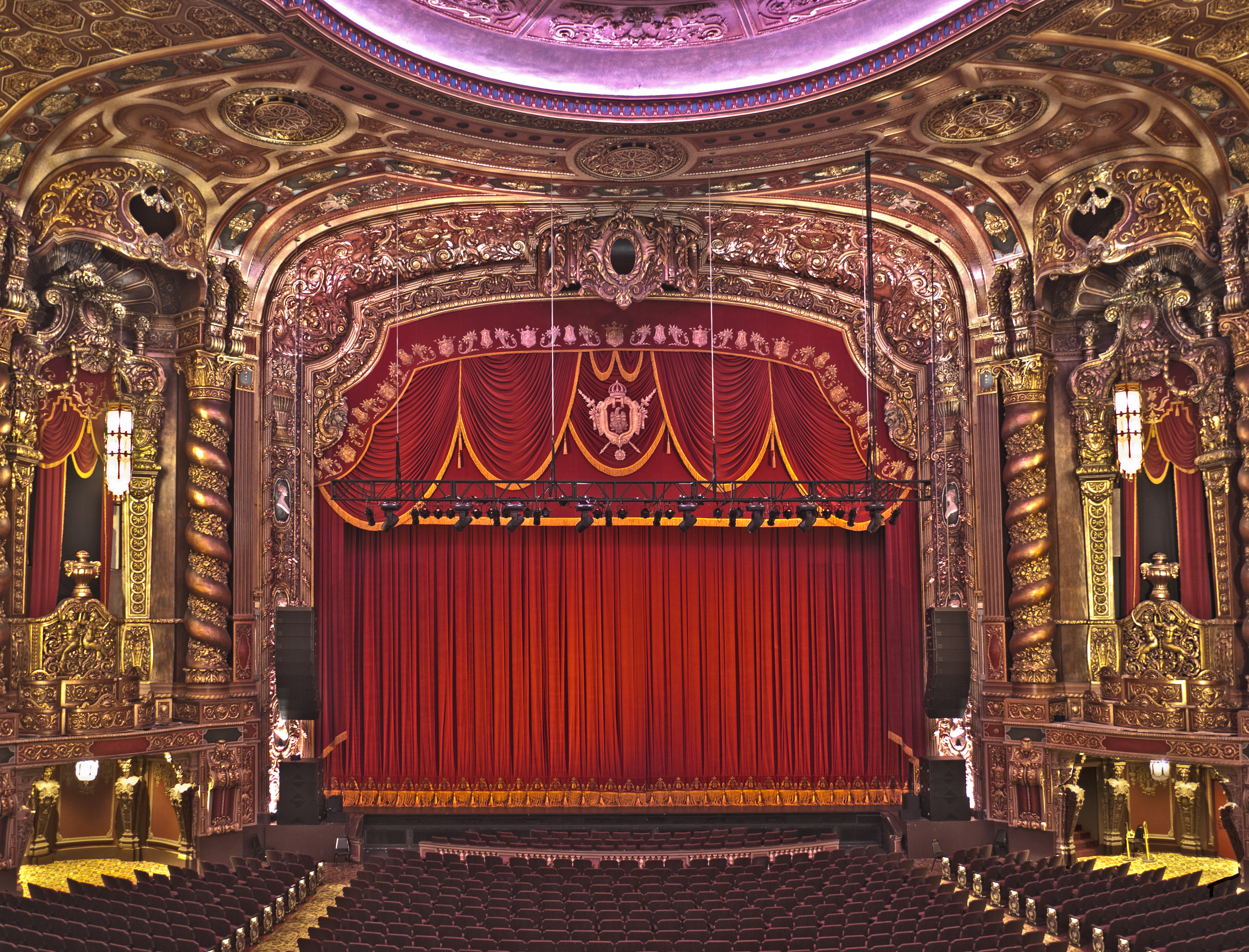
The renovated interior

Planning for the renovation began in 2009. The government of New York City announced in February 2010 that it had selected the Houston–based ACE Theatrical Group to redevelop the theater for $70 million. ACE had previously redeveloped other historic theaters across the United States and converted them into live events venues. The city government agreed to provide $50 million, while ACE spent $5 million; the remaining $15 million came from tax credits. The theater's renovation was overseen by a joint venture of the ACE Theatrical Group, Goldman Sachs Urban Investment Group, and National Development Council. At the time, ACE planned to host 250 events at the theater annually, including concerts, performances, and ceremonies. Martinez & Johnson were hired to design the restoration. Before the renovations commenced, workers surveyed the interiors; they reportedly found a naked vagrant on the stage during their surveys. The theater had also decayed significantly due to further deterioration of the roof since the late 2000s. One side of the auditorium had been nearly destroyed by water infiltration, there were feral cats and birds, and the theater had been targeted by looters.

The theater was added to the National Register of Historic Places in 2012, allowing the developers to receive a preservation tax credit. The same year, ACE and its partners agreed to lease the theater from the EDC for 55 years. Work formally began on January 23, 2013. By then, the cost had increased to $94 million, of which Goldman Sachs and United Fund Advisors agreed to provide $44 million. The renovation was expected to employ 500 workers, while the theater itself was to have 50 workers after the renovation was finished. Workers began environmental remediation of the site, and they installed a new roof above the Kings Theatre. The theater building was upgraded to meet modern building codes, and new lights were installed. The stage house at the theater's rear was expanded onto East 22nd Street. The rake of the auditorium seats was modified to improve sightlines, and the auditorium was downsized to 3,250 seats. Bars were added to the theater, and the basement was enlarged as well. ACE spent over $75,000 to restore the original lobby furniture, which the theater's former manager Dorothy Panzica still owned after four decades, and it also hired a Connecticut–based firm to build additional furniture.

The theater's interior spaces were restored to their original appearance. EverGreene Architectural Arts was hired to restore the theater's original architectural features. Because almost all of the decorations had been stolen or damaged over the years, EverGreene had to reproduce many of the decorations; they took dozens of material samples to determine the original colors and interior finishes. The deteriorating interiors were repaired and cleaned, while the facade and marquee were restored. The chandeliers in the lobbies, which were among the few remaining interior decorations, were rebuilt. The restoration process was so complex that scaffolds had to be piled on top of other scaffolds, and the scaffolding costs alone amounted to over $2 million. Restoration work in the auditorium and lobby was nearly complete by late 2014. The renovation ultimately cost $95 million, of which more than half came from city and state government sources. (Note: A 2014 New York Times article says that the theater received $55.5 million in public funding, broken down into $20.5 million in mayoral funds, $1.5 million in City Council funds, $30.5 million in borough president funds, and $3 million in state funds. According to the Times, the project also received $39.9 million in private funding, including $21.6 million from Goldman Sachs and $18.3 million from ACE. The New York Daily News wrote that the Dormitory Authority of the State of New York provided a grant for the theater.)

=== Reopening ===
ACE began hiring staff for the theater in late 2014, and Diana Ross was selected as the inaugural artist for the theater's reopening. The theater formally reopened on January 23, 2015, and Ross gave a gala reopening performance on February 3. In addition to performances, the theater hosted community events and tours when it reopened. Matthew Wolf was hired as the theater's executive director. Markowitz, who had become a NYC & Company vice president after leaving office as Brooklyn's borough president, predicted that the Kings Theatre would become "Brooklyn's Beacon and Apollo theaters all in one". Proponents of the Kings Theatre's renovation hoped that the theater would benefit the neighborhood's economy. The renovation coincided with the development of several stores, a gym, and a hotel in the surrounding area, Several restaurants opened on Beverley Road, where the closest New York City Subway stations to the theater were located. A municipal panel in Jersey City, New Jersey, decided to hire ACE to redevelop the Loew's Jersey Theatre in part because of the group's work on the Kings Theatre.

After the theater reopened, it hosted performances from musical acts including Jackson Browne, Josh Groban, Diana Ross, and Yo La Tengo, in addition to events like the National Beard & Moustache Championships. The theater's new management employed mostly neighborhood residents, and they also collaborated with local businesses. The New York Landmarks Conservancy gave the theater its Lucy G. Moses Preservation Award, recognizing the historic preservation of the theater, in 2015. That September, the Ambassador Theatre Group (ATG) acquired ACE's theaters, including the Kings Theatre. After Tyler Bates took over as the Kings Theatre's general manager in 2017, he added 50% more event bookings to the theater in an attempt to attract more visitors from the local community.

Billboard magazine wrote in 2018 that the theater had become a well-known live-event venue in the New York metropolitan area. In addition to music concerts, the theater hosted events catering to Brooklyn's many demographic groups, as well as other events like boxing matches, family shows, and comedy shows. The theater was also used for private events like meetings and graduation ceremonies. The Kings Theatre was temporarily shuttered during 2020 during the COVID-19 pandemic in New York City. ATG again began hosting tours of the Kings Theatre's interior in 2023.

== Impact ==
=== Critical reception ===
When the theater opened, the Brooklyn Eagle wrote that "luxury seems to have been the watchword of the designers, and this is emphasized from the front door to the very last seat in the balcony". The Brooklyn Daily Times described the Kings Theatre as "one of the most beautiful theatres anywhere in the Metropolitan city", and The Chat described the theater as "the most gorgeous blending of Old World decorative beauty and modern comfort that film theatre architecture has yet produced". The New York Herald Tribune wrote in 1942 that the construction of movie houses such as the Kings, Paradise, Pitkin, and Valencia theaters "marked a new development in neighborhood entertainment", as these venues were much larger than contemporary neighborhood movie theaters. Crain's New York wrote retrospectively that the theater had been intended to "make the common person feel like royalty", while Vulture said that the theater was a "gaudily secular cathedral of American excess".

A reporter for The New York Times wrote in 1976 that the Kings Theatre was "considered by many to be a classic among movie palaces bristling with ornamentation". After the theater closed, one writer the New York Daily News described it as "mayhap Early Texaco in decor but a seeming Sistine Chapel of class to unemployed showbiz buffs", while another reporter for the same paper described it as the Versailles of movie palaces. A New Yorker article described the Kings Theatre as "perhaps the single most ornate movie house in the country". In 2013, The Wall Street Journal described the Kings as one of several New York City–area movie theaters with "exteriors that loom large".

=== Media and exhibits ===
When the theater stopped operating as a movie palace, the director Christian Blackwood produced a documentary called Memoirs of a Movie Palace: Kings of Flatbush, (Note: For the film, see Blackwood Productions (January 14, 2022). "Memoirs of a Movie Palace". Internet Archive.) which was released in 1979. The documentary includes interviews from several of the theater's longtime employees. By early 1980, two separate groups of filmmakers considered using the Kings Theatre as a filming location for the movie Tribute, and for a film based on Herman Wouk's novel The Winds of War. The abandoned theater was used as a filming location for the movie Sophie's Choice in 1982; however, the scene shot at the theater was removed from the film. Scenes from TV series such as So You Think You Can Dance, Gotham, and The Blacklist have also been shot there.

Architectural drawings of the theater's interior were shown in a 1983 exhibit at the Municipal Art Society. After the National Trust for Historic Preservation gave the Municipal Art Society a $1,250 matching grant to fund an exhibit of photographs and artifacts related to the Kings Theatre, the society hosted another exhibit about the theater in 1988. In addition, the Museum of the Moving Image hosted an exhibition about the Loew's Kings and other Loew's theaters in 2004. The photographer Matt Lambros took pictures of the theater for his book After the Final Curtain in the early 2010s. Lambros and the Theatre Historical Society of America published a book about the theater, Kings Theater: The Rise, Fall and Rebirth of Brooklyn's Wonder Theater, in 2015.

== See also ==
- National Register of Historic Places listings in Brooklyn
