= Briolette of India =

Colorless diamond found in India

- Weight: 90.38 carats (18.076 g)
- Color: D (colorless)
- Cut: briolette
- Country of origin: India
- Mine of origin: India
- Original owner: The earliest reported owner is Eleanor of Aquitaine
- Owner: Heidi Horten
- Estimated value: US $7 million (2023)

The Briolette of India is a colorless diamond (weighing 90.38 carats (18.076 g)) that was found in India. It is cut in a briolette shape, and is a D-coloured (colourless) type IIa diamond. Its history was thought to date from the 12th century, when it was first acquired by Eleanor of Aquitaine, the Queen consort of King Louis VII of France between 1137 and 1152. This makes the Briolette of India the oldest diamond on record in the world, even older than the famous Koh-i-Noor.

The diamond was in the possession of several famous historical figures such as King Richard the Lionheart, who carried it with him to the Third Crusade, and King Henry II of France who presented it to his mistress Diane de Poitiers.

The Briolette of India has disappeared from records for long periods, sometimes even for several centuries, before resurfacing again. It was last owned by Austrian heiress Heidi Horten, until auctioned by Christie's in June 2023 where it sold for 6.6 million Swiss Francs. Its current ownership has not been publicly stated.

== Early history ==
Modern reports of the diamond's history speculate that it dates to the 12th century, when it is said to have first been acquired and brought to England by Eleanor of Aquitaine, the queen consort of King Louis VII of France. If Eleanor of Acquitaine did come into possession of the diamond, it was probably between 1137 and 1152, which would make the Briolette of India the oldest diamond on record. After her marriage to the King of France was dissolved, Eleanor married Henry II of England, to whom she bore eight children including Richard I of England (Richard the Lionheart) who is said to have later acquired the diamond. Modern sources speculate that King Richard I carried the Briolette of India with him when he took part in the Third Crusade.

The diamond's history was not recorded for almost three centuries after it passed from Richard I's possession. Modern sources resume the story of the diamond from the late 16th century, when Henry II of France is said to have presented it to his mistress, Diane de Poitiers. After Henry II's death, his queen consort, Catherine de Medicis, forced Poitiers to surrender the diamond as well as other jewels given her by the monarch. The jewels that were surrendered may have included the Briolette of India.

== The diamond in the 20th century ==
According to historian Hans Nadelhoffer, the Briolette of India was cut into its distinctive shape in Neuilly, Paris and sold to Cartier, along with another diamond called the Blue Heart (a.k.a. Unzue Heart). "Initially set as a pendant with a 126-grain pearl," Nadelhoffer writes, "the splendid stone was combined the following year [1910] with two 22-carat emeralds and the same pearl to form a brooch, which was sent to the New York branch [of Cartier]. In 1911, Cartier's sold it to [American financier] George Blumenthal", who presented it to his wife, Florence Meyer Blumenthal.

The Briolette resurfaced in 1950, when it was acquired by New York jeweler Harry Winston. Winston sold the diamond to the wife of Canadian millionaire I. W. Killam and bought it back from Dorothy J. Killam's estate ten years later, after her death.

In July 1967, the Briolette of India was illustrated in a photograph by Richard Avedon. The image depicts Anglo-American fashion model Penelope Tree holding the unset stone before her right eye.

Harry Winston exhibited the Briolette in 1970 at a dinner organized for American fashion editors. A year later the firm sold it to a European client.

== Today ==
The diamond was bought by Austrian billionaire collector Heidi Horten, who died in 2022. The diamond was sold at auction by Christie's in June 2023, fetching $7 million, below its estimate.

== Characteristics ==
The Briolette of India is a colourless (D-coloured), clear diamond. It is cut in a briolette shape, an exaggerated form of double rose cut. The diamond weighs 90.38 carats (18.076 g). It is D-color and a type IIa diamond, which are the purest type of diamonds with no chemical impurities or plastic deformations in the crystal. Because of its pureness, it is even known as the "purest of the pure". When last seen, the diamond was being used as the pendant of a necklace, along with another diamond and a large pearl.

== See also ==
- List of diamonds
