= Pendeloque =

A pendeloque, from French pendeloque, is a hanging often drop- or pear-shaped object or pendant used as an ornamentation, such as drop-shaped pendant earrings, and specific pear- and drop-shaped parts of chandeliers. The term is also used in describing the specific pendeloque cut for gemstone cutting.

== Gallery ==
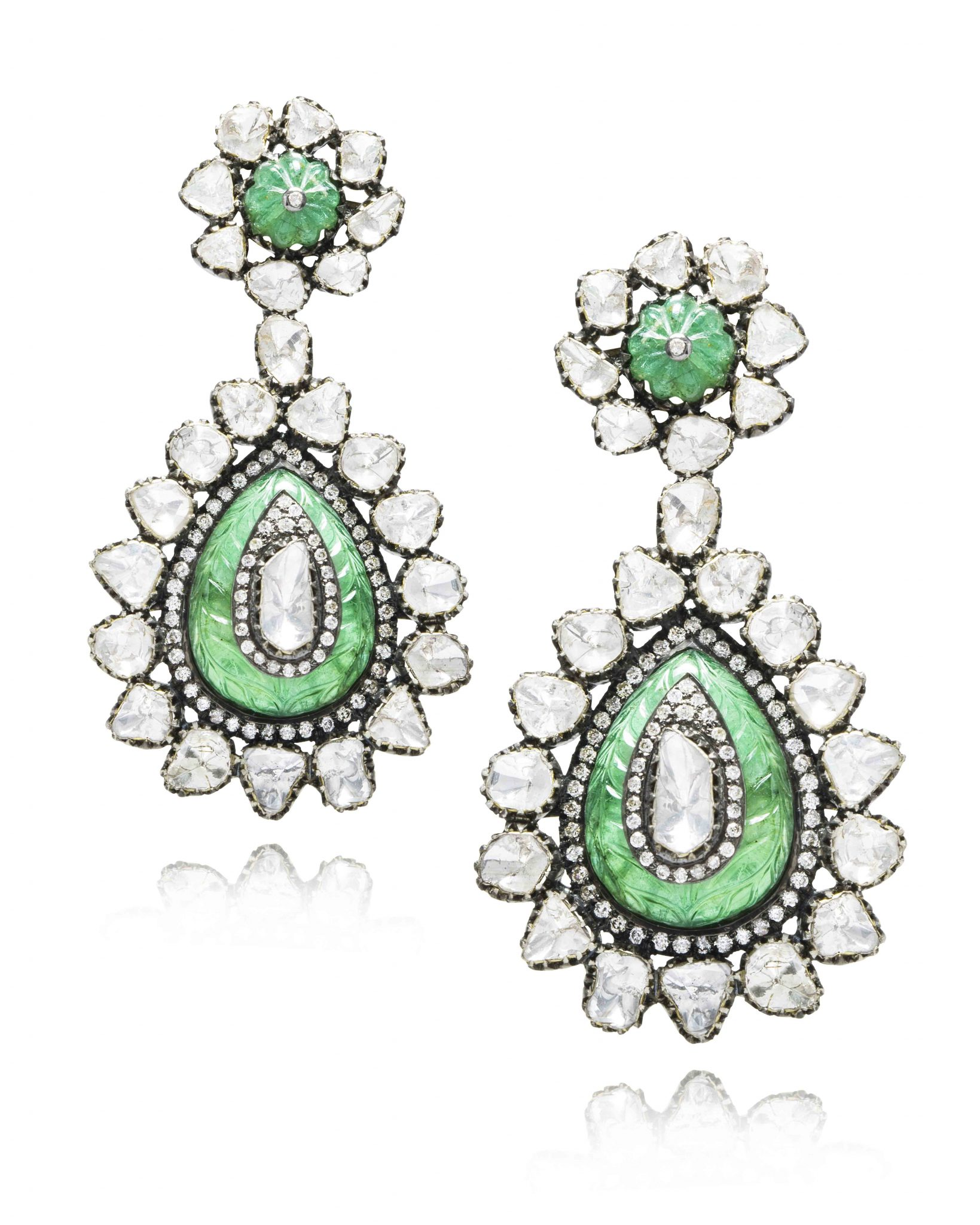
Pendeloque-shaped earrings.

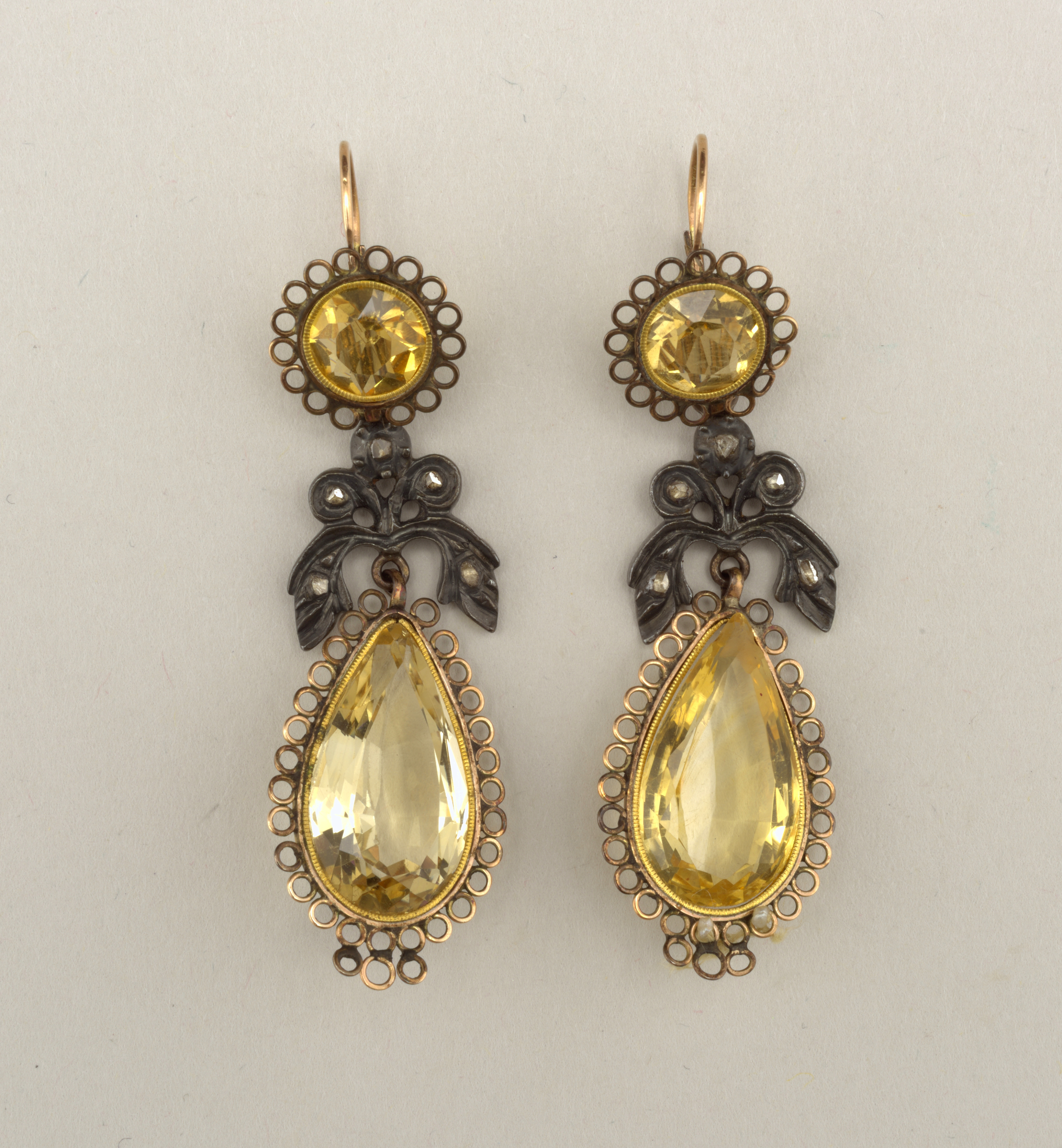
Pendeloque-shaped earrings, with pendeloque cut yellow topazes and small rose cut diamonds.

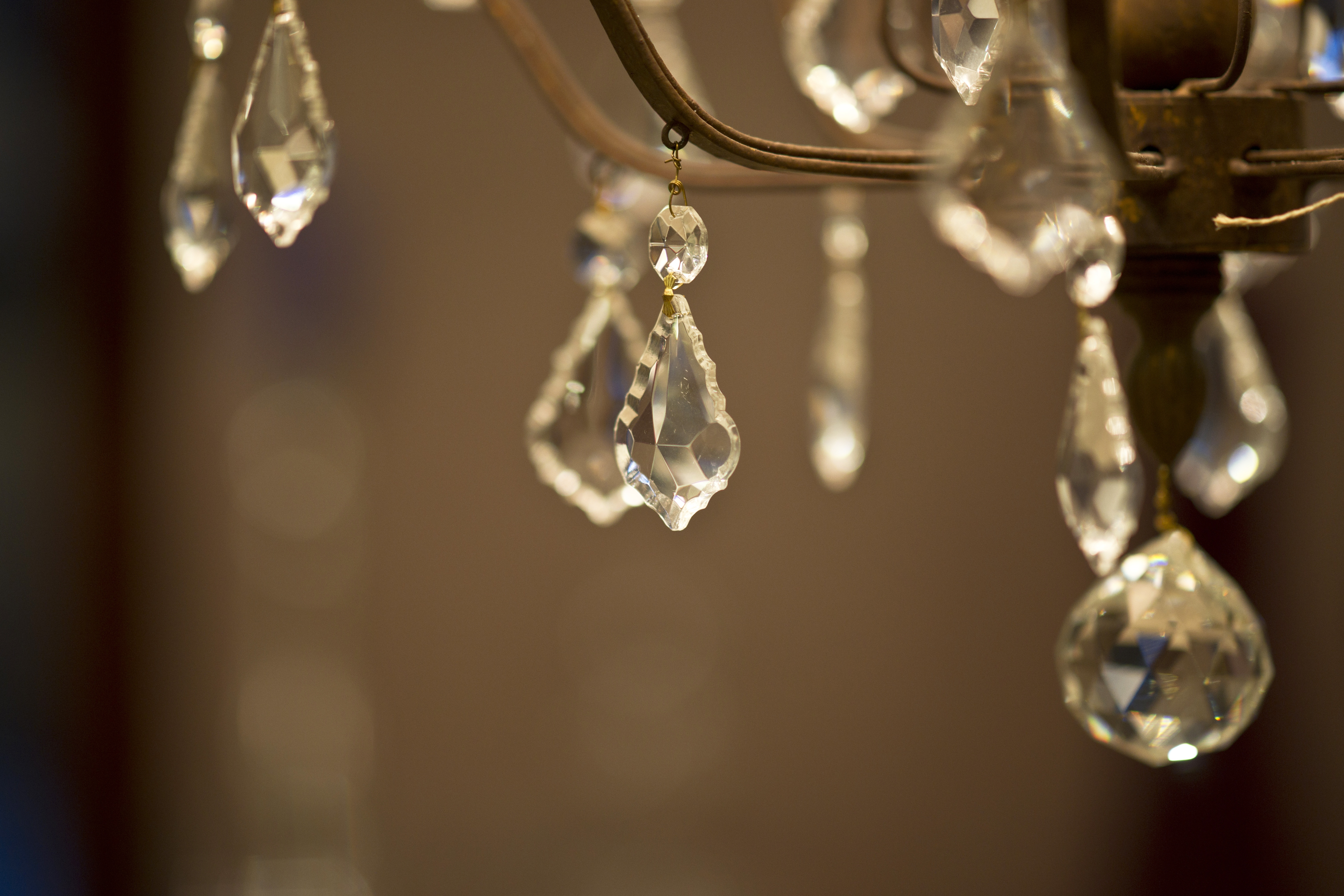
Leaf-shaped pendeloque prisms on a chandelier.

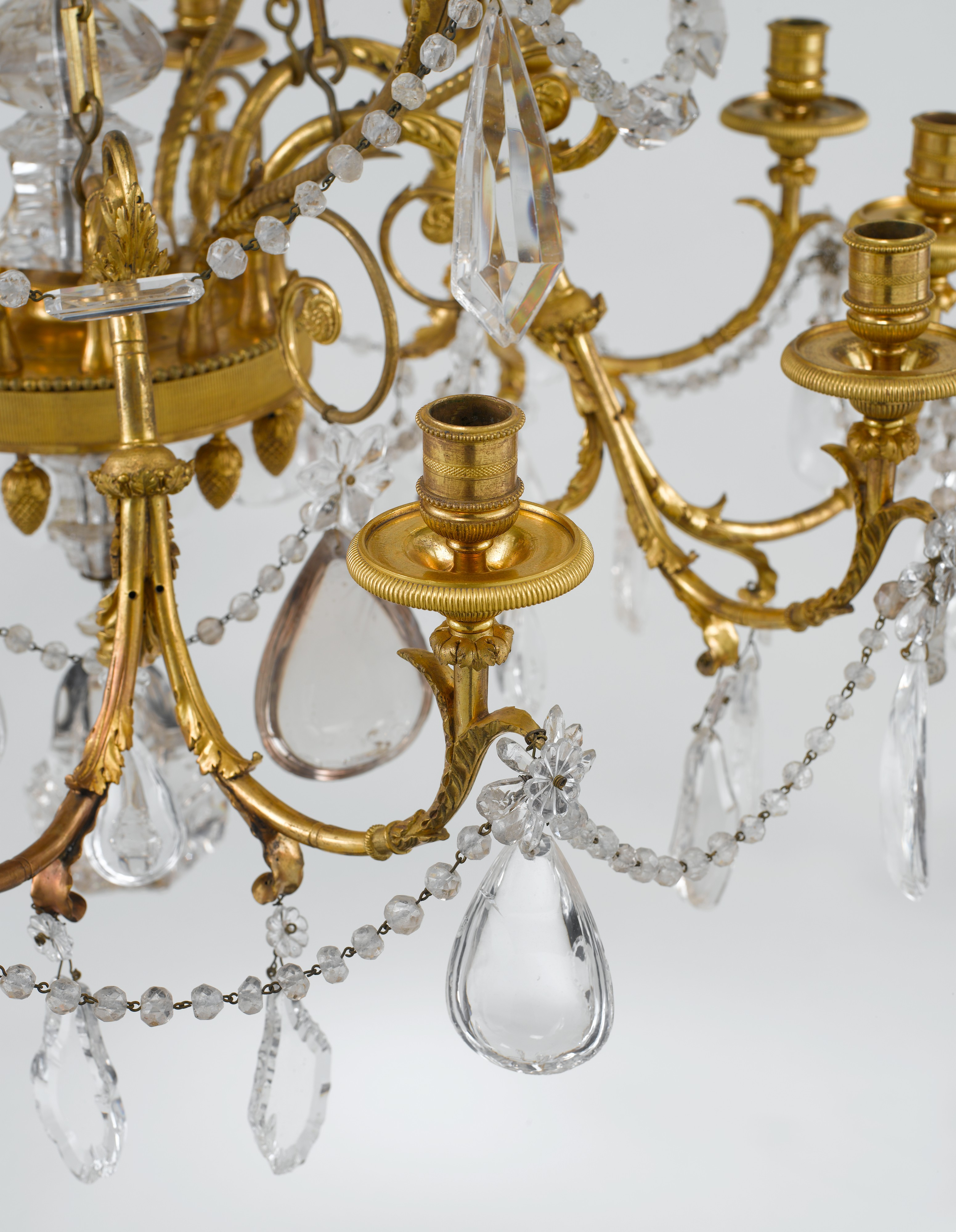
Drop-shaped pendeloque prisms on a chandelier.

== See also ==
- Briolette
