= Pendeloque cut =

Type of cut used on gemstones

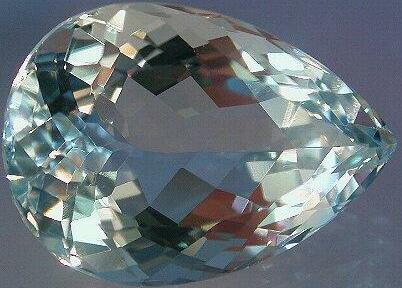
An aquamarine with a pendeloque cut

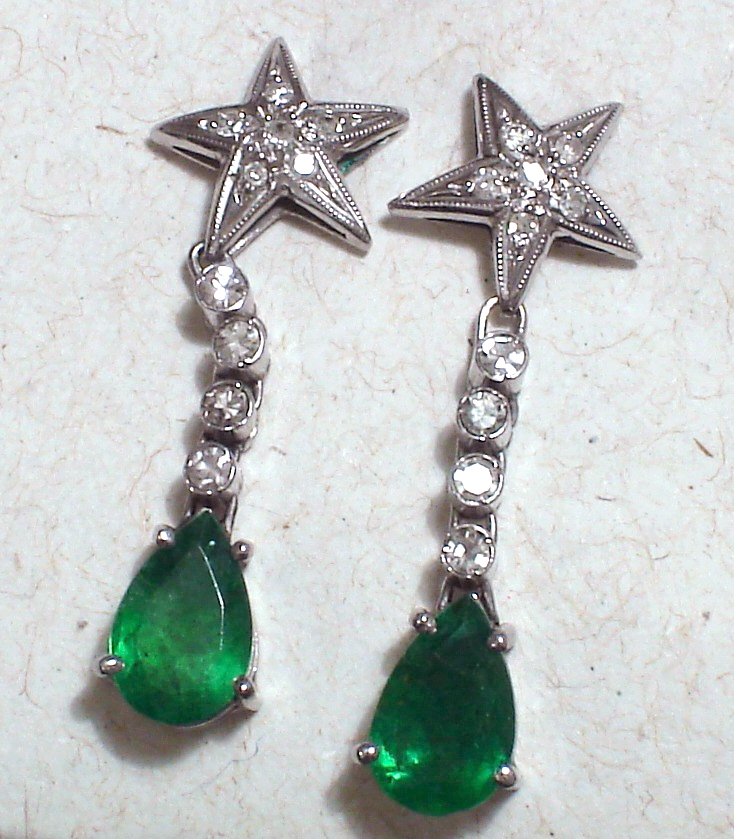
A pair of diamond earrings with pendeloque cut emeralds in prong settings.

A pendeloque cut or pear cut, is a pear-shaped modification of the round brilliant cut used for diamonds and other gemstones. The pendeloque cut is sometimes erroneously called briolette cut, another drop-shaped cutting design. While the briolette is a symmetrical drop shape, the pendeloque cut is flatter and has two different sides: one with a large table facet and one with a point or ridge. The top of a briolette is attached to the piece of jewelry, usually by a hole drilled in the stone, and a pendeloque cut stone needs to be mounted in a prong setting. The pendeloque is one of the drop cuts for gemstones.

The Smithsonian Institution has a 275-carat (55.0 g) diamond pendeloque and briolette necklace presented by Napoleon Bonaparte in 1811 to his Empress consort Marie Louise.

== See also ==
- Briolette
- Cut (gems)
- Pendeloque
