= Briolette =

Style of gemstone cut

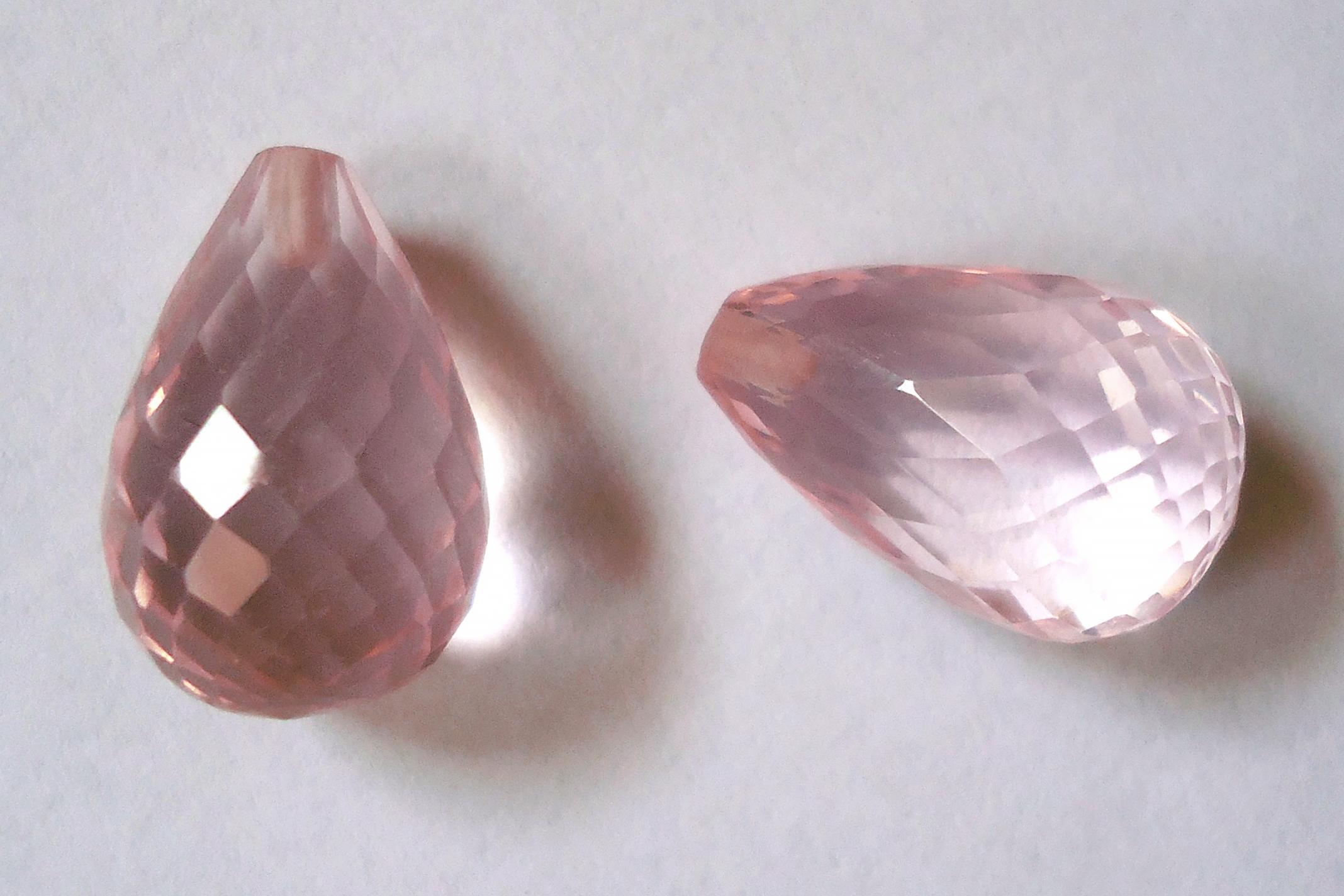
Close-up of briolette cut rose quartz

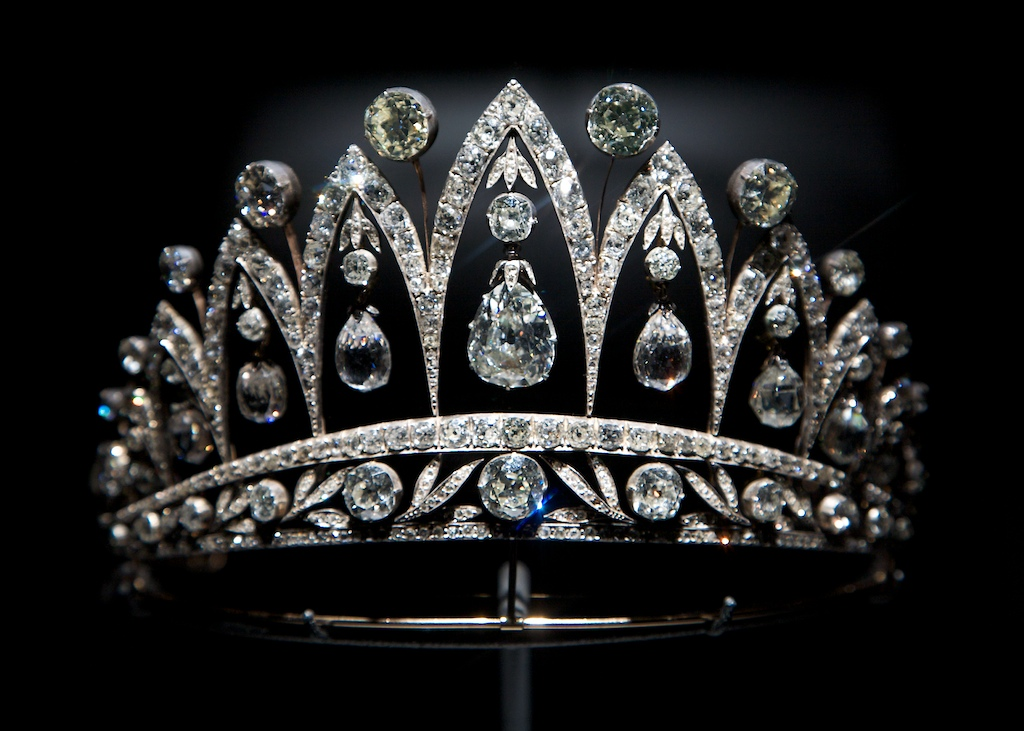
Briolette-cut diamonds dangle in the tiara of Empress Joséphine

A briolette is a style of gemstone cut. It is an elongated, mostly symmetrical along the main axis, pear shape covered with angular facets usually with a pointed end and no girdle. It is often drilled to hang as a bead. The name is also sometimes erroneously used for pendeloque cut gems. While the briolette is a symmetrical drop shape, the pendeloque cut is flatter and has two different sides: one with a large table facet and one with a point or ridge. The top of a briolette is attached to the piece of jewelry, usually by a hole drilled in the stone, and a pendeloque cut stone needs to be mounted in a prong setting. The briolette is one of the drop cuts for gemstones.

The briolette cut is said to have been designed by Belgian Lodewyk van Bercken in 1476. This cut requires a more advanced technique than the round cuts, like the brilliant cut, and results in a much larger loss of the original stone's weight, making briolettes very rare and expensive. The cut is mostly used for stones with color, like sapphires and varieties of quartz. It is rarely used for diamonds. The style was popular during the Victorian era.

== See also ==
- Briolette of India
- Pendeloque cut
