= Prong setting =

Gemstone mount in jewelry

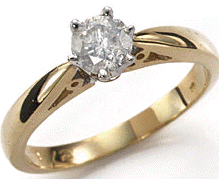
A prong set diamond in a gold ring.

Prong setting or prong mount refers to the use of metal projections or tines, called "prongs", to secure a gemstone to a piece of jewelry. A prong setting is one component of what is known to jewelers as a head, a claw-shaped type of binding (typically three, four, or six individual prongs per head) that is welded or soldered to a jewelry item to mount (or "set") a gemstone to the jewelry item. A common setting for diamond engagement rings, the prong setting allows light to strike a gemstone from more angles, increasing its brilliance.

Prong-setting engagement rings are sometimes referred to as Tiffany setting rings, although this is a trademarked term specifically used to describe prong setting rings sold by Tiffany & Co. A 2017, $19 million lawsuit confirmed the exclusive right of Tiffany & Co. to use the term "Tiffany" within the jewelry sales industry. The judgment was eventually overturned, and the parties made a confidential settlement.

== Characteristics ==
=== General features ===
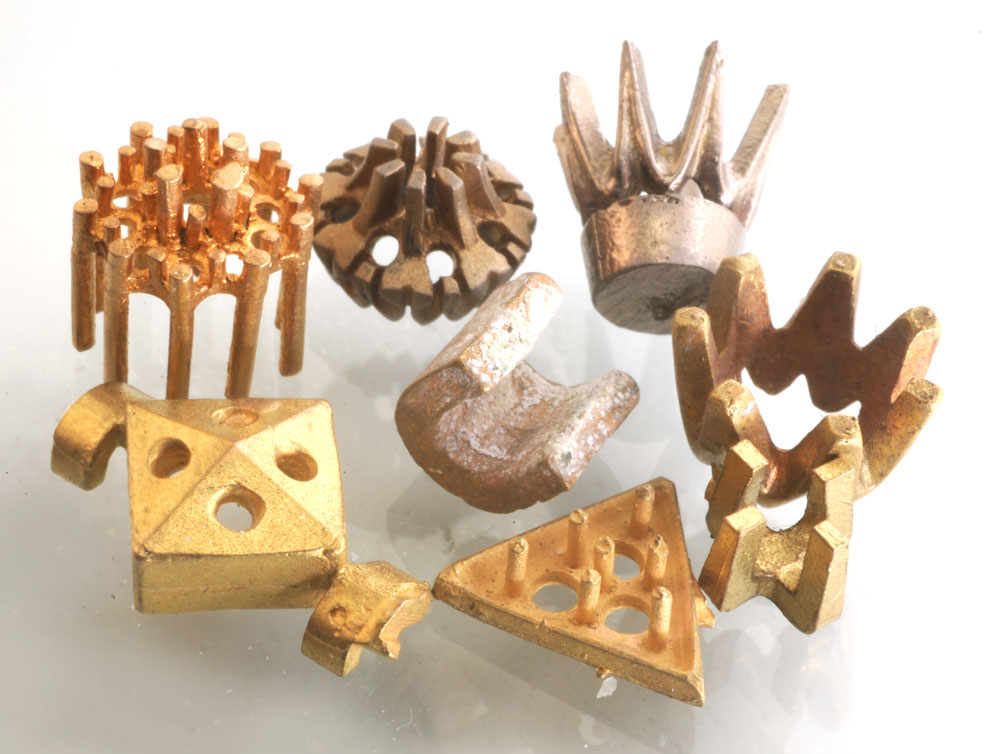
Prefabricated prong settings for stones, to be attached to jewelry.

The head can be handmade, cast, or die struck, and it is made from some type of precious metal, such as gold, silver, or platinum. Heads used to prong set a gemstone are made in a variety of sizes and shapes, depending on the shape and size of the gemstone, or whether or not the gemstone is faceted or cabochon-shaped. Common shapes of heads used in stone setting include round, oval, emerald cut, princess cut, marquise cut, pendeloque cut, and trilliant cut. V-shaped prongs are recommended for a marquise-cut or pendeloque-cut stone, while flat prongs are recommended for a flat-cut emerald. A prong setting holds the gem securely while allowing the gem to be struck with more light and from more angles, increasing the brilliance of the gemstone.

=== Drawbacks ===
A prong setting offers less protection to the gem than inset mounts. In addition, prongs can snag on clothing or fabric. High-quality settings are less likely to snag on clothing, as the prongs are firmly attached to the gem and well finished.

Over time, prongs may get worn out or become loose. Getting the ring checked regularly is a good idea to prevent any accidental loss of a mounted gemstone. Some effective ways include using a 10X loupe to check for gaps between prongs and gemstone, listening for sounds made by loose gemstone, and taking it to a professional jeweler once every six months for checks.

== Tiffany design and trademark ==
One well-known prong setting is the "Tiffany setting", a trademarked engagement ring design created by Charles Tiffany in the 1880s that has become the signature line of Tiffany & Co. engagement rings. The Tiffany setting popularized the general use of prong-setting engagement rings, and as of 2012, the trade association Jewelers of America reports that multiprong solitare rings are the most sought-after form of engagement ring available.

While some in the jewelry industry use the term "Tiffany setting" to describe multiprong solitaire rings, the Tiffany setting is a specific trademarked design of Tiffany & Co. In February 2013, Tiffany & Co. filed a trademark infringement lawsuit against Costco Wholesale Corp. over Costco's practice of selling prong-setting engagement rings described as "Tiffany setting" rings. The lawsuit alleged that Costco was unlawfully using the "Tiffany" trademark to describe products that were not made or licensed by Tiffany & Co. In its defense, Costco asserted that it did not infringe because the terms "Tiffany" and "Tiffany setting" were genericized by common usage to describe prong-setting engagement ring.

On September 8, 2015, a federal judge ruled in favor of Tiffany & Co., rejecting Costco's generic-use argument and finding that Costco's usage of the "Tiffany" name violated Tiffany & Co.'s trademark rights. However, in August 2020, a court of appeals in New York tossed out that judgement and sided with Costco, sending the case back down to the trial court.

On July 19, 2021, Tiffany and Costco settled their dispute with no details being offered.
