= Cut (gems) =

Shaping a gemstone for use in jewelry

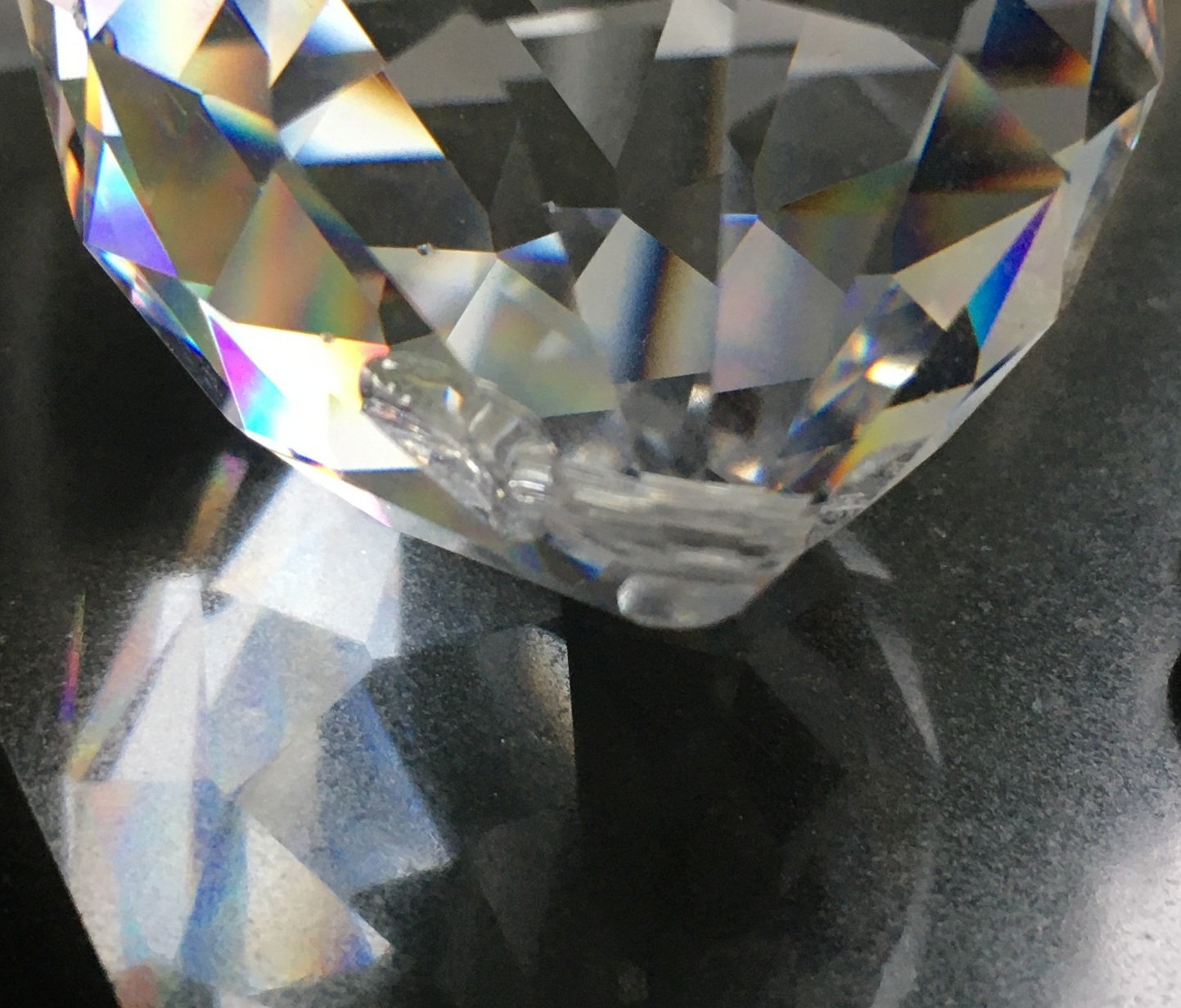
A decorative glass crystal about 4 cm (1.6 in) in diameter, having a facet cut often applied for gemstones. At some positions, coloured light (see rainbow colouring) can be seen, caused by the intended optical prism effect of the cut.

A gemstone desired to be used in jewelry is cut, carved or made into a bead. The best quality rough is cut, also often referred to as faceting. This is done by a lapidary who decides how to reshape the gemstone using knowledge of the refractive index of gemstones to maximise any particular crystal's colour or play of light. As a general rule, a cut gemstone will be reduced in mass by about 50%.

Among the several techniques used to work with gemstones are sawing, grinding, sanding, lapping, polishing, grilling, and tumbling. The diamond cut planning stage is a complex process that requires the cutter to work with unique rough stones. Very often, the location of the inclusions in a rough stone will determine the type of shape to which a diamond may be cut. For economic reasons, most diamonds are cut to retain weight instead of maximizing brilliance. How diamonds have been cut has evolved over time largely to technological advances.

== Types ==
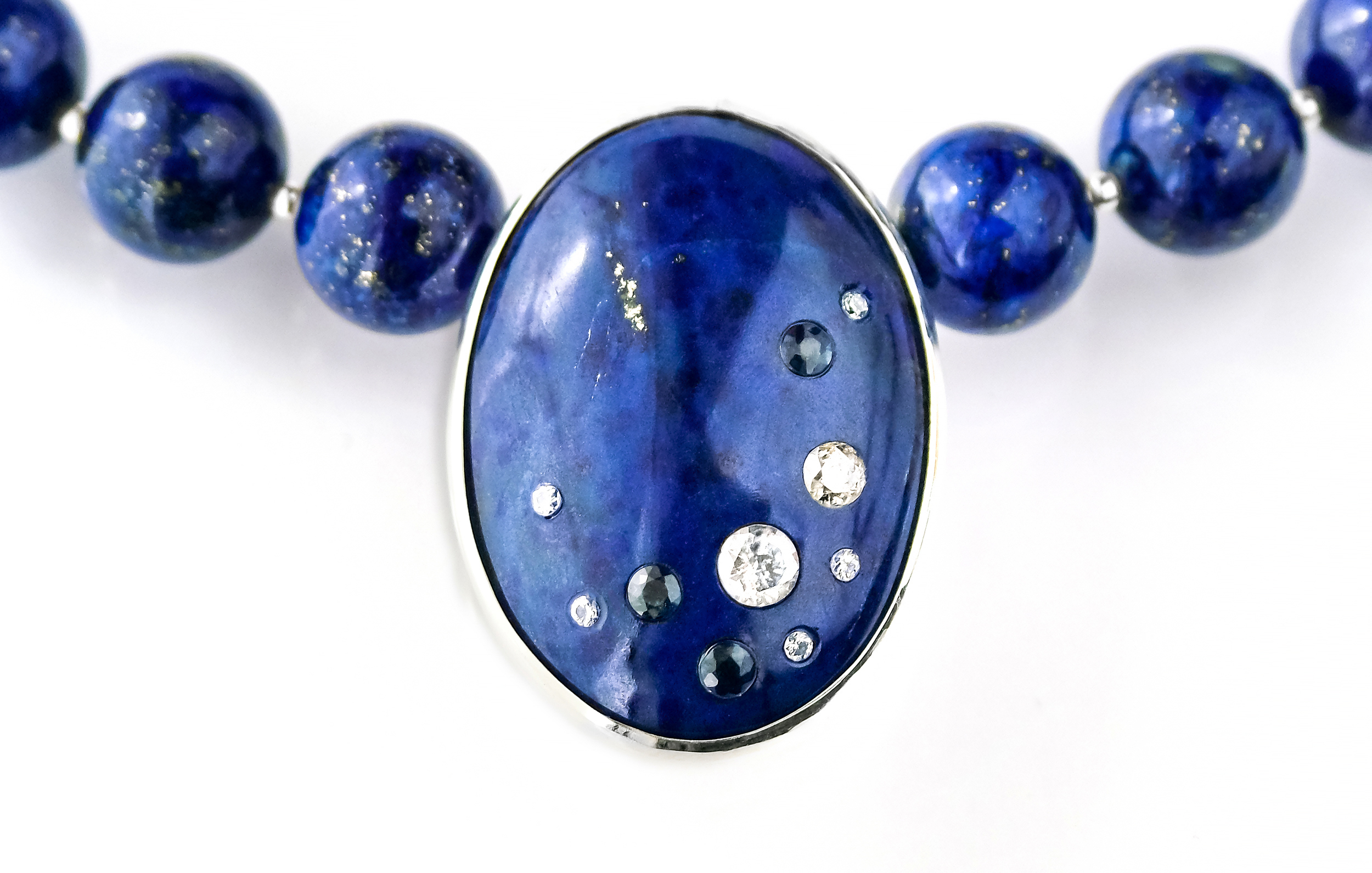
Lapis lazuli necklace with beads and center cabochon set with brilliant cut diamonds and simple cut sapphires through lapidary work.

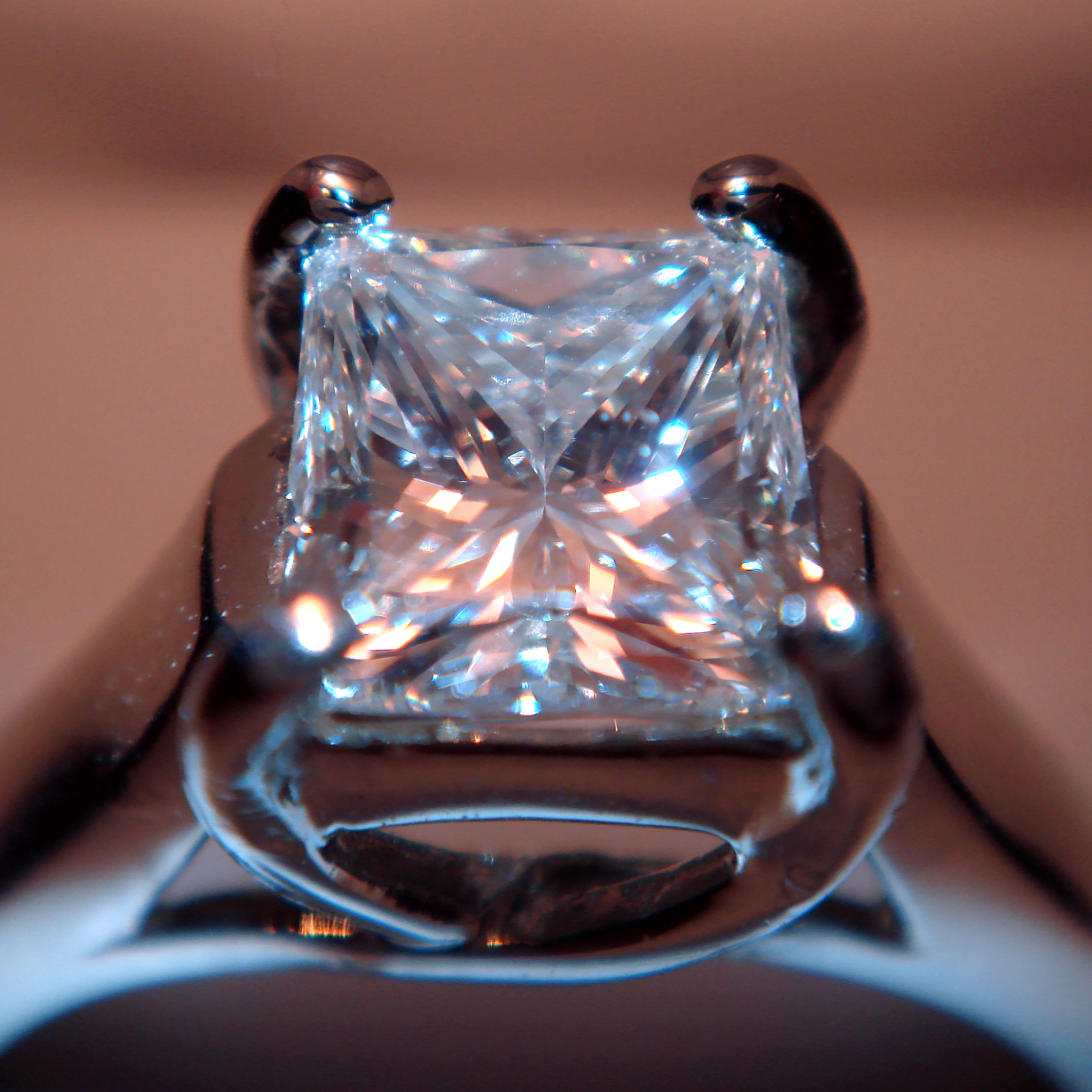
Princess cut diamond set in a ring

- Asscher cut
- Baguette cut
- Brilliant cut
- Briolette
- Cabochon
- Cushion cut or old mine cut
- Emerald cut
- Pendeloque cut
- Princess cut
- Radiant cut
- Rose cut
- Trilliant cut, a.k.a. trillian or triangle cut

== See also ==
- Diamond cut
