= William McHardy (diamond magnate) =

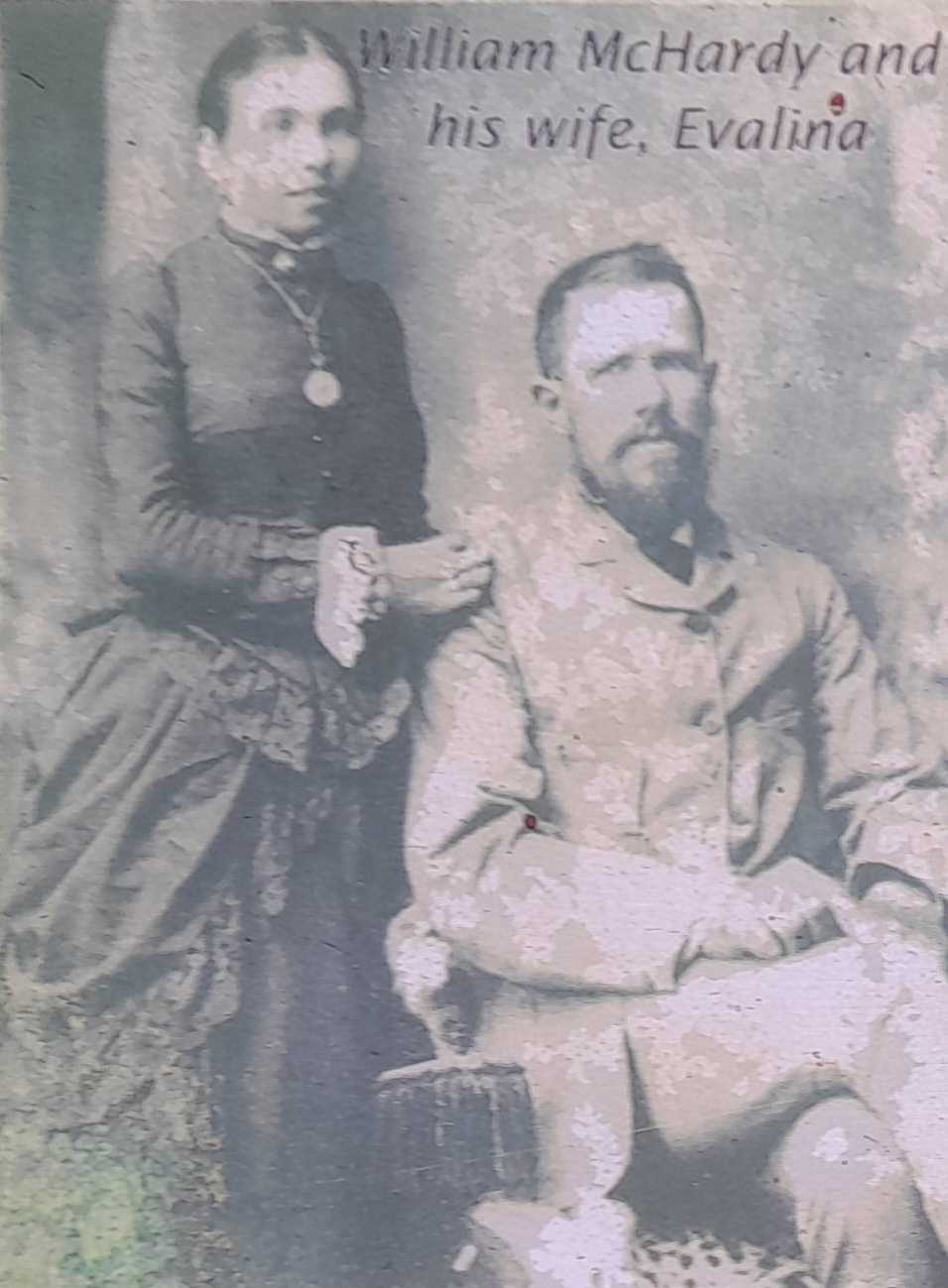
- Evalina and William McHardy
- Born: 30 May 1846; Ballater, Scotland
- Died: 28 August 1913 (aged 67); Cullinan, South Africa
- Occupation: Diamond magnate
- Era: Cullinan Diamond Rush
- Title: General Manager of Premier Mine
- Term: 1903-1913
- Predecessor: Office established
- Successor: Donald McHardy
- Spouse: Evalina Elizabeth McCormick (m. 1880-1913)
- Children: 7

Signature
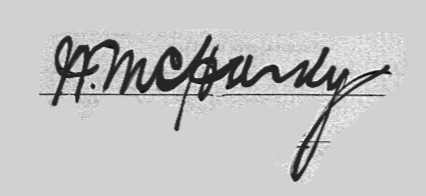

William McHardy (30 May 1846, Ballater, Scotland – 28 August 1913, Cullinan, South Africa) was a Scottish-South African diamond magnate. He was the first General Manager of the Cullinan Premier Mine from 1903 until his death in 1913, after which his son, Donald McHardy, took over his position in the mining industry.

== Career ==
William was first appointed as the General Manager of the Kimberley Mine (in Cape Colony) in the 1880s and 1890s and was later appointed as the first General Manager of the Cullinan Premier Mine in about 1900. He held this post until his death in 1913 when his son, Donald McHardy then took over his position.

== Death ==
William died on 28 August 1913 from heartbreak, not long after his son, James, died. James was accidentally run over by his father's car while his father was driving it. When James died, his room was closed and William ordered that no one was allowed enter James' room.

== Residence ==
McHardy had the McHardy House built in 1903 in Cullinan, not long before the Cullinan Diamond was found. The house is now a museum.

== Gallery ==
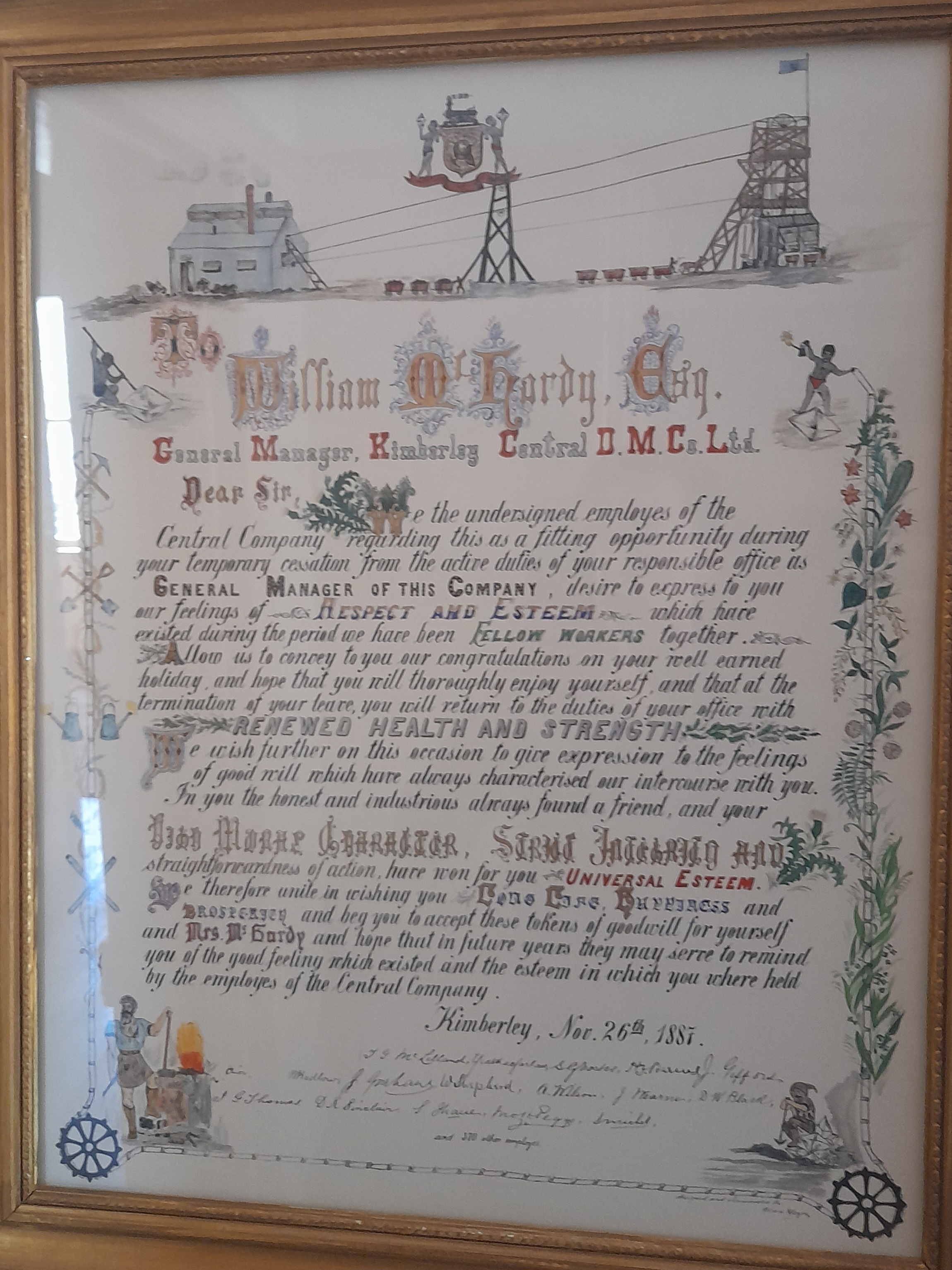
A letter sent to William in 1887.
