= Premier Rose Diamond =

Coordinates: 34.0685°N 118.4044°W

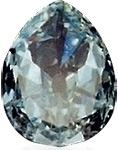
- Weight: 137.02 carats (27.404 g)
- Color: Colourless
- Cut: Pear Shape
- Country of origin: South Africa
- Mine of origin: Premier Mine
- Discovered: 1977
- Cut by: David du Plessis
- Original owner: De Beers
- Owner: Robert Mouawad
- Estimated value: USD 10 million (as of 2006)

The Premier Rose Diamond (353.9 carats (70.78 g)) was one of the large rare gems produced by Premier Mine, of De Beers in South Africa.

== History ==
The Premier Rose Diamond was mined in March 1978. It was purchased by Mouw Diamond Cutting in Johannesburg through a partnership with William Goldberg of New York City. The diamond was marked for bisection by Rose Mouw, the spouse of Jacob Mouw, the founder of Mouw Diamond Cutting.

=== Cutting ===
Frans Swanepoel was responsible for the sawing of the diamond and the cleaving of the lesser half of the diamond was done by Sylvain Mouw and Jacques Mouw. Marcel Cilliers Smulders was the apprentice who assisted with the cutting. The polishing of the two main diamonds of 137.02 (Big Rose) and 31.48 (Little Rose) ct. was done by David du Plessis (who was also responsible for polishing The Golden Jubilee and was one of the main polishers of the Centenary Diamond), and the 2.11 carats (422 mg) Baby Rose was done by Mike Botha and Willem Joubert. The stones resulting from the original stone have been named the Premier Rose family, with the largest retaining the name of Premier Rose Diamond.

The Premier Rose collection ranks among the finest polished gems in the world and became the benchmark in symmetry and proportions for large fancy cut diamonds.

=== Name ===
The diamond was subsequently named after the Premier mine and Rose Mouw, hence the name Premier Rose.

=== Details ===
This diamond had no inclusions, and it was an unmistakably colourless gem. The diamond did not display a definite crystallographic habit and was often incorrectly referred to as a 'cleavage piece'. If a resin model of the diamond is studied however, one would find no evidence of mechanical or natural cleavage on the diamond. The morphology of this diamond was due to plastic deformation during the eruption phase of the kimberlite. The diamond did not exhibit any trigons on the octahedral faces (111) or noticeable striae on the dodecahedral faces (110) and the crystallographic orientation was derived from the presence of two orthogonal inversions on one of the hexahedral faces (100).

== See also ==
- List of diamonds
