= Pretoria District North (House of Assembly of South Africa constituency) =

South African constituency, 1910–1929

- Pretoria-Distrik-Noord
- Former constituency for the South African House of Assembly
- Province: Transvaal
- Electorate: 2,524 (1924)

Former constituency
- Created: 1910
- Abolished: 1929
- Number of members: 1
- Last MHA: Harm Oost (NP)
- Replaced by: Pretoria District

Pretoria District North (Afrikaans: Pretoria-Distrik-Noord) was a constituency in the Transvaal Province of South Africa, which existed from 1910 to 1929. It covered a rural area to the north of Pretoria, the administrative capital of South Africa. Throughout its existence it elected one member to the House of Assembly and one to the Transvaal Provincial Council.

== Franchise notes ==
When the Union of South Africa was formed in 1910, the electoral qualifications in use in each pre-existing colony were kept in place. In the Transvaal Colony, and its predecessor the South African Republic, the vote was restricted to white men, and as such, elections in the Transvaal Province were held on a whites-only franchise from the beginning. The franchise was also restricted by property and education qualifications until the 1933 general election, following the passage of the Women's Enfranchisement Act, 1930 and the Franchise Laws Amendment Act, 1931. From then on, the franchise was given to all white citizens aged 21 or over. Non-whites remained disenfranchised until the end of apartheid and the introduction of universal suffrage in 1994.

== History ==
Pretoria District North, like most of the rural Transvaal, had a largely Afrikaans-speaking electorate, but it was influenced by its proximity to the capital. Its first MP, Thomas Cullinan, was a mine owner and the namesake of the Cullinan Diamond, the largest diamond ever discovered. He represented the provincial Het Volk party, which later merged into the South African Party, and lost the seat in 1915 but regained it in 1920. It was held by the National Party in its last two elections, and its final MP, Harm Oost, was re-elected to represent the unified Pretoria District seat in 1929.

== Members ==
Election	Member	Party
1910	Thomas Cullinan	Het Volk
1915	J. A. Joubert	National
1920	Thomas Cullinan	South African
1921	J. A. Joubert	National
1924	Harm Oost	National
1929	constituency abolished	

== Detailed results ==
=== Elections in the 1910s ===
General election 1910: Pretoria District North
Party	Candidate	Votes	%	±%
Het Volk	Thomas Cullinan	1,138	61.1	New
Labour	J. T. Bain	538	28.9	New
Independent	I. Haarhoff	188	10.1	New
Majority		600	32.2	N/A
Het Volk win (new seat)				

General election 1915: Pretoria District North
Party	Candidate	Votes	%	±%
National	J. A. Joubert	826	50.8	New
South African	Thomas Cullinan	800	49.2	−11.9
Majority		26	1.6	N/A
Turnout		1,626	77.1	N/A
National gain from South African		Swing	N/A	

=== Elections in the 1920s ===
General election 1920: Pretoria District North
Party	Candidate	Votes	%	±%
South African	Thomas Cullinan	987	49.8	+0.6
National	J. A. Joubert	976	49.2	−1.6
Independent	W. T. Nourse	20	1.0	New
Majority		11	0.6	N/A
Turnout		1,983	66.0	−11.1
South African gain from National		Swing	+1.1	

General election 1921: Pretoria District North
Party	Candidate	Votes	%	±%
National	J. A. Joubert	1,165	51.7	+2.5
South African	W. Teichman	1,088	48.3	−1.5
Majority		77	3.4	N/A
Turnout		2,253	69.2	+3.2
National gain from South African		Swing	+2.0	

General election 1924: Pretoria District North
Party	Candidate	Votes	%	±%
National	Harm Oost	1,165	58.8	+7.1
South African	W. R. F. Teichman	794	40.1	−8.2
Rejected ballots		23	1.1	N/A
Majority		371	18.7	+15.3
Turnout		1,982	78.5	+9.3
National hold		Swing	+7.7	
