= Henry Ho (jeweler) =

Jeweler and businessperson

- Born: Yangon, Myanmar
- Education: University of California, Los Angeles; Gemological Institute of America
- Occupation(s): Founder-President of Jewelry Trade Center; Chairman Emeritus at Asian Institute of Gemological Sciences Thailand
- Notable work: World Ruby Forum 2017; Queen's Cut Diamond; King's Cut Diamond

Henry Ho is a jeweler in Thailand and President of the Bangkok Diamond & Precious Stones Exchange.

== Early life ==
Born in Rangoon, Myanmar, the youngest of four children, Ho left for Thailand in 1963. He decided to settle in Bangkok and started a company called "World Lapidary". In 1976 Henry Ho graduated at the Gemological Institute of America (GIA) in Santa Monica, California, USA. During this time, he met Robert Weiser, a fellow student and scholar where together they set up the Asian Institute of Gemological Sciences (AIGS) in 1978.

== Career ==
In 1997, Ho established the Jewelry Trade Center (JTC), Asia's largest gems and jewelry marketplace. Ho led a conglomerate consisting of Thailand's leading captains of industries. Bangkok Bank, TV Channel 3 and Central Group, were invited to take part in a venture to develop a plot of land measuring over 4.5 acres in Bangkok's central business district on the most important business street, Silom Road.

Ho also served in several capacities with the Thai Gems and Jewelry Traders’ Association (TGJTA), beginning from 1993 to the present. He served as the vice-president of TGJTA from 1993 to 1995, and is an Advisor to the association. Ho also represented the highest and official diamond authority in Belgium, the Diamond High Council (1996 - 1999) by operating their Asian office, offering educational courses and promoting Belgian diamond interests.

== Notable activities ==
In 1996, Henry Ho created a special diamond cut for the Queen Mother of Thailand, Queen Sirikit, on the occasion of her 60th birthday. The unique diamond design was named The Queen Sirikit Diamond consisting of 60 facets and a combination of the radiant and brilliant cut diamonds to bring out the maximum brightness and dispersion of light to the viewer.

Several years after the Queen Sirikit Cut was introduced, Ho created another special diamond for the late King Bhumibol Adulydej on the occasion of his 68th birthday. Patents for both of the above-mentioned diamond cuts are held by Ho.

In 1995, the Golden Jubilee, the world's largest faceted diamond of 545.67 carats was purchased from De Beers by a group of Thai business people led by Henry Ho in 1995. It was arranged for the diamond to be given to King Bhumibol as a gift from the people to celebrate the 50th anniversary of the King's ascent to the throne. The yellow-brown diamond was named the Golden Jubilee, blessed by Pope John Paul II and was received by the King's daughter, Princess Maha Chakri Sirindhorn on his behalf in 2000. The diamond is now on display in the Royal Museum at Pimammek Golden Temple Throne Hall in Bangkok as part of the crown jewels.

Ho also served as the Honorary Consul-General of Bhutan to Thailand from 1995 to 2008.

== Recent activities ==
=== The Ruby Heart of Love - World Ruby Forum 2017 ===
The Gem and Jewelry Institute of Thailand (GIT) under the Ministry of Commerce collaborated with the Asian Institute of Gemological Sciences (AIGS) and the Association of Gemmology of France (AFG) to host the first ever World Ruby Forum 2017, an international academic conference aimed to establish ruby as Thailand's most important exported gem.

In conjunction with the World Ruby Forum, Henry Ho's major activities during the event include the World's Most Beautiful Ruby Contest and the Ruby Heart of Love supported by leading entrepreneurs. The Ruby Heart of Love is a charitable project composed of assembling 700 rubies into a heart shape representing love and harmony of the Thai people to commemorate the late King's 70th coronation and also the 84th birthday of Queen Sirikit.

=== Bangkok Diamond & Precious Stones Exchange ===
Most recently, Ho was appointed President of the Bangkok Diamond & Precious Stones Exchange (BDPSE). The BDPSE is officially recognized and endorsed by the World Federation of Diamond Bourses (WFDB). The Bangkok Diamond & Precious Stones Exchange (BDPSE) is currently situated at the Jewelry Trade Center, where Ho oversees the growth and development of the BDPSE along with the executive board, the advisory board and its members.
