= McHardy House =

Museum in Cullinan

- Established: 1903
- Location: 101 Oak Avenue, Cullinan (City of Tshwane Metropolitan Municipality), Gauteng, South Africa
- Coordinates: 25°40′14″S 28°31′02″E
- Owner: 1. McHardy family (1903-1984) 2. Cullinan Premier Mine (1984-Present)

The McHardy House, located on Oak Avenue in Cullinan, South Africa, is a museum which was previously the residence of the first General Manager of the Premier Mine, William McHardy, and his family consisting of his wife, Evalina, their 3 daughters and 4 sons. The house was the first house to be constructed at the Premier Mine in 1903. The main bedroom of the house was added in 1908 and a brick toilet as late as 1940. A Victorian Garden was laid out with compacted gravel pathways and the typical ceramic edgings, as well as a rose garden. Two of Williams daughters, Evalina and May, lived in the house until their death within 10 days of each other in July 1984. The house still has working electricity and a working fridge from the 1910s.

== Tours ==
Tours are (as for 25 June 2023) R20 for adults and R10 for children, the museum only takes cash as payment. Tours are done by Simoné Engelbrecht since 2013 and has gotten great reviews.

== Owner ==
William McHardy, the original and first owner was born in 1846 in Aberdeenshire, Scotland. He married Evalina Elizabeth McCormick from King Williams Town on 21 January 1880 in Griqualand West, Cape Province, South Africa. The couple had 7 children all together. William was the General Manager of the Cullinan Premier Mine until his death on 28 August 1913 from heartbreak from the death of his son, James McHardy. William's son, Donald McHardy, then took over his position in 1913. After William's death, the Premier Mine granted his wife, Evalina, and their daughters residence for life. Evalina died on 3 June 1946 in Cullinan due to lung cancer. She was a heavy smoker. William and Evalina's daughters, Evalina and May, lived in the house until their deaths in 1984.

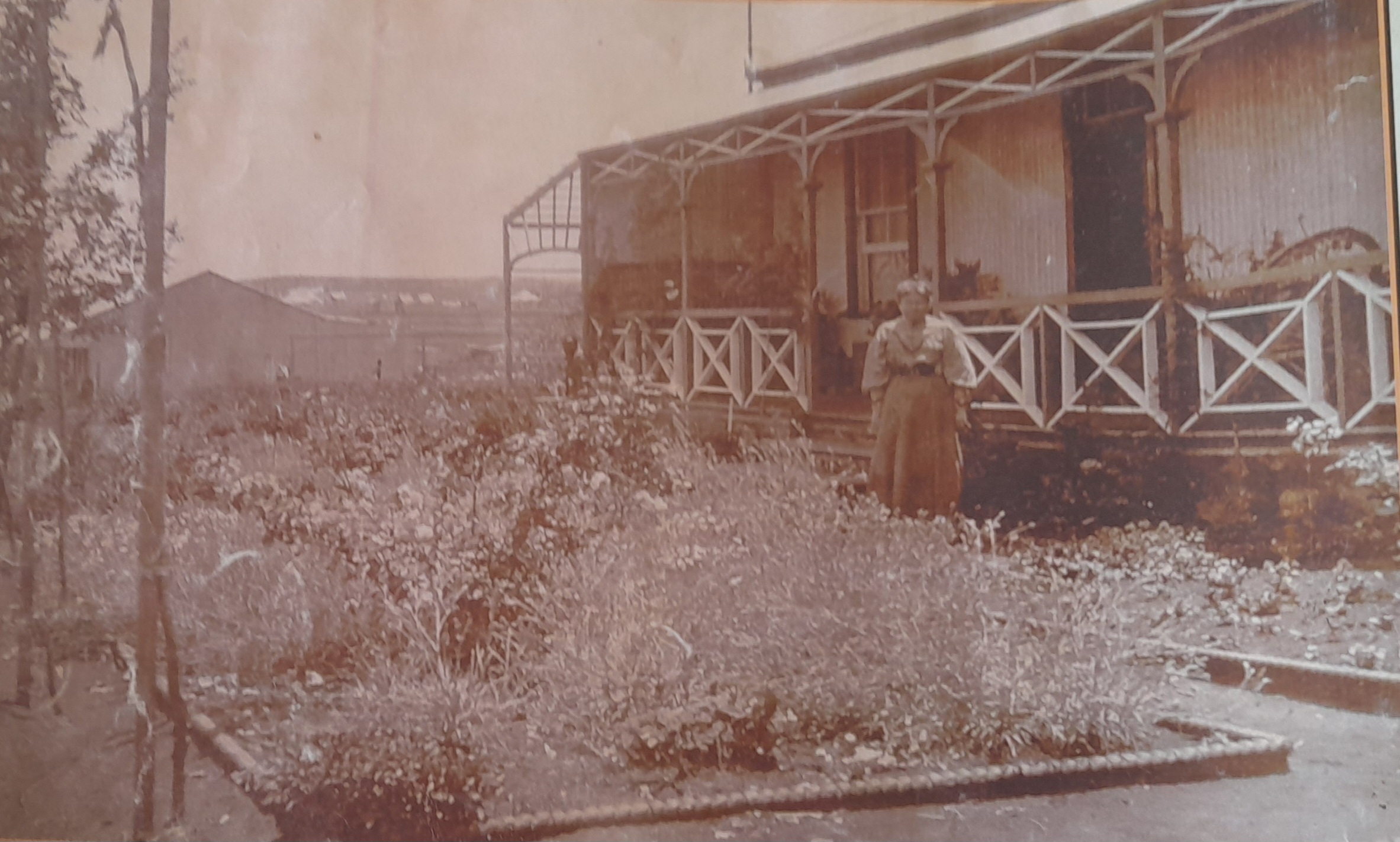
Evalina McHardy (William's wife) in front of the house before the master bedroom was added in 1908.

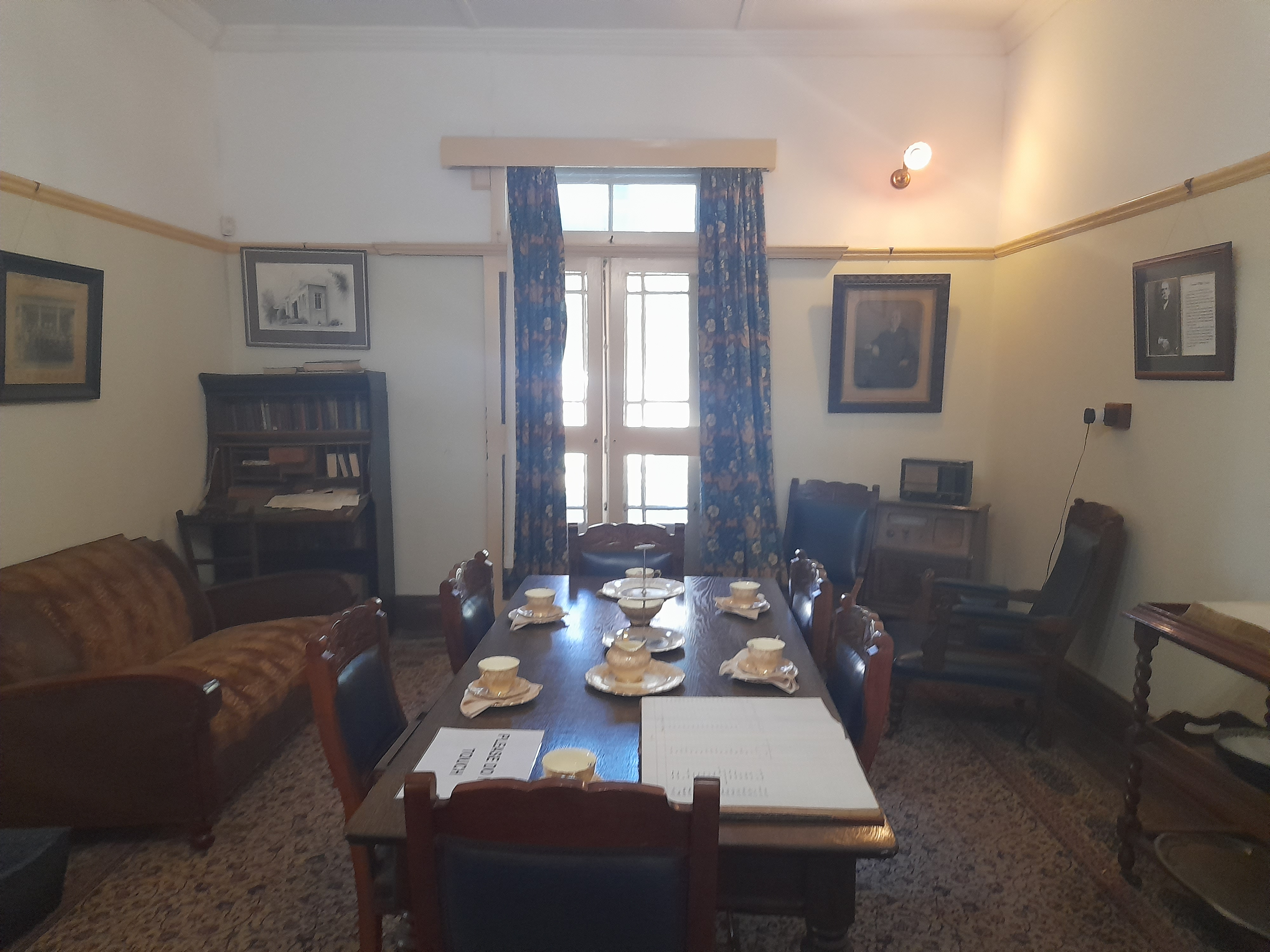
The house's dining room

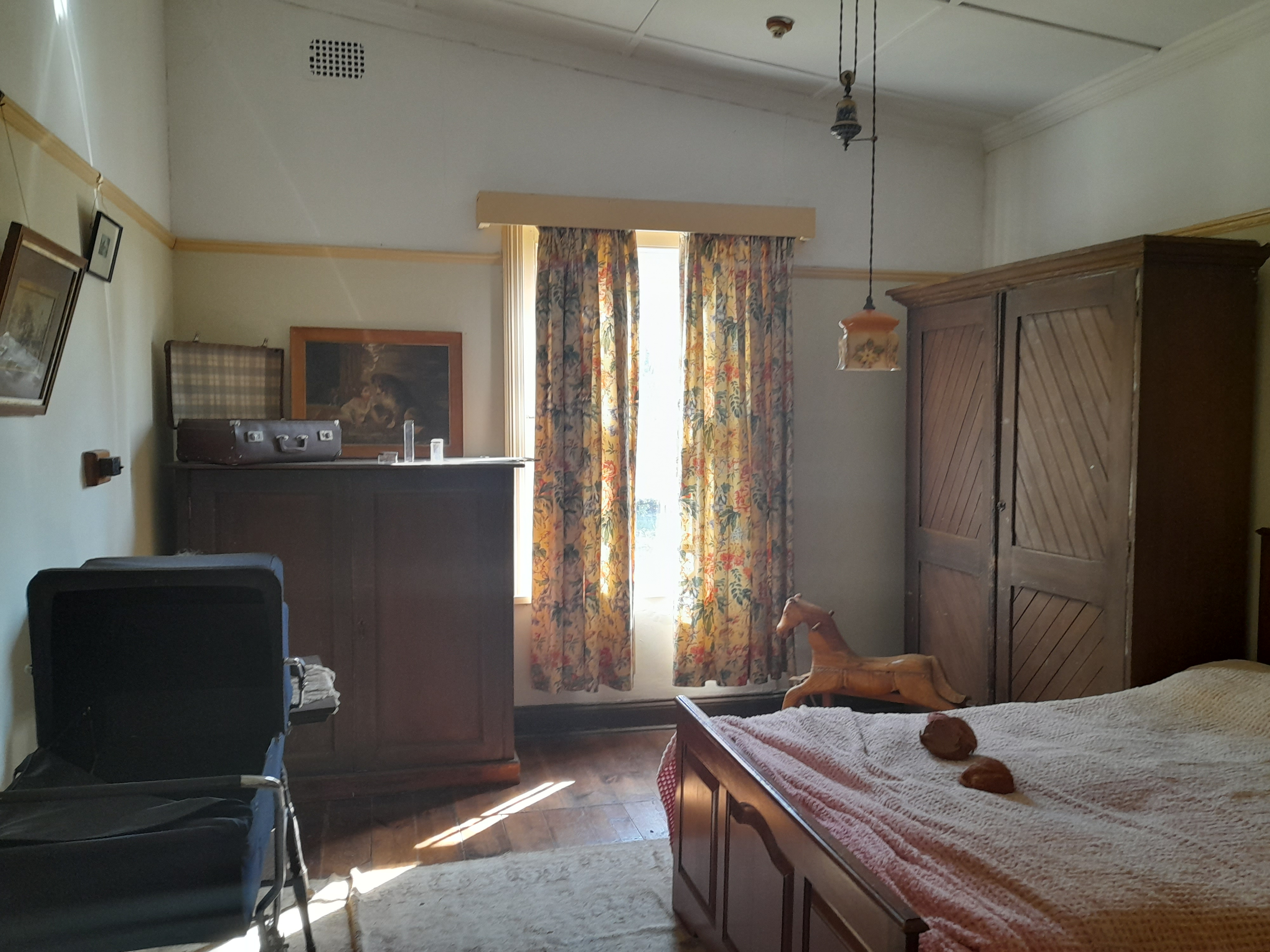
One of William McHardy's daughter's bedrooms

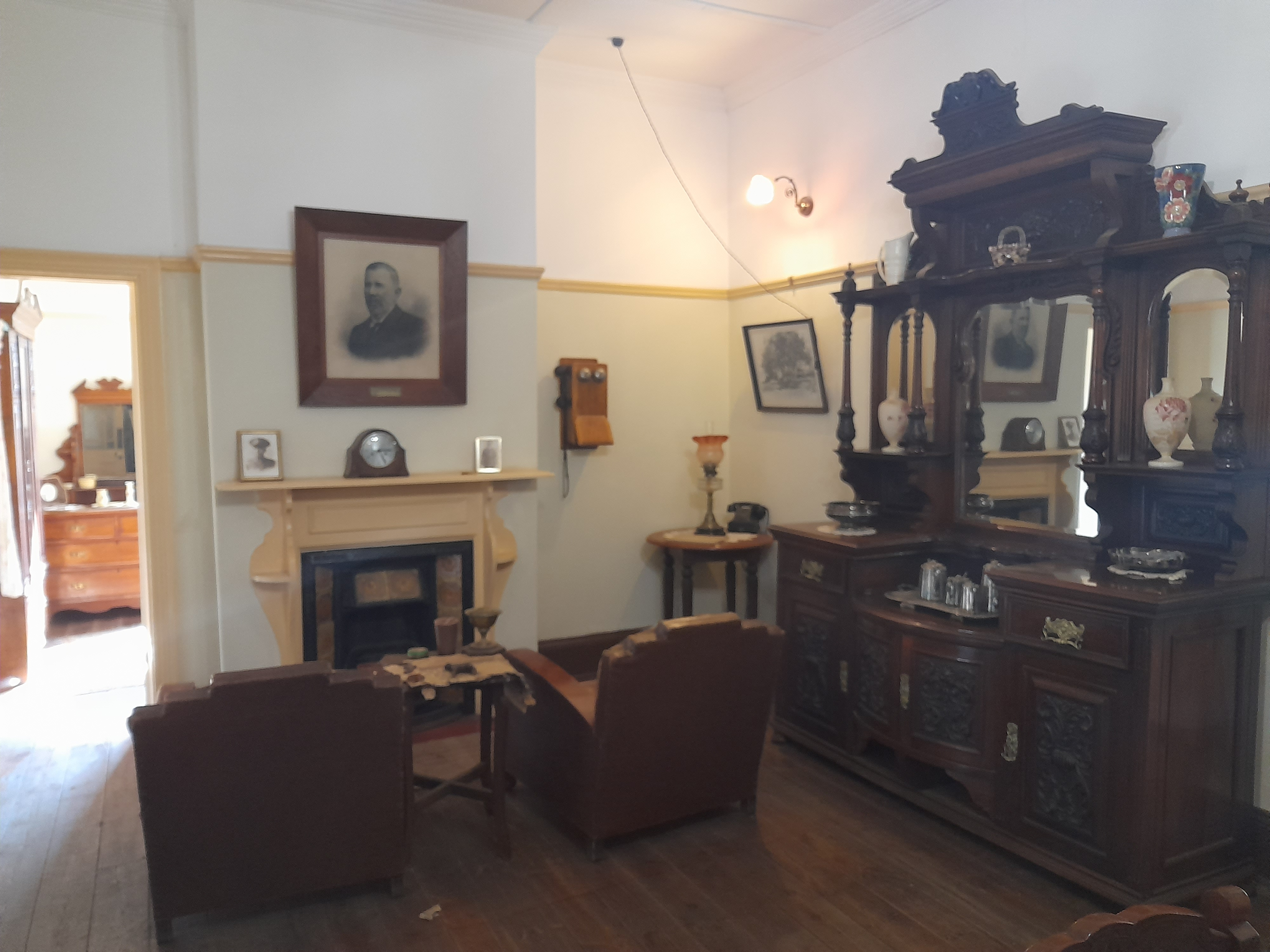
The main living room of the house

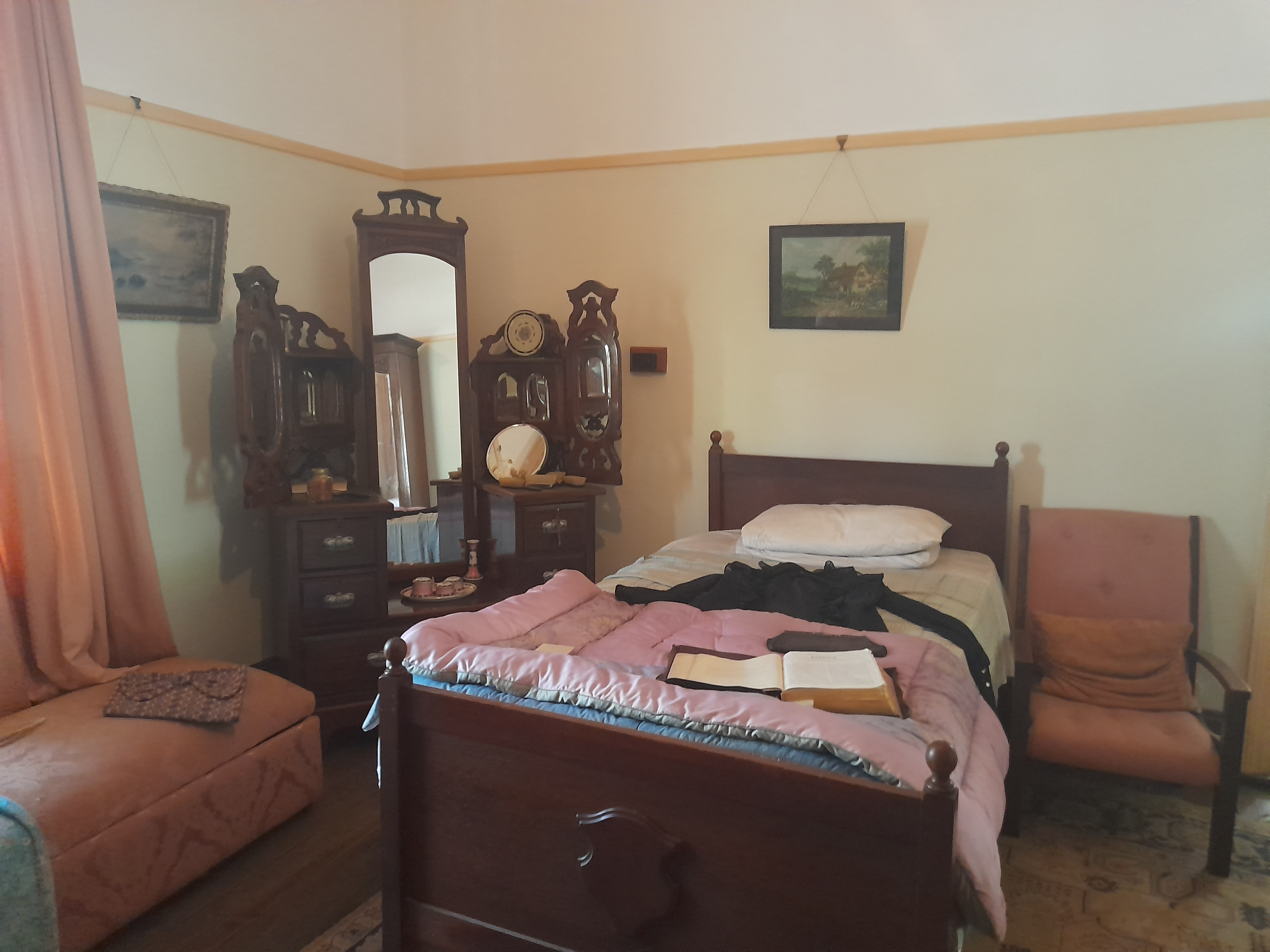
The old main bedroom of the house

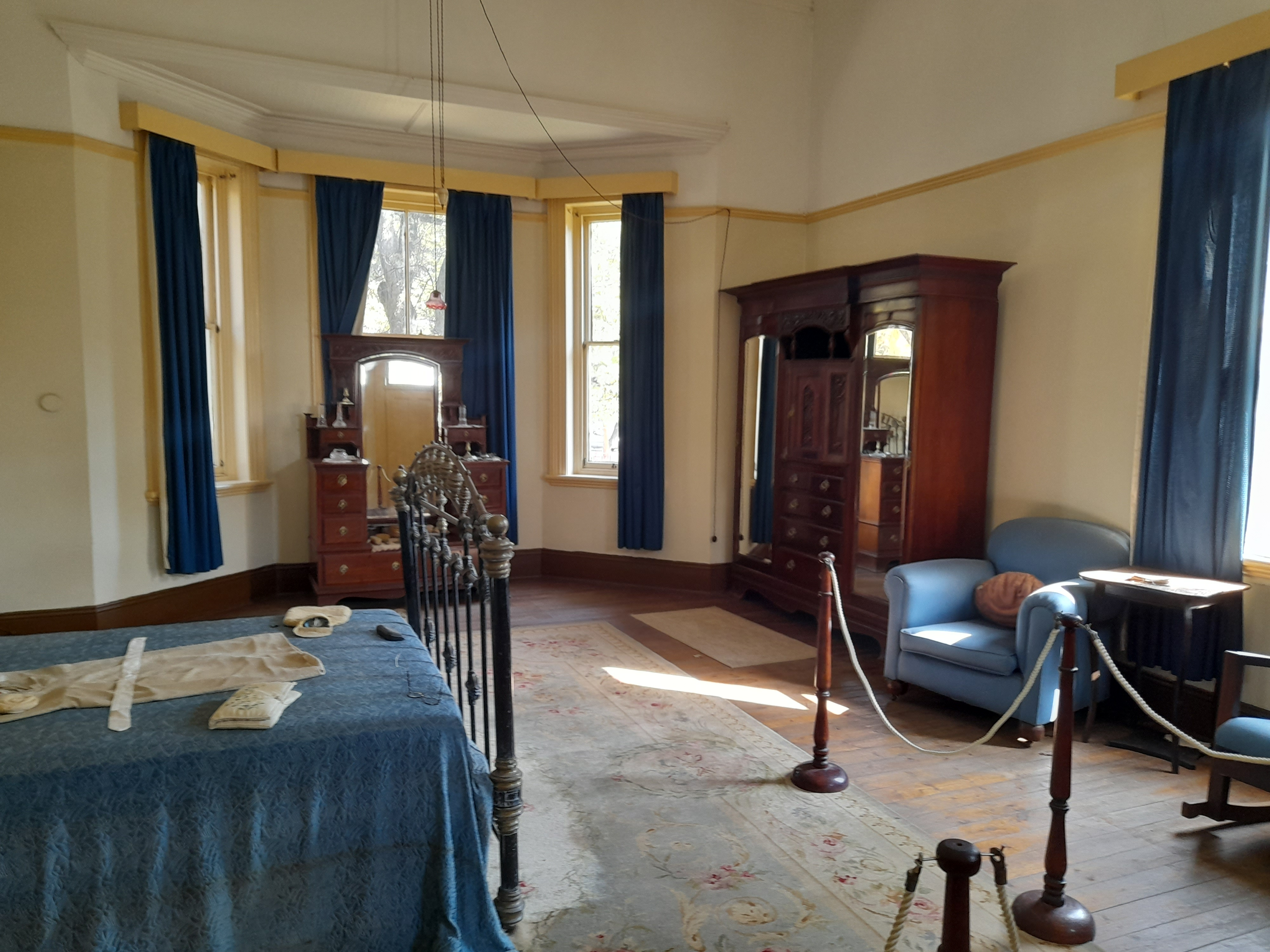
Main Bedroom
