= Millennium Sapphire =

Blue Sapphire Gem

The Millennium Sapphire is a blue sapphire discovered in 1995 in Madagascar, the natural dark–blue gem weighed 89,850 carats (nearly 40 pounds, or 17.97 kilograms).

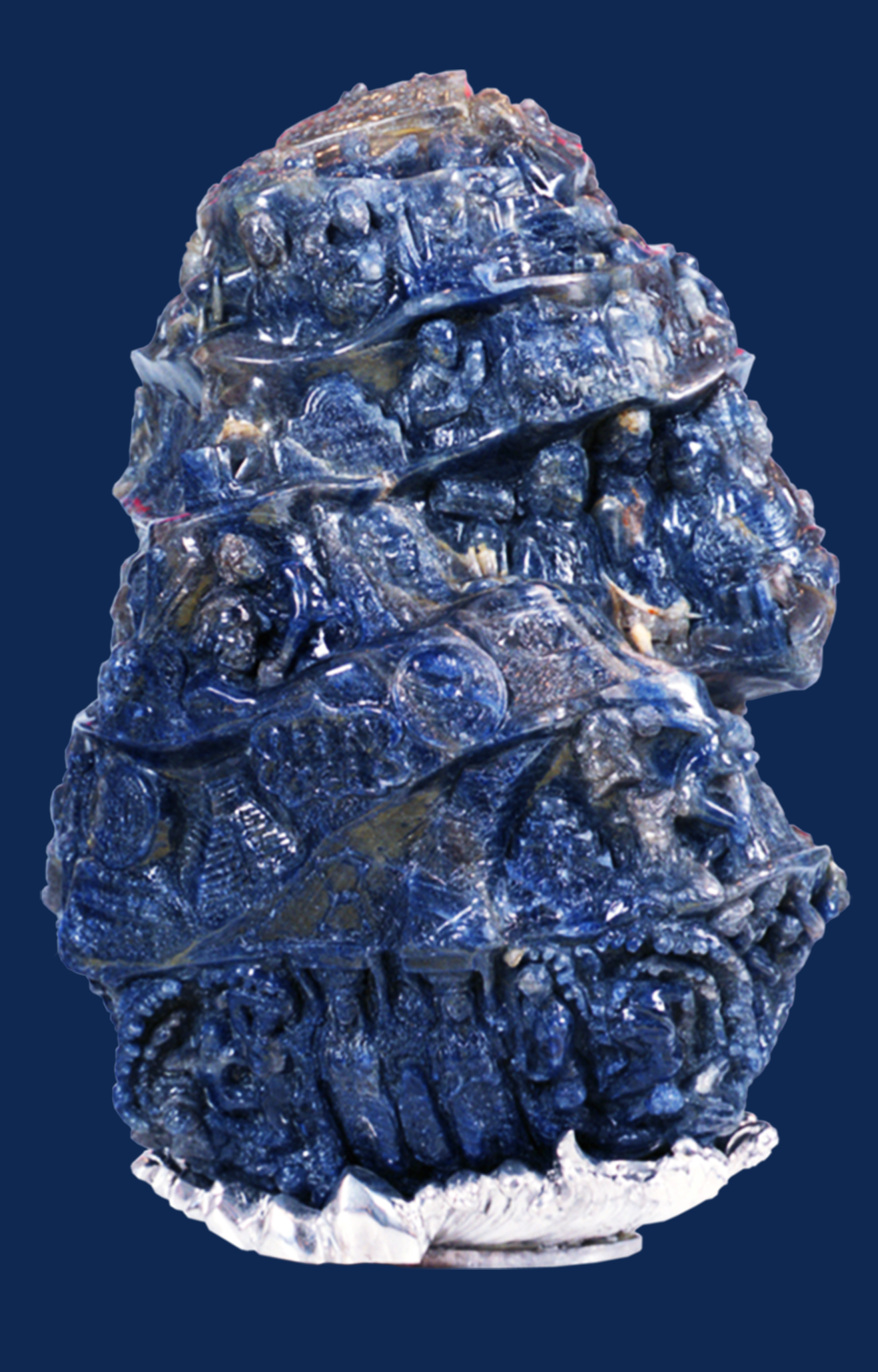
The Millennium Sapphire

== History ==
The Millennium Sapphire was discovered in 1995 by a miner in central Madagascar. Rather than cut it into smaller pieces, Daniel Mckinney, one of the owners of the gem, sought to use the whole stone and kept it as one crystal to pay tribute to humanity.

In 2003 the Guinness World Records was awarded to The Millennium Sapphire as The World’s Largest Engraved Sapphire at 61,500-carats. Today, it is still regarded as the world’s largest gem-quality engraved sapphire.

The Millennium Sapphire was certified in its rough form by the Asian Institute of Gemological Sciences and the Gemological Institute of America. The Gubelin Lab of Switzerland recently certified the sapphire in its finished, carved form at 61,500 carats (almost 28 pounds, or 12.3 kilograms).

The Millennium Sapphire was showcased at the 2002 Academy Awards, and in 2004 it made an appearance in Seattle at the launch of Princess Cruises' ship, The Sapphire Princess.

In 2020, Art Appraiser Pascal Butel, M.S. INALCO appraised the fair market value of the Millennium Sapphire at USD 100,000,000 – USD 150,000,000.

== Design ==
Italian artist and jewelry designer Alessio Boschi researched subjects for the project and selected 134 representations of important individuals and milestones in human history. Several of the stone’s carvings also reflect its origin in Madagascar.

== See also ==
- List of individual gemstones
