= Gabi Tolkowsky =

Belgian diamond cutter (1939–2023)

- Born: Gabriel S. Tolkowsky; 15 September 1939; Tel Aviv, Mandatory Palestine
- Died: 28 May 2023 (aged 83); Tel Aviv, Israel
- Title: Chevalier de L'Ordre du Roi Leopold II

Gabriel S. Tolkowsky (15 September 1939 – 28 May 2023) was a Belgian-Israeli diamond cutter, best known for cutting the Centenary Diamond. He was the great nephew of Marcel Tolkowsky, father of the modern round brilliant diamond cut. He is the sixth generation in his family to become well-known in the diamond cutting trade.

== Family history ==
Gabriel's great-grandfather, Abraham Tolkowsky, was born on June 5, 1838 in Russia. In the 1880s, he moved from Bialystok in Poland, to Antwerp, Belgium and started a successful career as a diamond merchant. He married Lifsche Moed, and inspired a number of their nine children to pursue careers in the diamond trade. Their son Moise or Maurice developed various methods for cutting round diamonds, and Samuel or Sam was appointed as the inaugural chairman of the Antwerp Diamond Exchange.

Following the First World War, the family sought refuge in England and the Far East. Marcel Tolkowsky, the grandson of Israel (Isidore), introduced the Ideal Cut diamond, a benchmark that remains prominent in the industry today.

== Career ==
Gabriel Tolkowsky began training with his father Jean in 1956. He acted as the Managing Director and Chairman of Diatrada, N.V., a division of De Beers for over 20 years and continued as their Worldwide Consultant beginning in 1995.

=== Centenary Diamond ===
In 1988, Tolkowsky was commissioned to act as master cutter for the 273.85 carats (54.770 g) Centenary Diamond. This diamond remained untouched for over a year while the correct tools and technical conditions were created by Gabi and his team. The gem was kerfed (hand cleaved) in order to avoid heat or vibration-related damage from using saws or lasers. In 1991, after working on the project for three years, Tolkowsky's Centenary Diamond was officially completed, weighing 273.85 carats (54.770 g). It presented 247 facets and has been acknowledged as the largest, most color-perfect and flawless modern diamond cut in the world.

=== Golden Jubilee Diamond ===
During this time, Gabi Tolkowsky was again selected by the De Beers group in order to design and cut the Golden Jubilee Diamond. The Golden Jubilee is the largest faceted diamond in the world, weighing 545.67 carats (109.134 g), more than the Cullinan Diamond. The diamond was a 755.50-carat (151.100 g) rough stone. It presents 148 facets, has a yellow-brown color intensified by the brilliant cushion cut. The Golden Jubilee was chosen as a gift to the King of Thailand to celebrate his fifty years on the throne.

=== Gabrielle Diamonds ===
Drawing from techniques learned during the polishing of the Centenary and the Golden Jubilee diamonds, and from his experience with the "Flower Cuts", Gabi created the Gabrielle Diamond, the world's first triple brilliant cut diamond.

The Gabrielle Diamond in the Round shape consists of 105 facets, 48 facets more than the Classic Round Brilliant cut (with additional eight crown facets and forty pavilion facets). The Gabrielle Diamond was shown by a Light Study to exhibit 200% more scintillation than an excellent-cut classic brilliant diamond, and at the same time exhibited significantly greater brilliance and fire. This was achieved by increasing the path of light through the diamond, so that the diamond appears to sparkle from all angles.

=== Recognition ===
Tolkowsky was interviewed in The Play of Light, a 2000 documentary film about the creation of a diamond from a rough stone, and in 2003 he was knighted by the Belgian government with the title of Chevalier de L'Ordre du Roi Leopold II, for his services to the diamond industry.

== Death ==
Tolkowsky died on 28 May 2023, at the age of 83.
