= Golden Jubilee Diamond =

At one time the largest cut diamond in the world

- Weight: 545.67 carats (109.134 g)
- Color: fancy yellow-brown
- Cut: Fire rose cushion cut
- Country of origin: South Africa
- Mine of origin: Premier Mine
- Discovered: 1985
- Cut by: Gabriel Tolkowsky
- Original owner: Henry Ho
- Owner: King of Thailand

The Golden Jubilee Diamond or Phet Kanchanaphisek (Thai: เพชรกาญจนาภิเษก) is a 545.67 carats (109.134 g) brown diamond and was the largest cut and faceted diamond known until the Black Falcon Diamond was revealed with its 612.34 carat eagle novelty cut. It outweighs the Cullinan I ("Great Star of Africa") by 15.37 carats (3.074 g). The Golden Jubilee Diamond was discovered in 1985 at the Premier Mine (now the Cullinan Diamond Mine), which also produced the Cullinan diamond (1905) and other notable stones such as the Taylor–Burton (1966) and the Centenary (1986).

== History ==
First known as the "Unnamed Brown", the Golden Jubilee Diamond was cut from a large brown diamond of 755.5 carats (151 g), found in the prolific blue ground of the Premier Mine in South Africa in 1985.

Until 1990, the diamond remained largely unknown to the outside world, requiring two years' work to bring it to its current state. A large surface and deep cracks from the interior, as well as several inclusions, meant that cutting and polishing the large diamond presented challenges. De Beers considered this as an opportunity to test new cutting technologies. The same technology used in cutting the future Golden Jubilee diamond was later used in the cutting of the Centenary Diamond, a smaller (273.85 carats) flawless and colorless rough diamond.

Gabriel Tolkowsky was hired by De Beers to cut the diamond and also so he could test special tools and cutting methods that were being developed for use on the colourless D-colour Centenary.

The unnamed diamond was brought to Thailand by the Thai Diamond Manufacturers Association to be exhibited in the Thai Board of Investment Exhibition in Laem Chabang and was selected to herald De Beer's centennial celebrations in 1988.

== Presentation for the Royal Golden Jubilee ==
In 1996, De Beers exhibited the diamond at Thailand's BOI Fair. Recognizing its beauty, a group of Thai businessmen purchased the stone for approximately US$6 million. On the occasion of King Bhumibol Adulyadej's Golden Jubilee — the 50th anniversary of his accession to the throne — the businessmen jointly presented the Golden Jubilee Diamond to the King. An initial plan to mount the diamond on the royal sceptre or the royal seal was not carried out.

It was initially planned to mount the Golden Jubilee in the royal sceptre. A subsequent plan was to mount it in a royal seal.

== Blessings ==
The diamond was brought to Pope John Paul II in the Vatican to receive a papal blessing. It was also blessed by the Buddhist Supreme Patriarch of Thailand.

== Exhibitions ==
The Golden Jubilee Diamond has been exhibited at Henry Ho's 59-story Jewelry Trade Center in Bangkok, the Central Department Store in Lat Phrao (Bangkok), and internationally in Basel (Switzerland), Borsheims in Omaha, Nebraska, USA (owned by Warren Buffett's Berkshire Hathaway Inc.), and Gleims Jewelers in Palo Alto, California. USA. It is now located in the Grand Palace as part of the Royal regalia.

== Value ==
The value of the Golden Jubilee diamond is believed to range between 4 and 12 million USD. If sold at auction, it is likely that this stone would fetch a significantly higher price, such additional value gained from affiliation with prominent individuals (Thailand royalty).

== See also ==
- List of diamonds
