= Cullinan, South Africa =

Cullinan
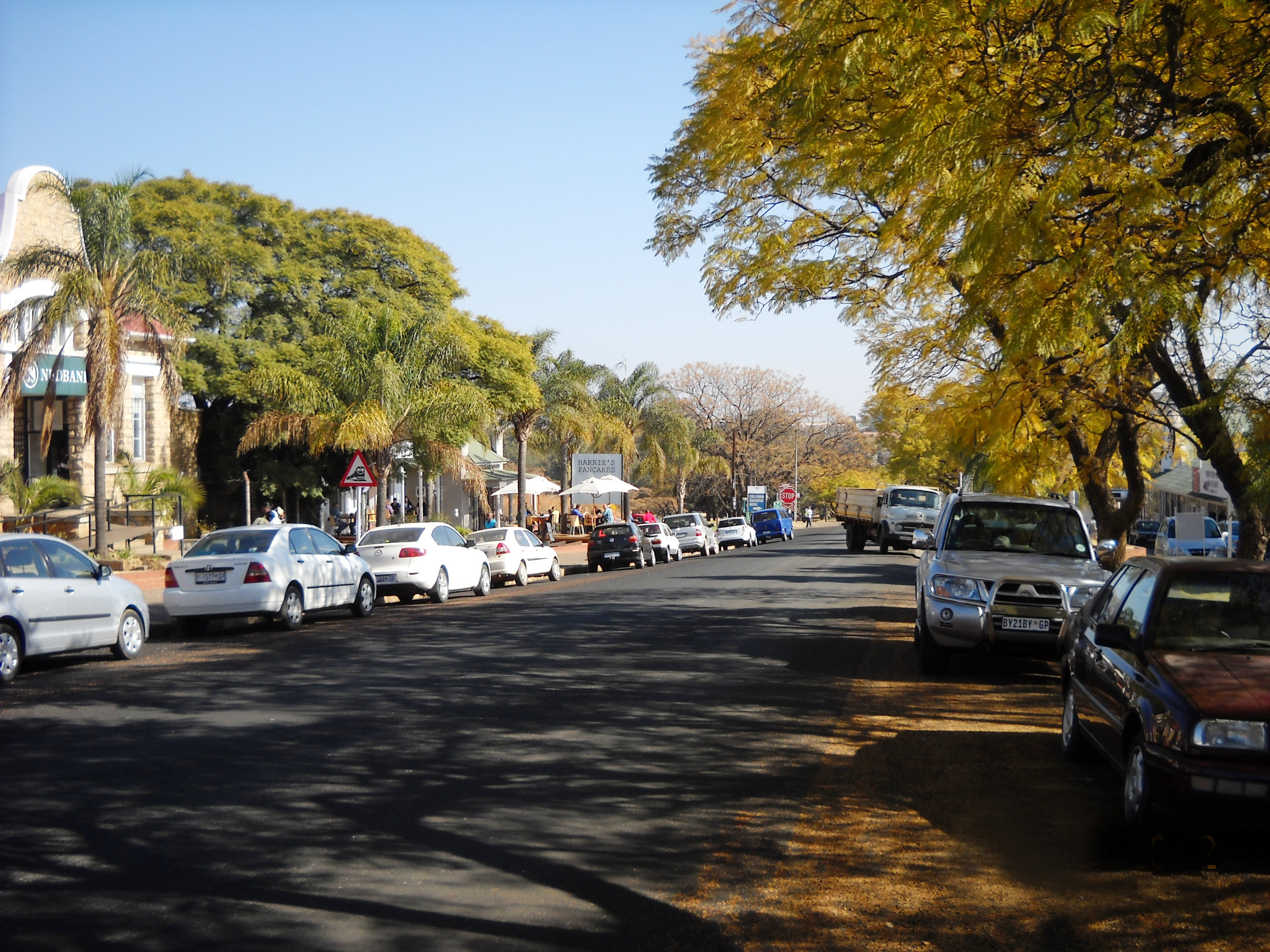
- The main street in Cullinan

- Location within Gauteng Location within South Africa Location within Africa
- Coordinates: 25°40′22″S 28°31′15″E
- Country: South Africa
- Province: Gauteng
- Municipality: City of Tshwane
- Established: 1903
- Named for: Thomas Cullinan

Government
  - Councillor: J.B. Bekker (DA)

Area
  - Total: 55.66 km^{2} (21.49 sq mi)
- Elevation: 1,450 m (4,760 ft)

Population (2011)
  - Total: 8,693
  - Density: 156.2/km^{2} (404.5/sq mi)

Racial makeup (2011)
  - Black African: 64.3%
  - Coloured: 2.7%
  - Indian/Asian: 0.5%
  - White: 31.7%
  - Other: 0.8%

First languages (2011)
  - Afrikaans: 48.9%
  - Northern Sotho: 15.6%
  - English: 9.2%
  - Sotho: 5.9%
  - Other: 20.3%
- Time zone: UTC+2 (SAST)
- Postal code (street): 1000
- PO box: 1000
- Area code: 012
- Website: http://www.cullinan.za.net/

Cullinan is a small town in the Gauteng province of South Africa. It is located 30 km (19 mi) east of the city of Pretoria along the diamond route and is heavily reliant on tourism and the mine that dominates the skyline. The town is named after diamond magnate Sir Thomas Cullinan.

== History ==
In 1898 Sir Thomas Cullinan was handed a three carat diamond found along a farm fence. He studied the area and came to the conclusion that the diamond was washed down from a nearby hill. Sir Cullinan made an attempt to buy the land from the owner, Joachim Prinsloo, but did not succeed. After Prinsloo's death, he was able to purchase the land for £52,000 from Prinsloo's daughter. The Cullinan kimberlite was discovered in 1902 and in 1903 open pit mining commenced. The mine was named the Premier Mine.

On 25 June 1905, the famed Cullinan Diamond, the largest in the world at 3,106 carats (621.2 g), was discovered by Frederick George Stanley Wells, surface manager of the Premier Diamond Mining Company. It was bought by the Transvaal government and presented to King Edward VII.

The town of Cullinan owes its existence to the diamond mining in this area, much like Kimberley in the Northern Cape Province of South Africa.

== Geography ==
Cullinan is situated in the Highveld region of South Africa. The town has an elevation of 1476 m (4842.52 ft) and is located at −25.6709 [latitude in decimal degrees], 28.5236 [longitude in decimal degrees]. The closest city is Pretoria being 40 km (25 mi) away, while Johannesburg is 100 km (62 mi) away.

== Government ==
Cullinan formed part of the Nokeng tsa Taemane Local Municipality until 18 May 2011. Due to mismanagement of funds, this municipality was disbanded and incorporated into the Tshwane Metropolitan Municipality.

== Tourism ==
=== Tours ===
Various operators offer tours around Cullinan. Tourists can choose between tours around town, within the mining area and even underground mining tours. Various means of transportation is used to provide these tours, the most popular being on an open vehicle or on foot.

=== Museums ===
There are a few museums in the area in and around Cullinan. A few of the most popular ones are:

- The History room Cullinan.
- The McHardy House museum.
- The Zonderwater Italian POW museum
- The Sammy Marks Museum

=== Adventure ===
The mountainous terrain surrounding Cullinan offers multiple activities for more adventure-oriented people, like:

- Gorge gliding
- Horse riding
- Abseiling
- Bongo drum sessions
- Archery

There is also an annual mountain bike race called the Cullinan Diamond Rush.

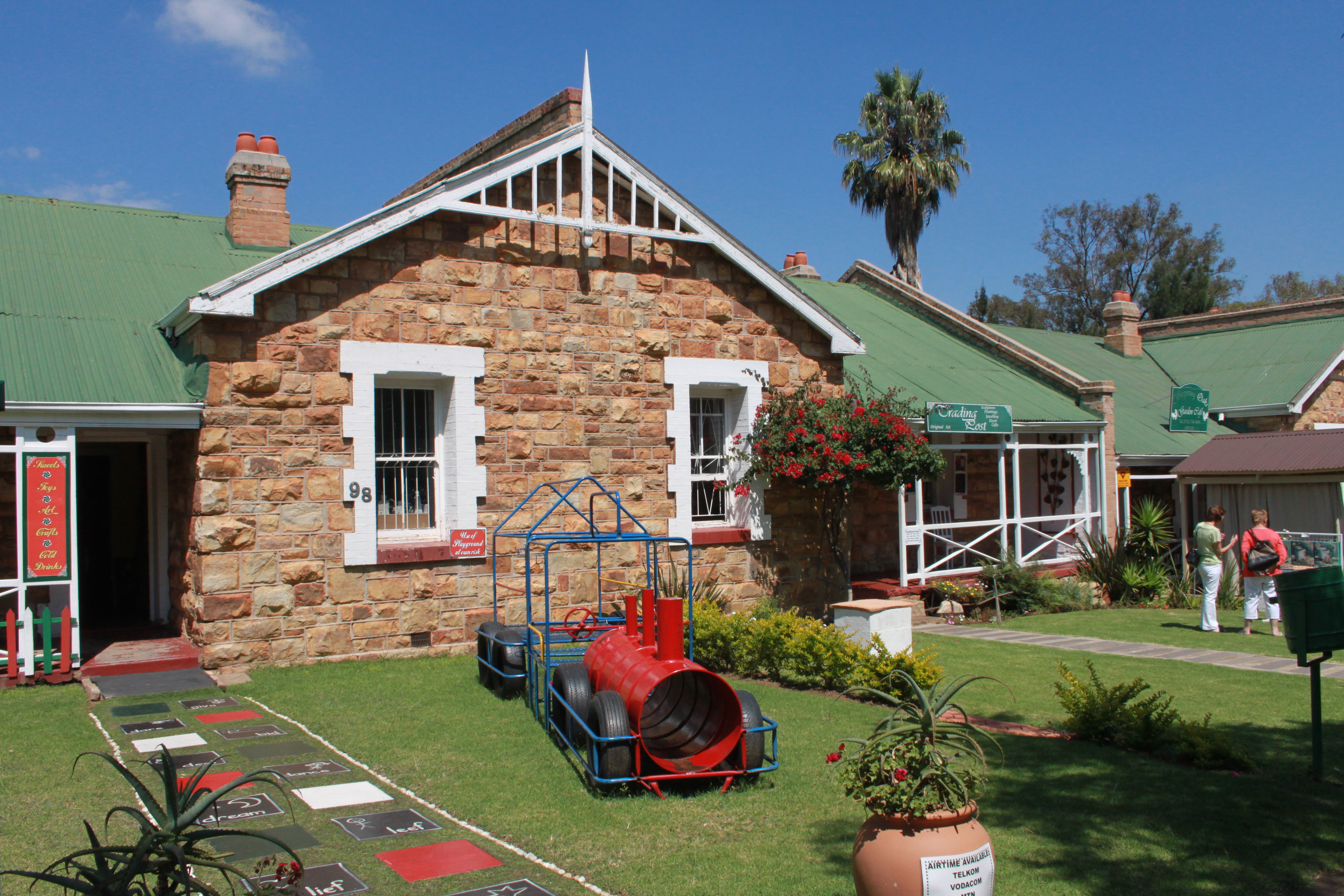
A sandstone house now being used as a restaurant.

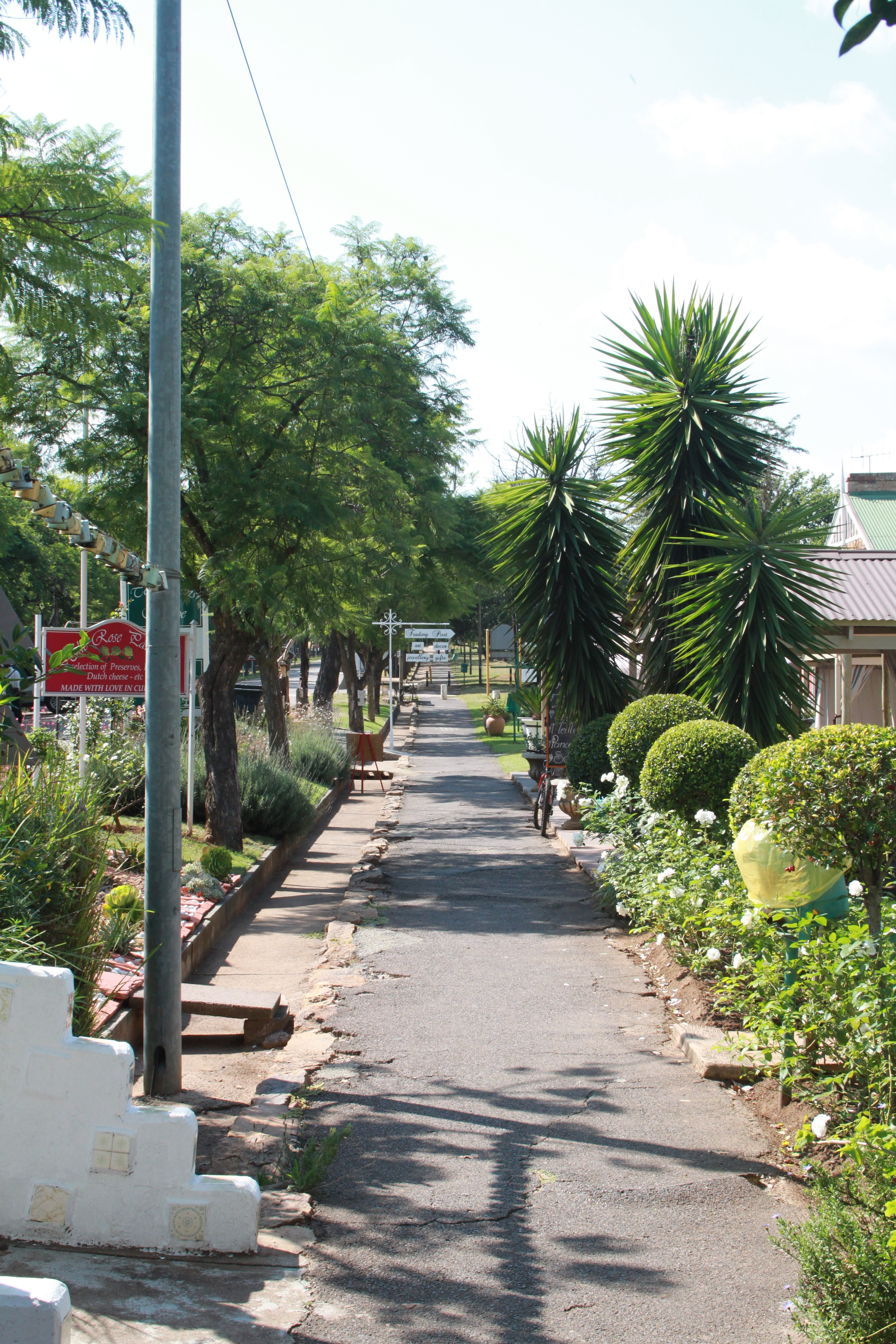
The street containing sandstone cottages, now used as shops and restaurants.

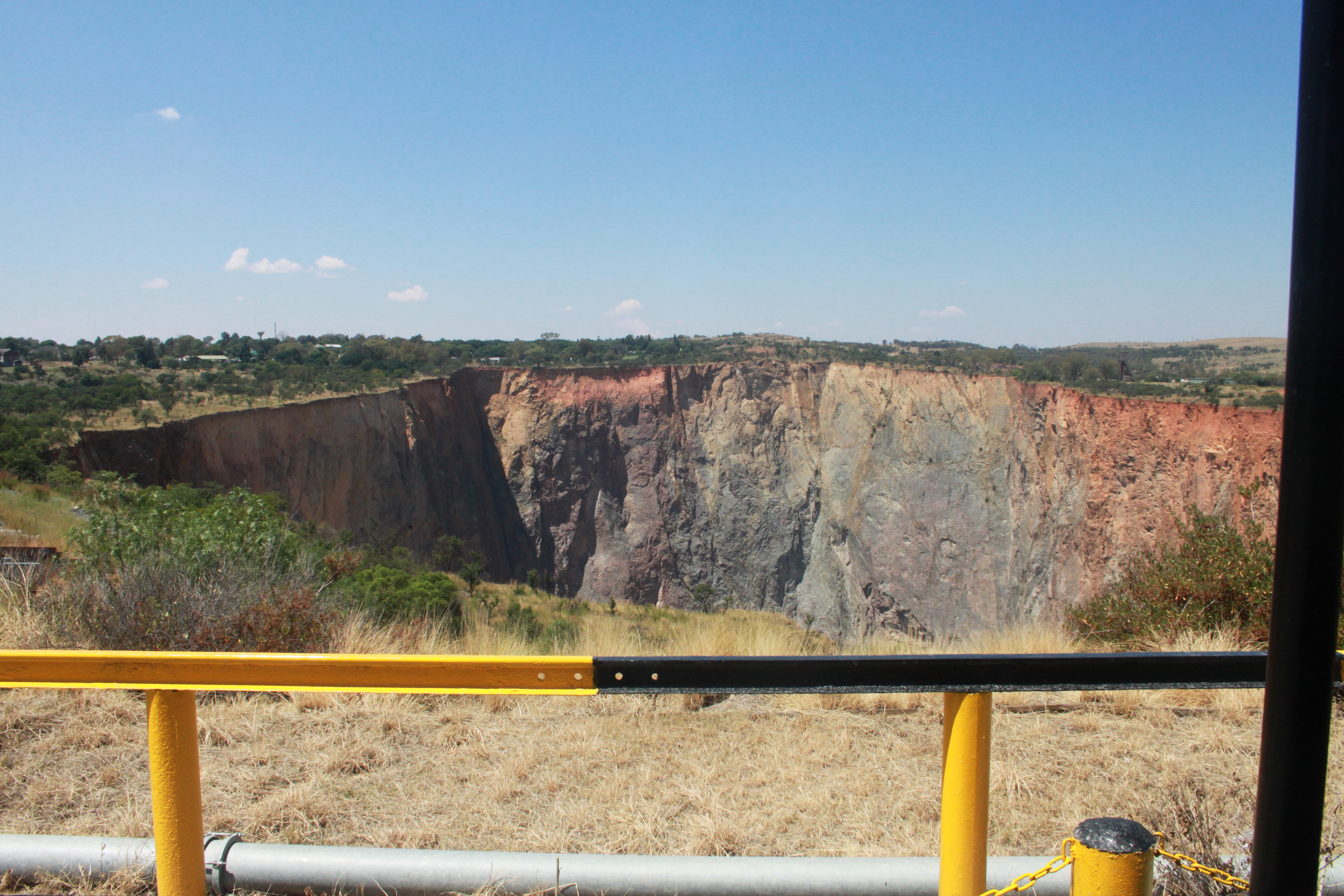
The pit from the open pit mining.

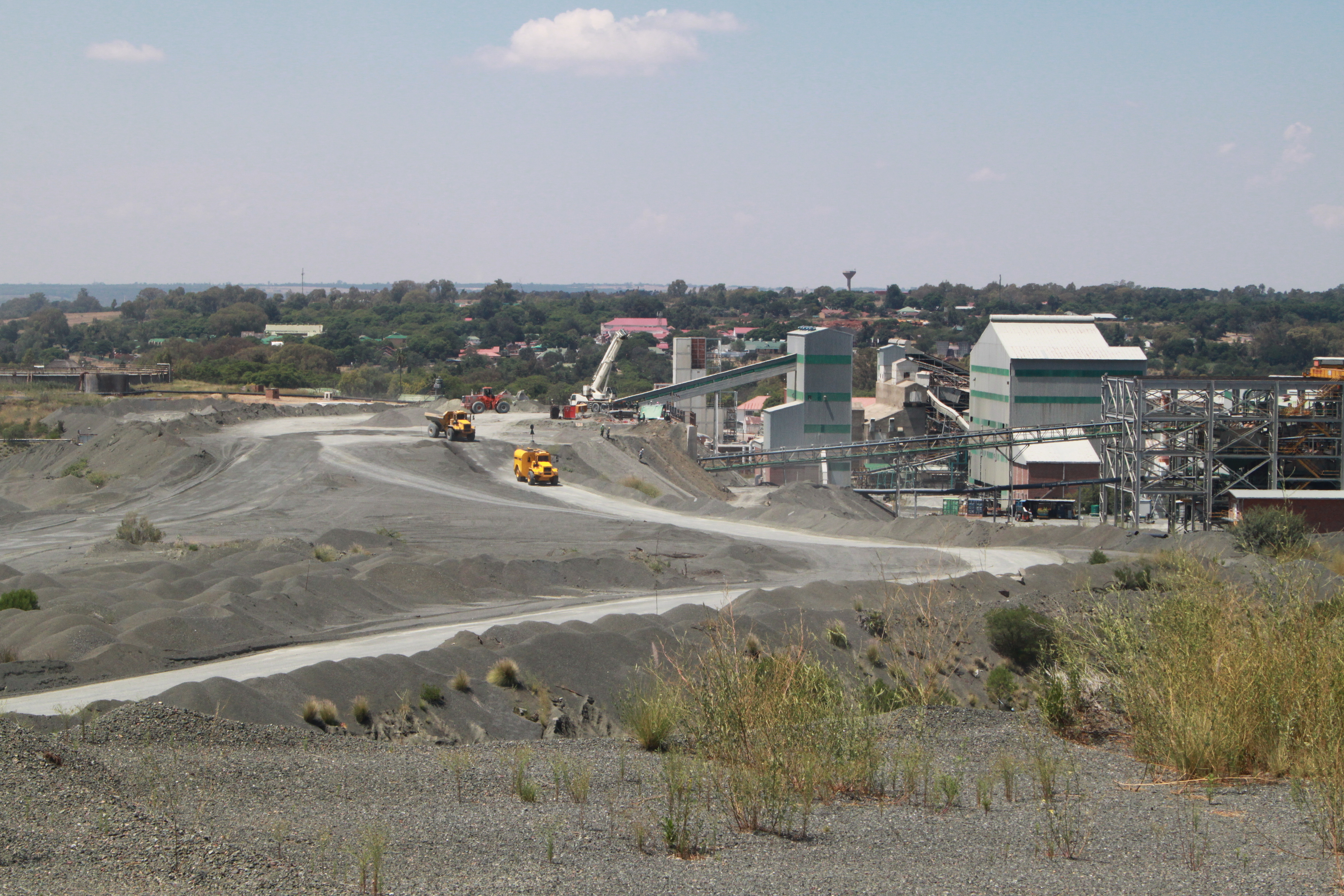
The mine forms the main source of income. Cullinan is in the background.

Tourism activities

== Architecture ==
=== St. Georges Anglican church ===
The church was designed by British architect Herbert Baker, who was a dominant figure in South African architecture between 1892 and 1912. The church was built in 1904 as the parish church for the miners. The church is a simple square structure with a corrugated iron roof. The first recorded meeting was held on April 22, 1906.

=== Cullinan hospital ===
The hospital was built in 1907, and was officially opened by Annie Cullinan, wife of Sir Thomas Cullinan. It served only the European miners back then, but now serves the need of all the people living in Cullinan. The hospital has since closed down.

=== Nedbank ===
The Nedbank building was built around 1908. The building is still in use today by the bank.

=== Masonic lodge ===
The Premier Diamond Masonic Lodge was consecrated in the Cullinan School Hall and met there until 1909 when the new lodge building was completed at a cost of £1200. A feature of the Lodge's history has been the number of times it has been forced into recess, whether because of war, as in 1914 to 1916, disturbances leading to martial law, 1921 to 1922, and the closing down of the diamond mine (the main source of members) during the depression, 1932 to 1941. However the Second World War saw military forces stationed on the mine and an adjoining farm and this helped the lodge to get restarted. Then in 1945 the mine was reopened, restoring 'normality' to Cullinan, and since then the lodge's progress has been steady and sound. The lodge is still in use and looks the same as it did 100 years ago, having been preserved by active members.

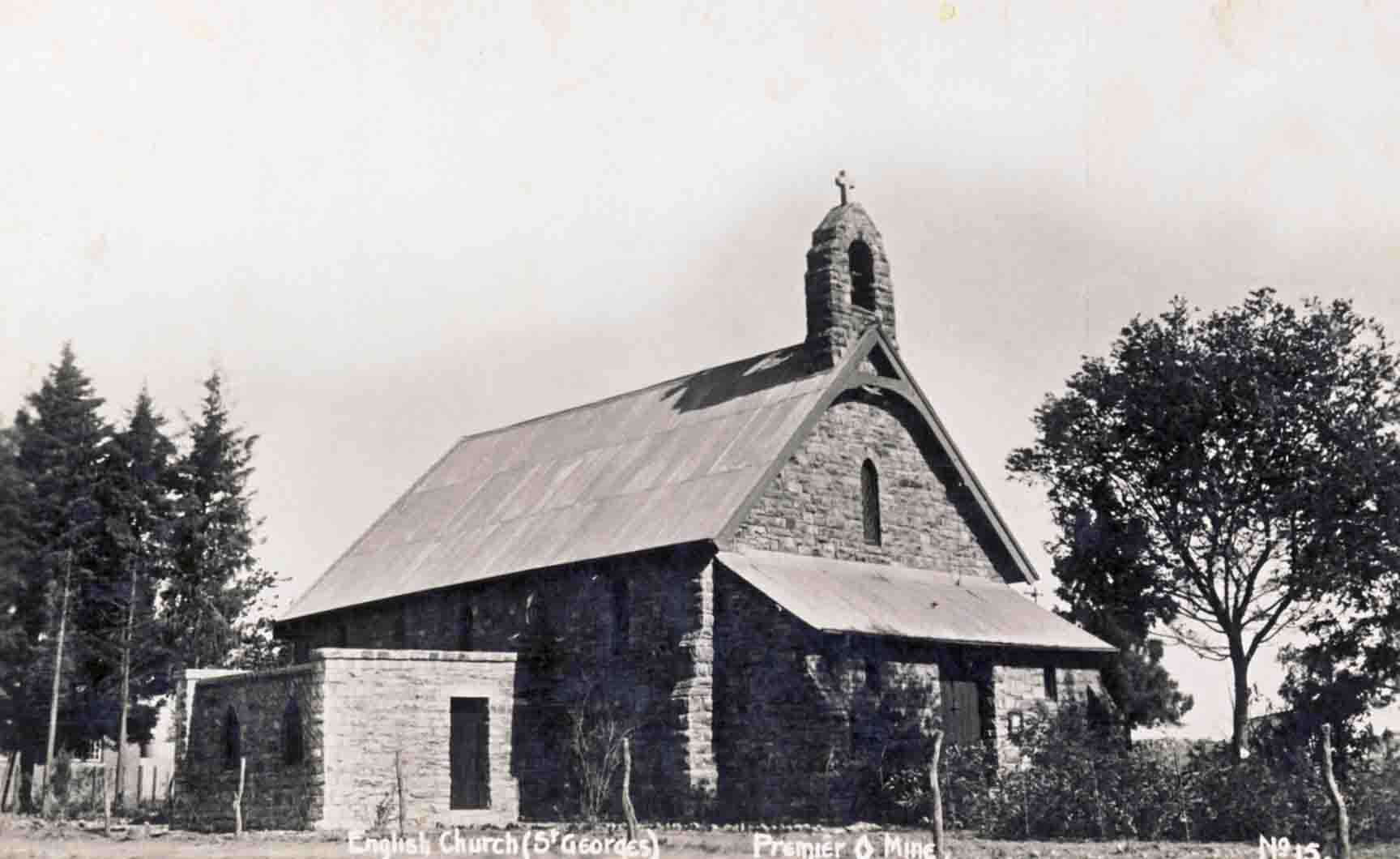
The Anglican church designed by Herbert Baker.

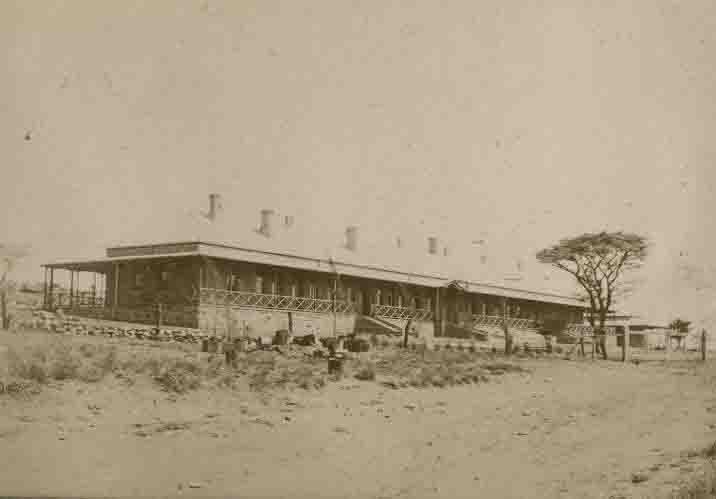
The hospital in 1908, still being used today.

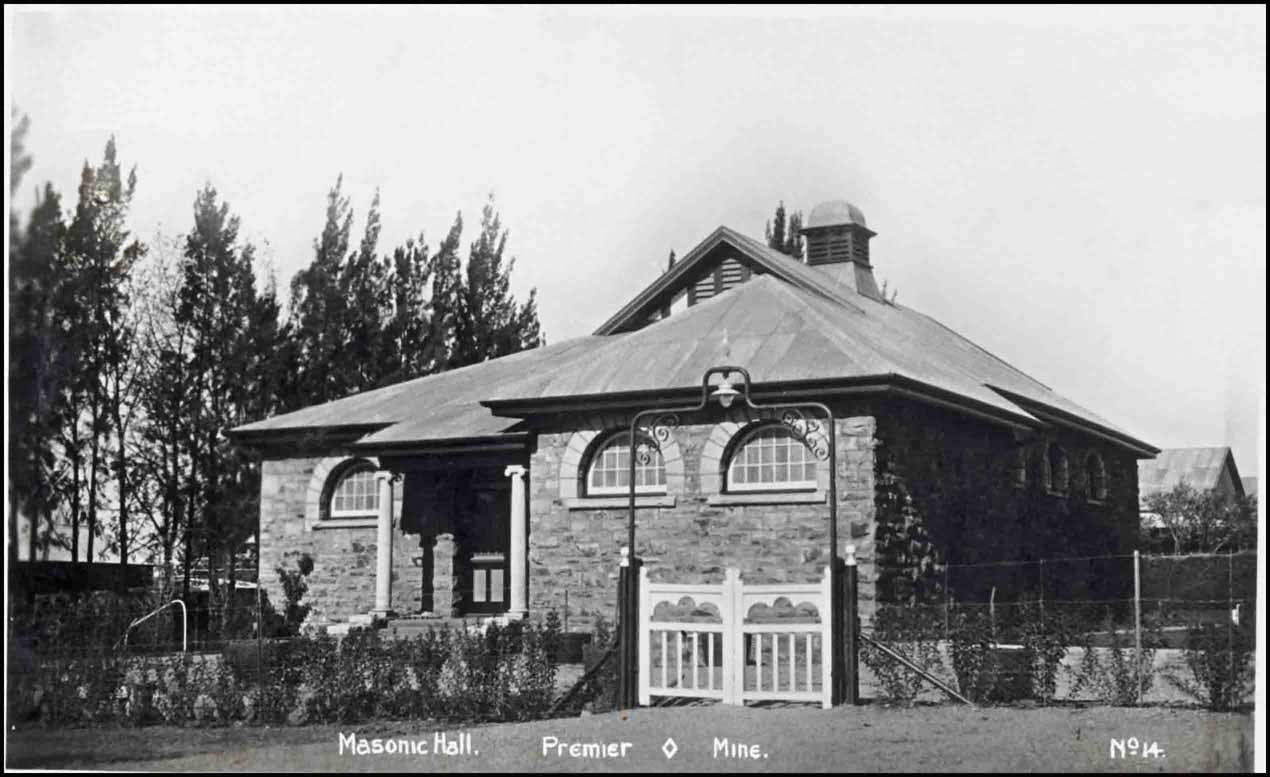
Picture of the Lodge around 1920.

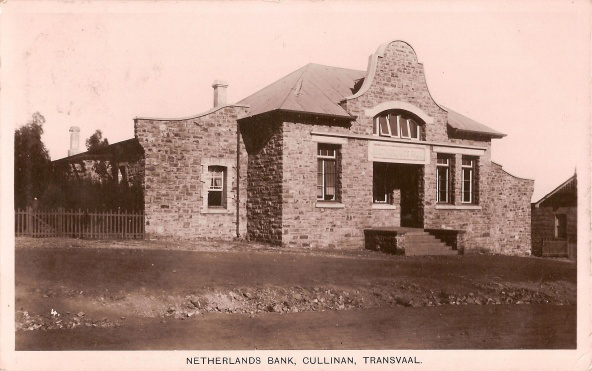
The Nedbank building is still being used today, here pictured around 1908.

Architecture

== Climate ==
The climate is a humid subtropical climate (Koppen: Cwa), with mild temperatures year round and dry winters and wet summers.

Climate data for Cullinan, South Africa
Month	Jan	Feb	Mar	Apr	May	Jun	Jul	Aug	Sep	Oct	Nov	Dec	Year
Mean daily maximum °C	30	30	28	26	24	21	21	24	28	29	29	29	27
Mean daily minimum °C	18	18	16	13	8	5	5	8	12	15	16	17	13
Average rainfall mm	104	113	83	44	18	3	1	2	21	71	108	108	560
Mean daily maximum °F	86	86	82	79	75	70	70	75	82	84	84	84	81
Mean daily minimum °F	64	64	61	55	46	41	41	46	54	59	61	63	55
Average rainfall inches	4.1	4.4	3.3	1.7	0.7	0.1	0.0	0.1	0.8	2.8	4.3	4.3	22.0

== See also ==
- Rayton
- Petra Diamonds
