= Thomas Cullinan (diamond magnate) =

South African businessman (1862–1936)

Sir Thomas Major Cullinan
- Born: 12 February 1862; Elands Post near Seymore, Cape Colony
- Died: 23 August 1936 (aged 74); South Africa
- Occupations: Diamond mine owner, miner
- Known for: Namesake of the Cullinan Diamond
- Children: 10
- Relatives: Patrick Cullinan (grandson)

Sir Thomas Major Cullinan (12 February 1862 – 23 August 1936) was a South African diamond magnate. He is known as the namesake of the Cullinan Diamond, the largest diamond ever discovered, and as owner of the Premier Mine, now renamed the Cullinan Mine, from which the famous gem was extracted on 26 January 1905. He also gave his name to the nearby South African town of Cullinan. He was honoured by the African Methodist Episcopal Church in Tembisa which named their church after him (Sir Thomas Cullinan AME Church).

== Life and career ==
Of Irish descent, Thomas Cullinan was the son of Thomas Bates Cullinan (1837–1879) and his wife Eliza Harriet Carr Pitchers (1839–1880), a daughter of Major Thomas Clarke Pitchers, both born in England. His Irish grandfather, James Cullinan, was a sergeant in the British Army and is believed to have been killed in South Africa in the Eighth Kaffir War (1850–1853). Cullinan was born in Elands Post near Seymore, Cape Colony, on 12 February 1862. Of his early life, his entry in Who's Who says "Education Aliwal North, CP". In 1869, while he was a child, the discovery at a place later known as Kimberley of a diamond called the Star of South Africa spawned a diamond rush. Cullinan moved to Barberton in 1884 and married two years later. In 1887, he moved to Johannesburg. There he became a bricklayer, and after he earned some money, he turned to prospecting. In 1897 he moved to Parktown, the up-and-coming suburb of the Randlords and had The View, his home, built. He discovered the Premier diamond fields in 1898. They lay a considerable distance from the existing diamond fields, but from the find of a diamond on the surface near a farm fence, he deduced that the diamond (found in alluvial soil) must have been washed from some higher diamond-bearing geological position. Such a position presented itself in the shape of a nearby koppie, which concealed a diamond-bearing blue ground pipe.

The owner of the mine, Joachim Prinsloo, had sold land to both gold and diamond prospectors before, and would not sell. However Cullinan succeeded in purchasing the land for £52,000 from Prinsloo's daughter, who inherited the farm after her father's death.

Cullinan was one of the co-founders and chairman of what became the Transvaal Chamber of Industries. He was a member of the Transvaal Legislative Assembly and the first Union Parliament of 1910, representing the Pretoria District North constituency.

He was knighted in 1910, at the inauguration of the Union of South Africa, in recognition of his contribution to industrial development in South Africa. The investiture was carried out by the Duke of Connaught, representing King George V.

Cullinan died in 1936, aged 74.

== Family life ==
Cullinan married a Miss Harding and had a family of ten children. He was the grandfather of Patrick Cullinan, a prominent South African poet.

== See also ==
- South African Irish Regiment
