= Mike Botha =

South African diamond cutter

Mike Botha is a South African Canadian diamond cutter.

== Early life and education ==
Michiel Josias Botha (born 1947) was raised in South Africa.

Botha trained under David du Plessis, and received his cross-working apprenticeship diploma in 1970 in South Africa. He has worked as the occupational certification officer for the diamond industry in the Northwest Territories under the Department of Education, Culture and Employment, and was the technical consultant for the Department of Industry, Tourism and Investment for their Government Diamond Certification Program.

== Career ==
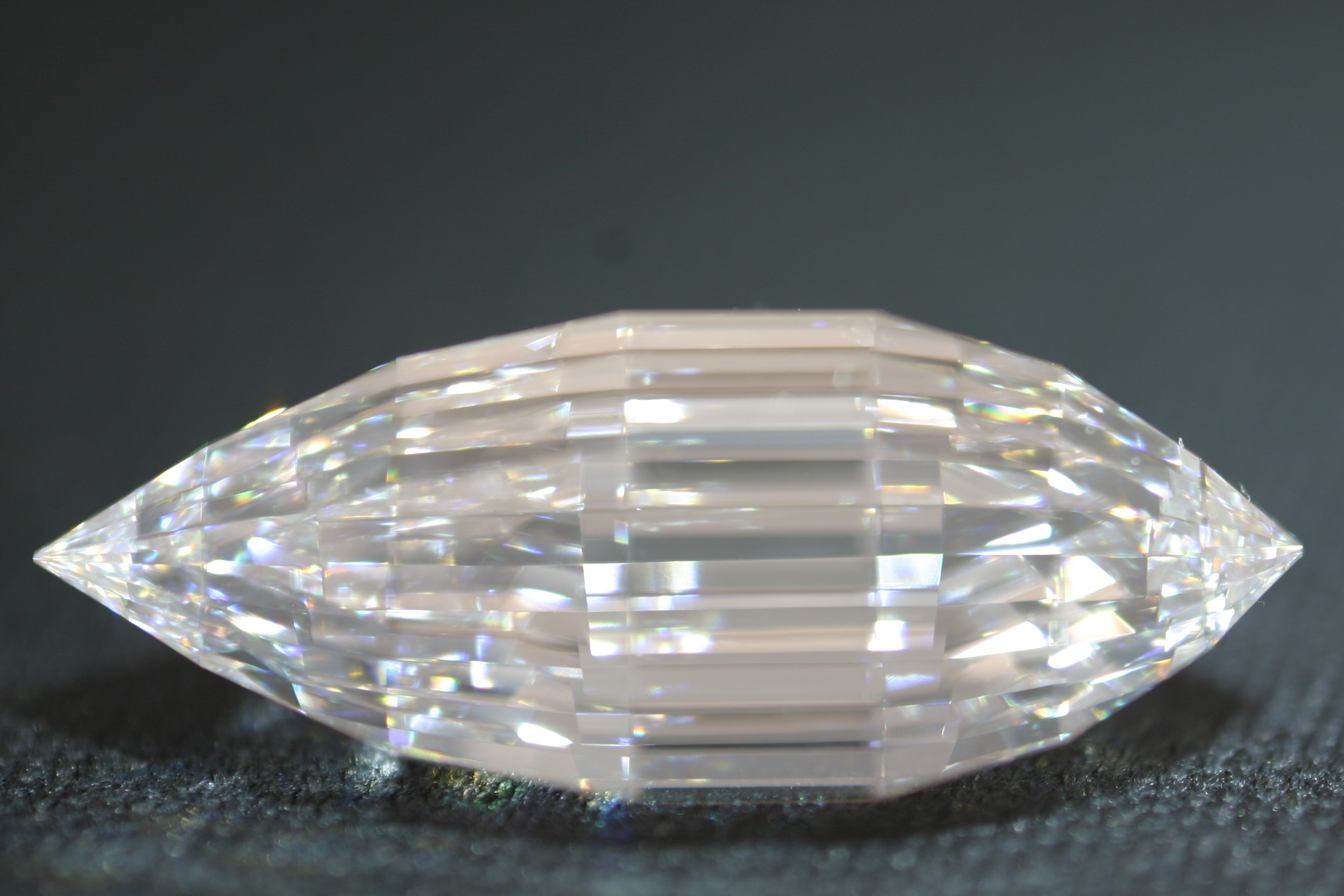
Esperanza Diamond

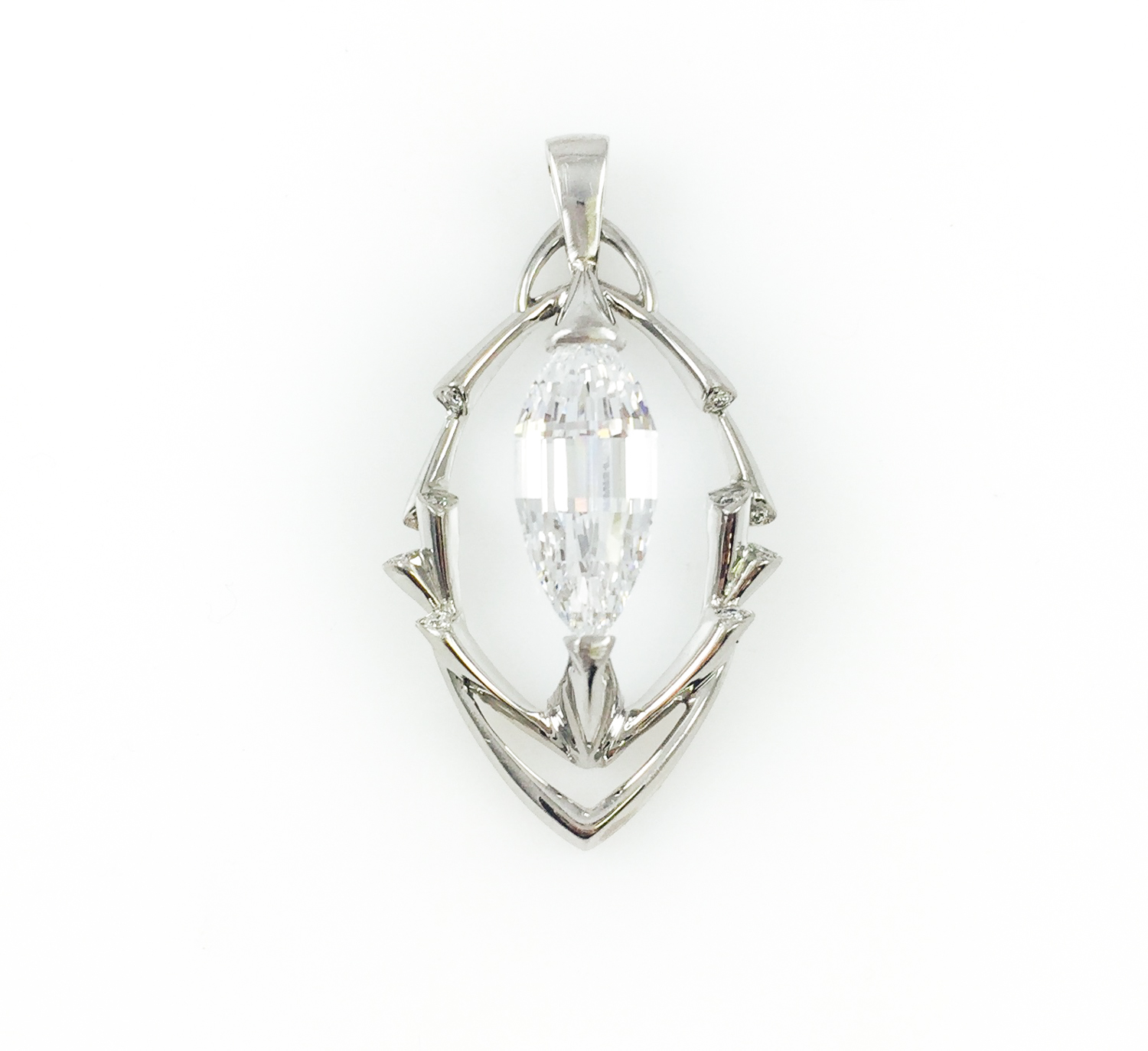
Esperanza Triolette pendant

Botha led the Diamond Training Program at Aurora College in Yellowknife. During his six-year tenure with Aurora College, he developed and delivered programs, earning the college the Yves Landry Award for Outstanding Innovation in Education.

Mike Botha established Embee Diamond Technologies 1998, a diamond design, polishing and finishing source in Canada. Embee Diamond Technologies operates a diamond cutting and polishing atelier in Prince Albert, SK.

Botha has cut and polished large diamonds including one of the diamonds in the Premier Rose Diamond collection- the Premier (baby) Rose diamond, weighing 353.9 carats (70.78 g) in its rough state along with Willem Joubert. He was commissioned to cut the 8.52ct Esperanza Diamond discovered at the Crater of Diamonds State Park in Arkansas to the custom-designed 4.605ct Esperanza Triolette, designed by Botha.

In 1998, Botha was asked to cut several large diamonds for Diagem International including two 100-carat (20 g) diamonds and one 314-carat (62.8 g) diamond. These are the largest gems ever cut and polished in Canada to date.

In January 2012, Mike Botha was presented with an Award of Merit, the city of Prince Albert's highest honour from mayor Jim Scarrow.

Botha has designed numerous diamonds including the Sirius Star, which is licensed to Dharmanandan Diamonds. More recently, he co-invented the Floeting Diamond with Ian Douglas.

== Personal life ==
He married Susanna in 1970. They have a daughter, Myra and a son, Evert.
