= Pretoria District (House of Assembly of South Africa constituency) =

- Pretoria-Distrik
- Former constituency for the South African House of Assembly
- Province: Transvaal
- Electorate: 15,144 (1970)

Former constituency
- Created: 1929
- Abolished: 1974
- Number of members: 1
- Last MHA: C. J. Reinecke (NP)
- Created from: Pretoria District North; Pretoria District South

Pretoria District (Afrikaans: Pretoria-Distrik) was a constituency in the Transvaal Province of South Africa, which existed from 1929 to 1974. It covered a rural area surrounding Pretoria, the administrative capital of South Africa. Throughout its existence it elected one member to the House of Assembly and one to the Transvaal Provincial Council.

== Franchise notes ==
When the Union of South Africa was formed in 1910, the electoral qualifications in use in each pre-existing colony were kept in place. In the Transvaal Colony, and its predecessor the South African Republic, the vote was restricted to white men, and as such, elections in the Transvaal Province were held on a whites-only franchise from the beginning. The franchise was also restricted by property and education qualifications until the 1933 general election, following the passage of the Women's Enfranchisement Act, 1930 and the Franchise Laws Amendment Act, 1931. From then on, the franchise was given to all white citizens aged 21 or over. Non-whites remained disenfranchised until the end of apartheid and the introduction of universal suffrage in 1994.

== History ==
Pretoria District was created in 1929 by merging the pre-existing seats of Pretoria District North and South, and its first MP, Harm Oost of the National Party, had previously represented Pretoria District North. Like most of the rural Transvaal, it was a conservative seat with a largely Afrikaans-speaking electorate, and for most of its history it was a safe seat for the NP. The exception was during the 1930s and 40s, when the bulk of the NP was absorbed into the United Party. Oost, like party leader J. B. M. Hertzog, initially joined the new party, but bolted from it after South Africa joined World War II in 1939. He joined the Afrikaner Party under Nicolaas Havenga, and like all that party's candidates, lost re-election in 1943. In 1948, however, the party made a pact with the Herenigde Nasionale Party, and was able to elect nine MPs - including Oost - to parliament. The parties merged in 1951, essentially recreating the National Party in its pre-1934 form, and the party held Pretoria District for the remainder of the seat's existence.

== Members ==
Election	Member	Party
1929	Harm Oost	National
1933	Harm Oost	National
1934	Harm Oost	United
1938	Harm Oost	United
1940	Harm Oost	Afrikaner
1943	W. B. J. Prinsloo	United
1948	Harm Oost	Afrikaner
1951	Harm Oost	National
1953	J. F. Schoonbee	National
1958	J. F. Schoonbee	National
1961	J. F. Schoonbee	National
1966	C. J. Reinecke	National
1970	C. J. Reinecke	National
1974	Constituency abolished	

== Detailed results ==
=== Elections in the 1920s ===
General election 1929: Pretoria District
Party	Candidate	Votes	%	±%
National	Harm Oost	1,198	60.7	New
South African	F. A. G. Wolmarans	760	38.5	New
Rejected ballots		17	0.8	N/A
Majority		438	12.2	N/A
Turnout		1,975	81.2	N/A
National win (new seat)				

=== Elections in the 1930s ===
General election 1933: Pretoria District
Party	Candidate	Votes	%	±%
National	Harm Oost	Unopposed		
National hold				

General election 1938: Pretoria District
Party	Candidate	Votes	%	±%
United	Harm Oost	2,554	55.3	N/A
Purified National	J. J. Erasmus	2,027	43.9	New
Rejected ballots		40	0.8	N/A
Majority		527	11.4	N/A
Turnout		4,621	83.2	N/A
United hold		Swing	N/A	
