= Centenary Diamond =

274-carat diamond

- Weight: 273.85 carats (54.770 g)
- Color: Grade D colorless
- Cut: Modified heart-shaped brilliant
- Country of origin: South Africa
- Mine of origin: Premier Mine
- Discovered: 17 July 1986
- Cut by: Gabi Tolkowsky, Jim Nash and Geoff Woolett
- Original owner: De Beers
- Owner: Unknown
- Estimated value: at least USD 90 million

The De Beers Centenary Diamond is, at 273.85 carats (54.770 g), the third-largest diamond to have been produced in the Premier Mine. Among top-color diamonds, only the Cullinan I and II are larger than the Centenary diamond. The Centenary Diamond is rated in color as grade D color by the Gemological Institute of America, which is the highest grade of colourless diamond and is internally and externally flawless. It was named the Centenary Diamond as it was presented in the rough for the Centennial Celebration of De Beers Consolidated Mines on 11 May 1988. The Centenary Diamond was unveiled in final form in May 1991.

== Discovery ==
The Centenary Diamond was discovered in the Premier Mine on 17 July 1986 using their X-ray imaging system. The original rough was 599 carats (119.8 g) and it was presented on 11 May 1988 in the Centennial Celebration of the De Beers Consolidated Mines. As then-chairman Julian Ogilvie Thompson said, "We have recovered at the Premier Mine a diamond of 599 carats (119.8 g) which is perfect in colour – indeed it is one of the largest top-colour diamonds ever found. Naturally it will be called the Centenary Diamond."

== Cutting the Centenary ==
Cutting such an immense and valuable diamond required expertise and a considerable investment. Gabi Tolkowsky was chosen to head the team responsible for cutting the Centenary Diamond, along with Geoff Woolett, Jim Nash and Dawie du Plessis, assisted by a specially-picked group of engineers, electricians and security guards to facilitate in the work on Centenary Diamond. There was a special room designed underground in the De Beers Diamond Research Laboratory in Johannesburg, South Africa for the sole purpose of working on the Centenary Diamond with design specifications including strength and stability so as to preclude mechanical vibration and temperature variation to minimise any factor that might interfere with the cutting of the Centenary Diamond.

The initial efforts were done by hand rather than with a laser or saw so as not to heat or vibrate the diamond. After cutting and removing 50 carats (10 g) of cracked material over 154 days, the team was left with an egg-shaped gem of approximately 500 carats (100 g). Thirteen different designs were presented to the De Beers board, with a strong recommendation for what became the eventual modified heart-shaped design. The shape was described as, "Effectively, the Centenary Diamond is shaped like a heart-shape, but it does not have a groove. The image the team had in mind was a shape which would adorn the crown of an Indian Maharaja."

== Statistics ==
The Centenary was completed in February 1991, weighing 273.85 carats (54.770 g) with its dimensions measuring 39.90 × 50.50 × 24.55 mm. The final gem had 247 facets: 164 on the pavilion and crown, and 83 on the girdle. While the stone has never been publicly appraised for value, it is known to have been insured at over US$100 million at the time of its unveiling in May 1991. The stone was loaned to the Tower of London, where it was displayed for a number of years. It is believed that De Beers no longer owns the Centenary, but the current owner is unknown. De Beers declines to comment, citing its anonymity policy.

== See also ==
- List of diamonds
