= List of diamond magnates =

This is an annotated list of important diamond business magnates. It is in alphabetical order based on last name.

- Barney Barnato (1851–1897), British Randlord and diamond magnate
- Alfred Beit (1853–1906), Anglo-German gold and diamond magnate
- Thomas Cullinan (diamond magnate) (1862–1936), South African diamond magnate.
- David Harris (South African businessman) (1852–1942), South African soldier, diamond magnate, and legislator
- John Dale Lace (1859–1937), South African gold and diamond magnate.
- Lev Avnerovich Leviev (born 1956), Israeli diamond magnate, investor, and philanthropist
- William McHardy (diamond magnate) (1846–1913), Scottish-South African diamond magnate
- Cecil Rhodes (1853–1902), British mining magnate and politician
- Maurice Tempelsman (1929–2025), Belgian-American businessman, a diamond magnate, and merchant
- Sir Harold Wernher, 3rd Baronet (1893–1973), British military officer and diamond magnate
- Sir Julius Wernher, 1st Baronet (1850–1912), German-born Randlord, diamond magnate, and art collector
