= Premier Mine =

Diamond mine near Pretoria, South Africa

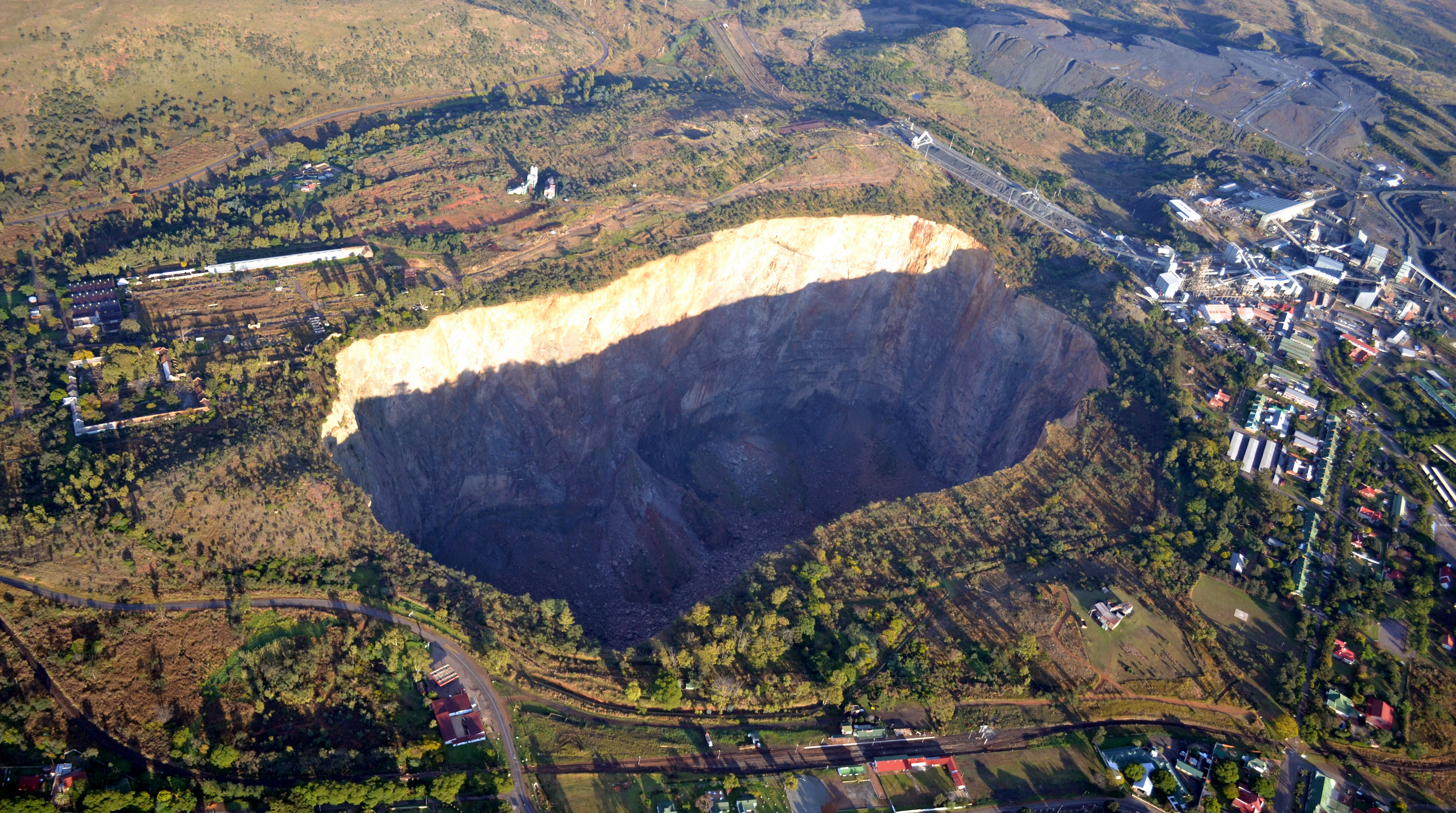
- The open pit, 2011

- Location of mine within South Africa
- Location: Cullinan, Gauteng, South Africa; 25°40′21″S 28°30′45″E
- Products: Diamonds
- Type: Underground
- Opened: 1902
- Company: Petra Diamonds Cullinan Consortium

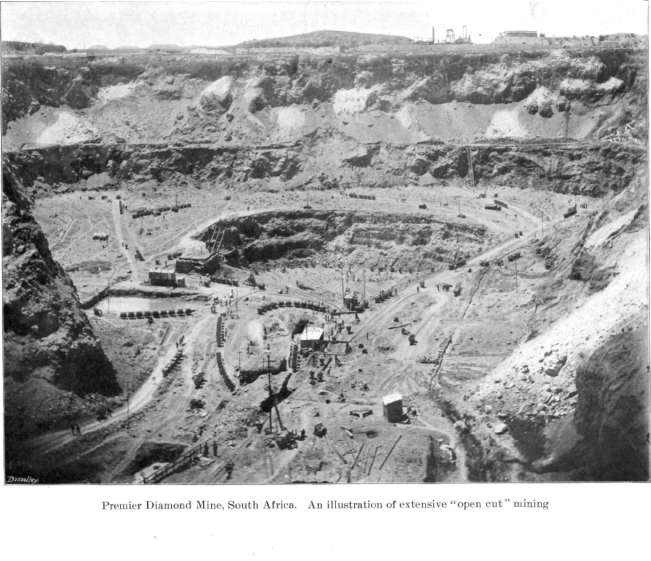
Premier Mine, South Africa, before 1903

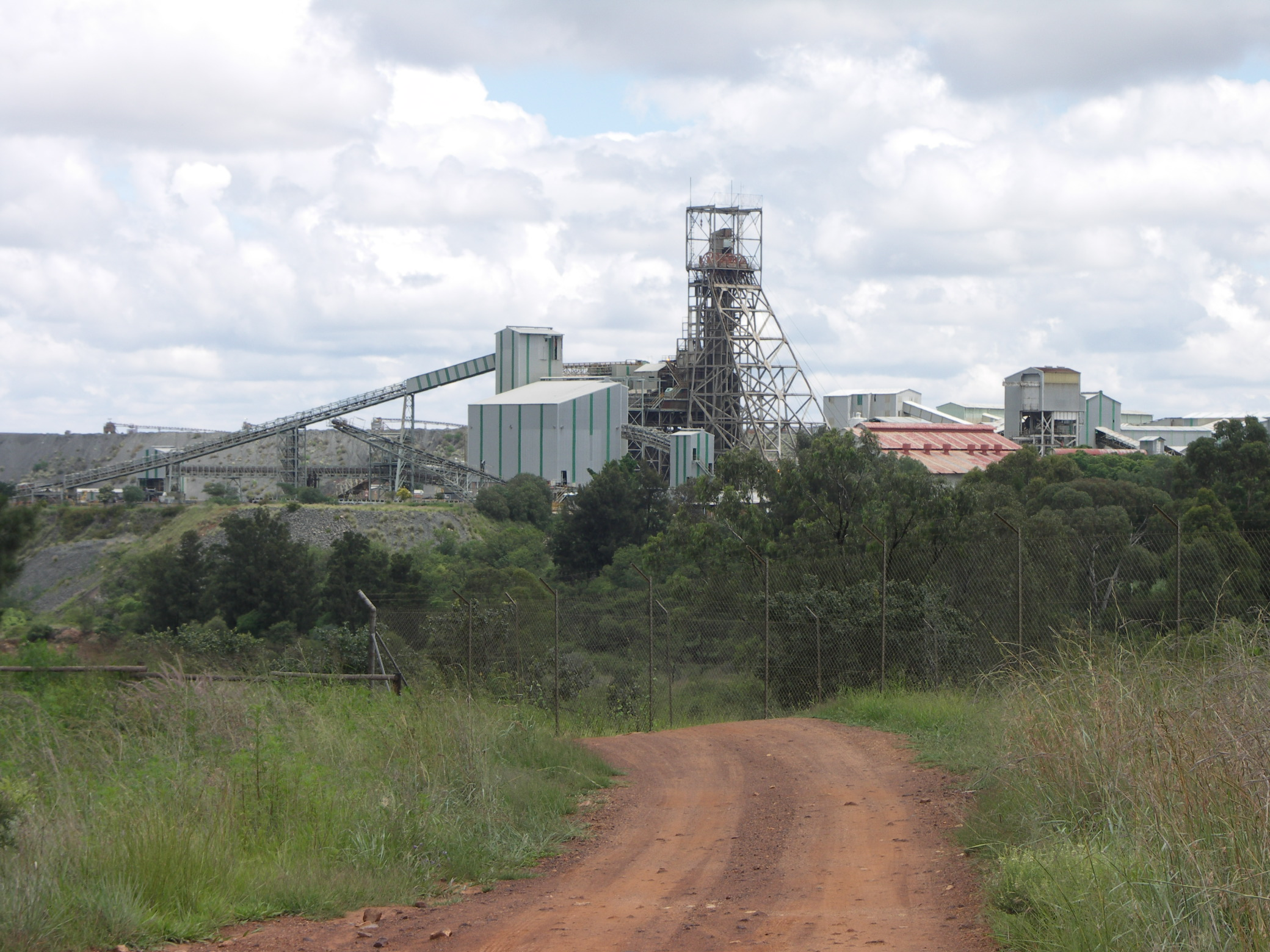
Headframe and plant, 2006

The Premier Mine is an underground diamond mine owned by Petra Diamonds in the town of Cullinan, 40 kilometres (25 mi) east of Pretoria, Gauteng Province, South Africa. Established in 1902, it was renamed the Cullinan Diamond Mine in November 2003 in celebration of its centenary. The mine is a carrot-shaped volcanic pipe and has a surface area of 32 hectares (79 acres). The mine rose to prominence in 1905, when the Cullinan Diamond – the largest rough diamond of gem quality ever found – was discovered there.

The mine has produced over 750 stones that are greater than 100 carats (20 g) and more than a quarter of all the world's diamonds that are greater than 400 carats (80 g). It is also the only significant source of blue diamonds in the world.

== Notable discoveries ==
The Cullinan Diamond is the largest rough gem-quality diamond ever found, at 3,106.75 carats (621.350 g). It was found by Frederick Wells, surface manager of the Premier Diamond Mining Company in Cullinan, Gauteng, South Africa, on 25 January 1905. The stone was named after Sir Thomas Cullinan, the owner of the diamond mine.

There have been various other notable diamonds that have been recovered from Premier Mine. These include:

- The Premier Rose – 353 carats (70.6 g) rough
- The Niarchos – 426 carats (85.2 g) rough
- The De Beers Centenary – 275 carats (55.0 g) rough
- Golden Jubilee Diamond – 755 carats (151.0 g) rough
- Taylor-Burton Diamond – 69 carats (13.8 g) polished

In May 2008, a sparkling shield-shaped 101.27-carat (20.254 g) diamond (about the size of a ping pong ball) mined from the Premier Mine sold for more than US$6.2 million at Christie's in Hong Kong. Cut from a 460 carats (92 g) rough, the shield-shaped gem boasts 92 brilliant facets. While internally flawless, the stone has a slight imperfection on the surface that is imperceptible to the human eye, the auction house said. It is the largest colourless diamond to appear on the auction market in the last 18 years, Christie's said. Only three diamonds of more than 100 carats (20 g) have appeared at auction. All were sold in Geneva. Naming rights were granted to the new owner.

In September 2009, a 507-carat (101.4 g) diamond was found, and is ranked as one of the 20 biggest high quality diamonds ever discovered. Petra Diamonds sold it for $35.3 million on 26 February 2010, breaking a record as the highest price ever paid for a rough diamond.

On 18 April 2013 a 25.5-carat (5.10 g) blue rough diamond was recovered by Petra Diamonds at its Cullinan mine. According to experts it could be worth more than $10m. The find gave a boost to Petra's share price. The mine has produced hundreds of large stones and is famed for its production of blue diamonds. A similar 26.6-carat (5.32 g) blue rough diamond recovered by Petra in May 2009 was cut into a near perfect stone and fetched just under $10m at Sotheby's. Another deep-blue diamond from Cullinan was auctioned for $10.8m last year and set a world record for the value per carat.

On 21 January 2014, Petra Diamonds announced recovery of a 29.6-carat (5.92 g) blue diamond. According to the current CEO, Johan Dippenaar, it is the "most significant blue diamond" to be recovered by Petra Diamonds. According to Analyst Cailey Barker at broker Numis it "could fetch between $15m and $20m at auction". Decision on what is to be done with the stone will come next week.

On 13 June 2014, Petra Diamonds announced that a blue diamond of 122.52 carats (24.504 g) was found at the Cullinan mine. The diamond, though not yet appraised, is expected to fetch more than 35 million dollars, which was the approximate value of the Heritage Diamond, also found in that mine. Petra Diamonds says that the diamond will not be put up for auction before their fiscal year ends this month.

== Purchase by Petra Diamonds ==
On 22 November 2007, De Beers, the world's largest diamond producer, announced that it had entered into an agreement to sell the Cullinan mine for R1 billion (US$125 million) to Petra Diamonds Cullinan Consortium (PDCC), a consortium of:

- Petra Diamonds – 37% stake, with an option to increase to 60%
- Al Rajhi Holdings W.L.L. – 37% stake
- A Black Economic Empowerment foundation – 26% stake, comprising a 12% stake held by an employee share trust and a 14% stake held by Thembinkosi Mining Investments (Pty) Ltd

On 16 July 2008, Petra announced the completion of the acquisition.
