= Asian Institute of Gemological Sciences =

Thai gemological school and laboratory

The Asian Institute of Gemological Sciences (AIGS) is a private gemological school and gemological laboratory based in Bangkok, Thailand.

== History ==
The AIGS was founded in 1978 and was Thailand's first educational facility devoted to the study of gemstones. The school and the laboratory are located in the Jewelry Trade Center, on Silom Road, in the heart of the gem and jewellery district of Bangkok.

The AIGS school offers an Accredited Gemologist (A.G.) diploma (in Thai or English language) including "gemstone identification", "gemstone grading and pricing", "synthetics and treatments identification", and "diamonds". It also offers short courses such as introduction to gemology and jewelry design. With about 15,000 graduates from all over the world, it is one of the leading Gemological institutes in Southeast Asia.

The AIGS Gemological Laboratory was the first professional Gemological laboratory to be established in Asia (1978). It is a member of the Thai Gem and Jewelry Traders Association (TGJTA), and the International Colored Gemstone Association (ICA). The AIGS Gem Laboratory is very well known for its expertise in colored gemstones, especially ruby, sapphire, emerald, jade and rare stones, but it also provides identification and grading services for diamonds and jewelry.
