= Cullinan Diamond =

Largest gem-quality diamond ever discovered

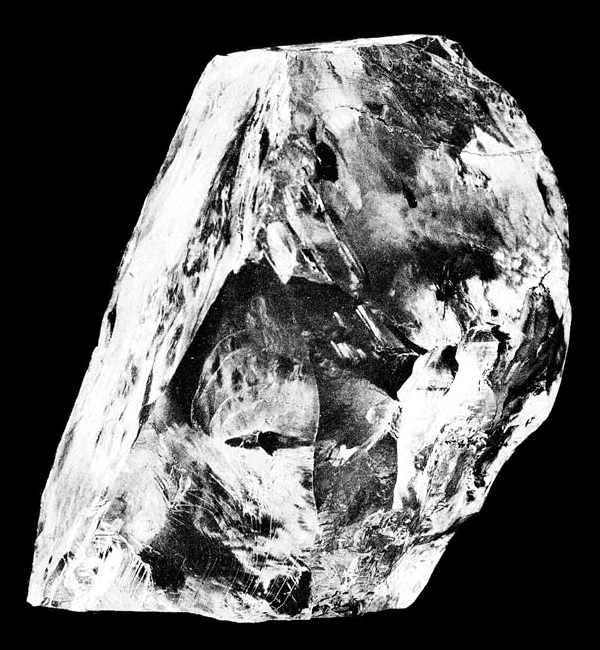
- The rough diamond
- Weight: 3,106 carats (621.2 g)
- Colour: Near colourless
- Cut: 105 stones of assorted cuts
- Country of origin: South Africa
- Mine of origin: Premier Mine
- Discovered: 26 January 1905
- Cut by: Joseph Asscher & Co.
- Original owner: Premier Diamond Mining Company
- Owner: Charles III in right of The Crown

The Cullinan Diamond is the largest gem-quality rough diamond ever found, weighing 3,106 carats (621.20 g), discovered at the Premier No.2 mine in Cullinan, South Africa, on 26 January 1905. It was named after Thomas Cullinan, the owner of the mine. In April 1905, it was put on sale in London, but despite considerable interest, it was still unsold after two years. In 1907, the Transvaal Colony government bought the Cullinan and Prime Minister Louis Botha presented it to Edward VII. It was then cut by Joseph Asscher & Co. in Amsterdam.

Cullinan produced stones of various cuts and sizes, the largest of which is named Cullinan I, and named the Great Star of Africa by Edward VII, and at 530.4 carats (106.08 g) it is the largest cut clear-diamond in the world. The stone is mounted in the head of the Sovereign's Sceptre with Cross. The second largest cut clear-diamond is Cullinan II or the Second Star of Africa, weighing 317.4 carats (63.48 g), mounted in the Imperial State Crown. Both are part of the Crown Jewels of the United Kingdom. Seven other major diamonds, weighing a total of 208.29 carats (41.66 g), were privately owned by Elizabeth II, who inherited them from her grandmother, Queen Mary, in 1953. The Queen also owned minor brilliants and a set of unpolished fragments.

== Discovery and early history ==
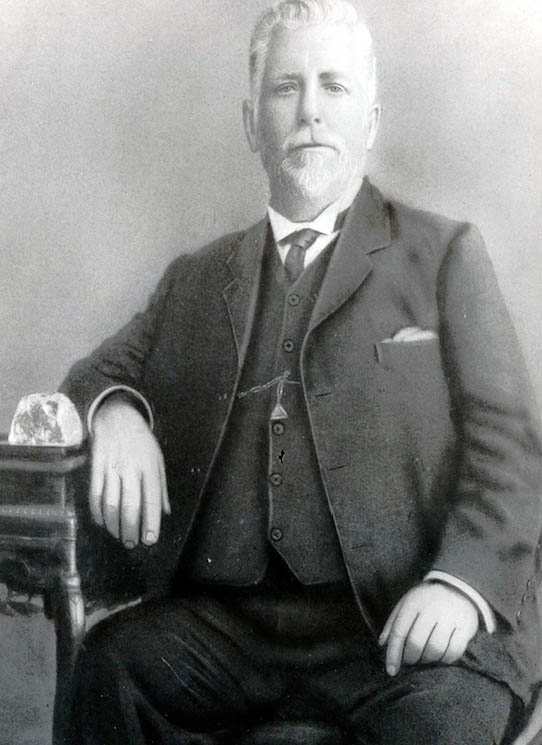
Frederick Wells, mine manager, with the diamond

The Cullinan is estimated to have formed in Earth's mantle transition zone at a depth of 410–660 km (250–410 mi) and reached the surface 1.18 billion years ago. It was found 5.5 metres (18 ft) below the surface at Premier Mine in Cullinan, Transvaal Colony, by Frederick Wells, surface manager at the mine, on 26 January 1905. It was approximately 10.1 centimetres (4.0 in) long, 6.35 centimetres (2.50 in) wide, 5.9 centimetres (2.3 in) deep, and weighed 3,106 carats (621.2 grams). Newspapers called it the "Cullinan Diamond", a reference to Sir Thomas Cullinan, who opened the mine in 1902. It was three times the size of the Excelsior Diamond, found in 1893 at Jagersfontein Mine, weighing 972 carats (194.4 g). Four of its eight surfaces were smooth, indicating that it once had been part of a much larger stone broken up by natural forces. It had a blue-white hue and contained a small pocket of air, which at certain angles produced a rainbow, or Newton's rings.

Shortly after its discovery, Cullinan went on public display at the Standard Bank in Johannesburg, where it was seen by an estimated 8,000–9,000 visitors. In April 1905, the rough gem was deposited with Premier Mining Co.'s London sales agent, S. Neumann & Co. Due to its immense value, detectives were assigned to the RMS Kenilworth Castle that was rumoured to be carrying the stone, and a parcel was ceremoniously locked in the captain's safe and guarded on the entire journey. It was a diversionary tactic – the stone on that ship was fake, meant to attract those who would be interested in stealing it. Cullinan was sent to the United Kingdom in a plain box via registered post. On arriving in London, it was conveyed to Buckingham Palace for inspection by King Edward VII. Although it drew considerable interest from potential buyers, Cullinan went unsold for two years.

=== Presentation to Edward VII ===
Transvaal Prime Minister Louis Botha suggested buying the diamond for Edward VII as "a token of the loyalty and attachment of the people of the Transvaal to His Majesty's throne and person". In August 1907, a vote was held in the Legislative Council on the Cullinan's fate, and a motion authorising the purchase was carried by 42 votes in favour to 19 against. Initially, Henry Campbell-Bannerman, then British Prime Minister, advised the king to decline the offer, but he later decided to let Edward VII choose whether or not to accept the gift. Eventually, he was persuaded by Winston Churchill, then Colonial Under-Secretary. For his trouble, Churchill was sent a replica, which he enjoyed showing off to guests on a silver plate. The Transvaal Colony government bought the diamond on 17 October 1907 for £150,000, which adjusted for pound-sterling inflation is equivalent to £21 million in 2024. Due to a 60% tax on mining profits, the Treasury received some of its money back from the Premier Diamond Mining Company.

The diamond was presented to the king at Sandringham House by Agent-General of the colony, Sir Richard Solomon, on 9 November 1907 – his 66th birthday – in the presence of a large party of guests, including the Queen of Sweden, the Queen of Spain, the Duke of Westminster and Lord Revelstoke. The king asked his colonial secretary, Lord Elgin, to announce that he accepted the gift "for myself and my successors" and that he would ensure "this great and unique diamond be kept and preserved among the historic jewels which form the heirlooms of the Crown".

=== Cutting process ===
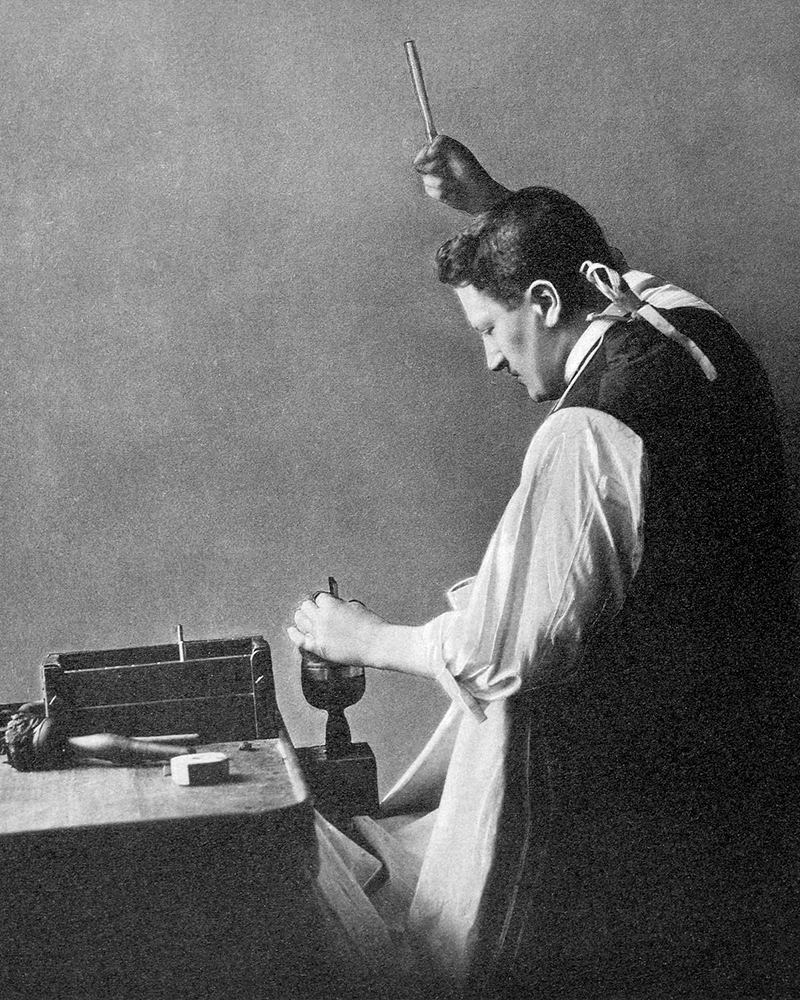
Joseph Asscher making the split

The king chose Joseph Asscher & Co. of Amsterdam to cleave and polish the rough stone into brilliant gems of various cuts and sizes. Abraham Asscher collected it from the Colonial Office in London on 23 January 1908. He returned to the Netherlands by train and ferry with the diamond in his coat pocket. Meanwhile, to much fanfare, a Royal Navy ship carried an empty box across the North Sea, again throwing off potential thieves. Even the captain was unaware that his "precious" cargo was a decoy.

On 10 February 1908, the rough stone was split in half by Joseph Asscher at his diamond-cutting factory in Amsterdam. At the time, technology had not yet evolved to guarantee the quality of modern standards, and cutting the diamond was difficult and risky. After weeks of planning, an incision 0.5 inches (13 mm) deep was made to enable Asscher to cleave the diamond in one blow. Making the incision alone took four days, and a steel knife broke on the first attempt, but a second knife was fitted into the groove and split the stone cleanly in two along one of four possible cleavage planes. In all, splitting and cutting the diamond took eight months, with three people working 14 hours per day to complete the task.

"The tale is told of Joseph Asscher, the greatest cleaver of the day," wrote Matthew Hart in his book Diamond: A Journey to the Heart of an Obsession (2002), "that when he prepared to cleave the largest diamond ever known … he had a doctor and nurse standing by and when he finally struck the diamond … he fainted dead away". Ian Balfour, in his book Famous Diamonds (2009), dispels the fainting story, suggesting it was more likely Joseph would have celebrated, opening a bottle of champagne. When Joseph's nephew Louis heard the story, he exclaimed "No Asscher would ever faint over any operation on any diamond".

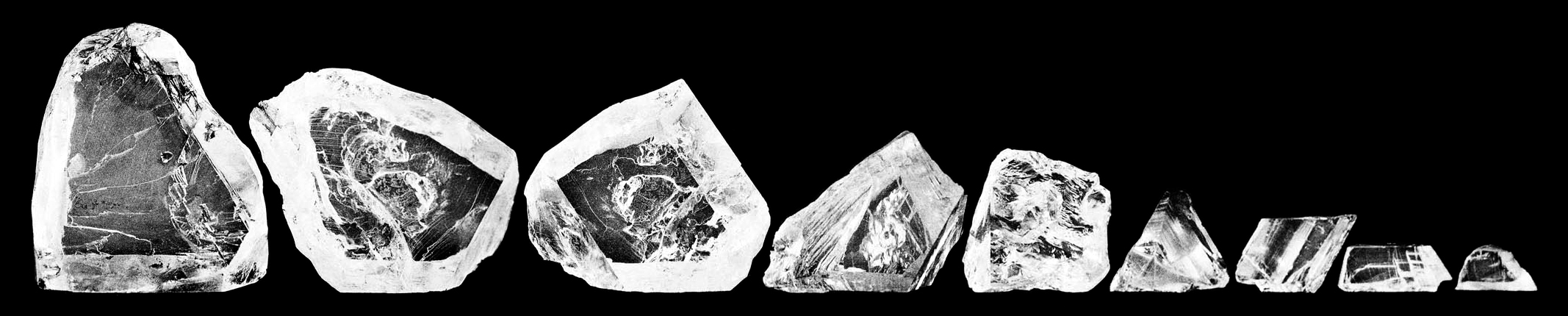
Nine largest stones split from the rough Cullinan diamond

== Diamonds cut from the Cullinan ==
Cullinan produced 9 major stones totalling 1,055.89 carats (211.178 g), plus 96 minor brilliants and some unpolished fragments weighing 19.5 carats (3.90 g). All but the two largest stones – Cullinans I and II – remained in Amsterdam by arrangement as the fee for Asscher's services, until the South African government bought and presented them to Queen Mary on 28 June 1910 (except Cullinan VI, which Edward VII had purchased and given to his wife Queen Alexandra in 1907). On Alexandra's death in 1925, Mary inherited Cullinan VI, and she left Cullinans III to IX to her granddaughter Elizabeth II in 1953. Cullinans I and II are part of the Crown Jewels, which belong to the monarch in right of the Crown.

The South African government also bought the minor brilliants from Asscher and distributed them to Queen Mary; Louis Botha, the then prime minister of South Africa; the diamond merchants Arthur and Alexander Levy, who supervised the cutting of Cullinan; and Jacob Romijn (later Romyn), who co-founded the first trade union in the diamond industry. Some were set by Mary into a long platinum chain, which Elizabeth II never wore in public, saying that "it gets in the soup". In the 1960s, two minor Cullinan diamonds owned by Louis Botha's heirs were analysed at the De Beers laboratory in Johannesburg and found to be completely free of nitrogen or any other impurities. Cullinans I and II were examined in the 1980s by gemologists at the Tower of London and both graded as colourless type IIa.

=== Cullinan I ===
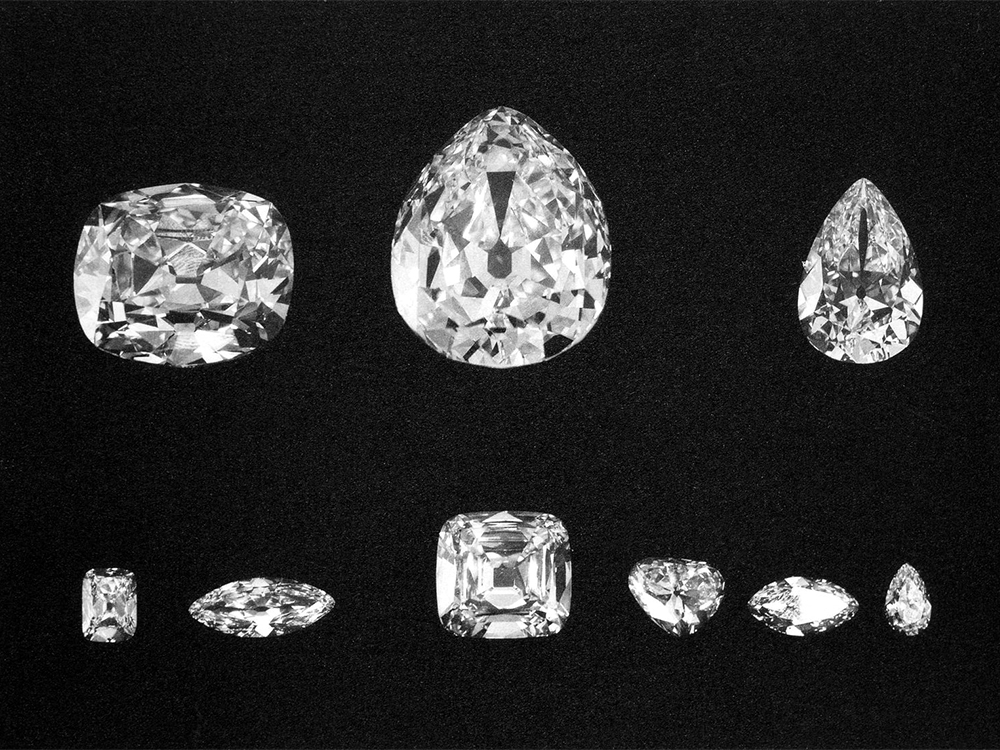
The nine major stones. Top: Cullinans II, I, and III. Bottom: Cullinans VIII, VI, IV, V, VII and IX.

Cullinan I, or the Great Star of Africa, is a pendeloque cut brilliant weighing 530.2 carats (106 g) and has 74 facets. It is set at the top of the Sovereign's Sceptre with Cross, made in 1661, which had to be redesigned in 1910 to accommodate it. Cullinan I was surpassed as the world's largest cut diamond by the 545.67-carat (109 g) brown Golden Jubilee Diamond in 1992, which was surpassed in 2025 by the 612.24-carat (122 g) Black Falcon. Cullinan I remains the largest colourless cut diamond in the world. In terms of clarity, it has a few tiny cleavages and a small patch of graining. The 5.89 cm × 4.54 cm × 2.77 cm (2.32 in × 1.79 in × 1.09 in) diamond is fitted with loops and can be taken out of its setting to be worn as a pendant suspended from Cullinan II to make a brooch. Queen Mary, wife of George V, often wore it like this. In 1908, the stone was valued at US$2.5 million (equivalent to US$61 million in 2024) – two and a half times the rough Cullinan's estimated value.

=== Cullinan II ===
Cullinan II, or the Second Star of Africa, is a cushion-cut brilliant with 66 facets weighing 317.4 carats (63.48 g) set in the front of the Imperial State Crown, below the Black Prince's Ruby (a large red spinel). It measures 4.54 cm × 4.08 cm × 2.42 cm (1.79 in × 1.61 in × 0.95 in). The diamond has a number of tiny flaws, scratches on the table facet, and a small chip at the girdle. Like Cullinan I, it is held in place by a yellow gold enclosure, which is screwed onto the crown.

=== Cullinan III ===
Cullinan III, or the Lesser Star of Africa, is pear-cut and weighs 94.4 carats (18.88 g). In 1911 Queen Mary, wife and queen consort of George V, had it set in the top cross pattée of a crown that she personally bought for her coronation. In 1912 the Delhi Durbar Tiara, worn the previous year by Mary instead of a crown at the Delhi Durbar, where her husband wore the Imperial Crown of India, was also adapted to take Cullinans III and IV. Elizabeth II frequently wore Cullinan III in combination with Cullinan IV as a brooch. In total, the brooch is 6.5 cm (2.6 in) long and 2.4 cm (0.94 in) wide. Cullinan III has also been used as a pendant on the Coronation Necklace, where it occasionally replaced the 22.4-carat (4.48 g) Lahore Diamond.

=== Cullinan IV ===
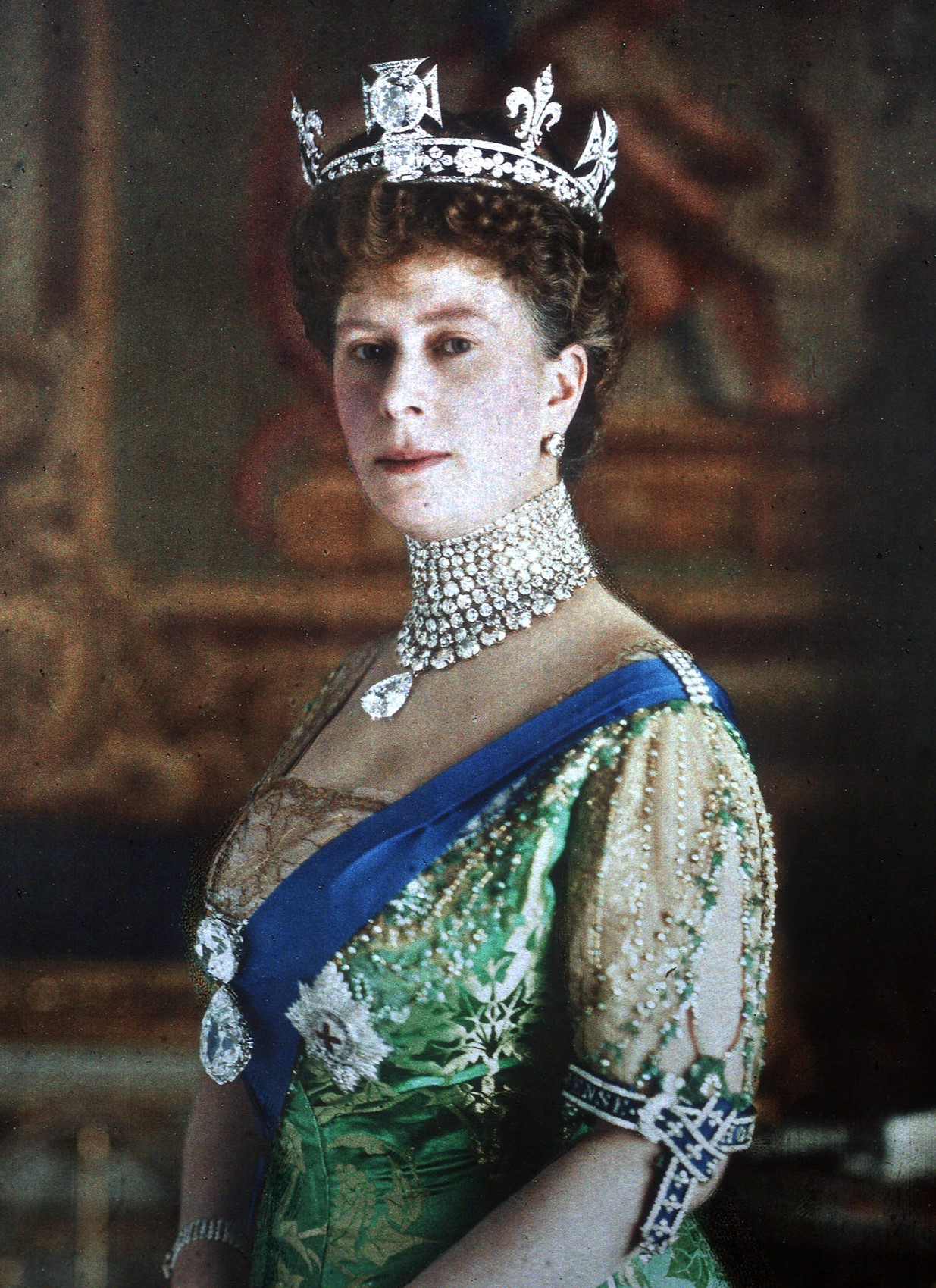
Queen Mary wearing Cullinans I and II as a brooch, III as a pendant on the Coronation Necklace, and IV in the base of her crown, below the Koh-i-Noor

Cullinan IV, also referred to as a Lesser Star of Africa, is square-cut and weighs 63.6 carats (12.72 g). In 1911 it was first set in the base of Queen Mary's Crown. In 1914 both III and IV were replaced with crystal replicas, until 2023, when the diamonds were re-set in the crown for use by Queen Camilla. On 25 March 1958, while she and Prince Philip were on a state visit to the Netherlands, Queen Elizabeth II revealed that Cullinan III and IV are known in her family as "Granny's Chips". They visited the Asscher Diamond Company, where Cullinan had been cut 50 years earlier. It was the first time the Queen had worn the brooch publicly. During her visit, she unpinned the brooch and offered it for examination to Louis Asscher, nephew of Joseph Asscher, who split the rough diamond. Aged 84, he was deeply moved that the Queen had brought the diamonds with her, knowing how much it would mean to him seeing them again after so many years.

=== Cullinan V ===
Cullinan V is an 18.8-carat (3.76 g) heart-shaped diamond set in the centre of a platinum brooch that formed a part of the stomacher made for Queen Mary to wear at the Delhi Durbar in 1911. The brooch was designed to show off Cullinan V and is pavé-set with a border of smaller diamonds. It can be suspended from the VIII brooch and can be used to suspend the VII pendant. It was often worn like this by Mary. In May 2023, the brooch was placed on the front cross of Queen Mary's Crown for the Coronation of Queen Camilla instead of the traditional and controversial Koh-i-Noor.

=== Cullinan VI ===
Cullinan VI is marquise-cut and weighs 11.5 carats (2.30 g). It hangs from the brooch containing Cullinan VIII and forming part of the stomacher of the Delhi Durbar parure. Cullinan VI along with VIII can also be fitted together to make yet another brooch, surrounded by some 96 smaller diamonds. The design was created around the same time that the Cullinan V heart-shaped brooch was designed, both having a similar shape.

=== Cullinan VII ===
Cullinan VII is also marquise-cut and weighs 8.8 carats (1.76 g). It was originally given by Edward VII to his wife and consort Queen Alexandra. After his death she gave the jewel to Queen Mary, who had it set as a pendant hanging from the diamond-and-emerald Delhi Durbar necklace, part of the parure.

=== Cullinan VIII ===
Cullinan VIII is an oblong-cut diamond weighing 6.8 carats (1.36 g). It is set in the centre of a brooch forming part of the stomacher of the Delhi Durbar parure. Together with Cullinan VI it forms a brooch.

=== Cullinan IX ===
Cullinan IX is smallest of the principal diamonds to be obtained from the rough Cullinan. It is a pendeloque or stepped pear-cut stone, weighs 4.39 carats (0.878 g), and is set in a platinum ring known as the Cullinan IX Ring.

== See also ==
- List of diamonds
- List of largest rough diamonds
- Elizabeth II's jewels

== General and cited references ==
- Balfour, Ian (2009). Famous Diamonds. Antique Collectors' Club. ISBN 978-1-85149-479-8.
- Bariand, Pierre; Duchamp, Michel (1992). The Larousse Encyclopedia of Precious Gems. Van Nostrand Reinhold. ISBN 978-0-442-30289-4.
- Cartwright, Alan Patrick (1977). Diamonds and Clay. Purnell. ISBN 978-0-868-43017-1.
- Crookes, William (1909). Diamonds. Harper & Brothers. ASIN B0114VJCD4.
- Dickinson, Joan Y. (2012). The Book of Diamonds. Courier. ISBN 978-0-486-15682-8. Archived from the original on 1 September 2023.
- Field, Leslie (1997). The Queen's Jewels. Harry N. Abrams. ISBN 978-0-8109-8172-0.
- Gorelik, Boris (2015). "The Cullinan Diamond and its true story". Jewellery History Today (Spring): 3–11. Archived from the original on 2 October 2020.
- Hart, Matthew (2002). Diamond: A Journey to the Heart of an Obsession. Plume Books. ISBN 978-0-452-28370-1.
- Hatch, F. H. (April 1905). "A Description of the Big Diamond Recently Found in the Premier Mine, Transvaal". Geological Magazine. 2 (4). Cambridge University Press: 170–172. Bibcode:1905GeoM....2..170H. doi:10.1017/s001675680013198x. S2CID 129350739.
- Helme, Nigel (1974). Thomas Major Cullinan: A Biography. McGraw-Hill. ISBN 978-0-07-091286-1. Archived from the original on 1 September 2023.
- Keay, Anna (2011). The Crown Jewels. Thames & Hudson. ISBN 978-0-500-51575-4. Archived from the original on 24 February 2023.
- Koskoff, David E. (1981). The Diamond World. Harper & Row. ISBN 978-0-06-038005-2.
- Lee, Sidney (1925). King Edward VII: A Biography. Vol. 2. Macmillan. ASIN B00ESCVL04. Archived from the original on 1 September 2023.
- Manutchehr-Danai, Mohsen (2013). Dictionary of Gems and Gemology. Springer Science & Business Media. ISBN 978-3-662-04288-5. Archived from the original on 1 September 2023.
- Mears, Kenneth J. (1988). The Tower of London: 900 Years of English History. Phaidon. ISBN 978-0-7148-2527-4. Archived from the original on 1 September 2023.
- Mears, Kenneth J.; Thurley, Simon; Murphy, Claire (1994). The Crown Jewels. Historic Royal Palaces. ASIN B000HHY1ZQ.
- Morgan, Henry H. (17 October 1908). "Polishing the Great Cullinan Diamond". Scientific American. 99 (16): 262. doi:10.1038/scientificamerican10171908-262.
- Scarratt, Kenneth; Shor, Russell (2006). "The Cullinan Diamond Centennial: A History and Gemological Analysis of Cullinans I and II". Gems & Gemology. 42 (2): 120–132. doi:10.5741/gems.42.2.120.
- Seff, Philip; Seff, Nancy R. (1990). Our Fascinating Earth. McGraw-Hill. ISBN 978-0-8092-4185-9. Archived from the original on 1 September 2023.
- Smith, Evan M.; Shirley, Steven B.; Nestola, Fabrizio; Bullock, Emma S.; Wang, Jianhua; Richardson, Stephen H.; Wang, Wuyi (2016). "Large gem diamonds from metallic liquid in Earth's deep mantle". Science. 354 (6318): 1403–1405. Bibcode:2016Sci...354.1403S. doi:10.1126/science.aal1303. PMID 27980206.
- Spencer, Leonard J. (1910). "Notes on the weight of the 'Cullinan' diamond". Mineralogical Magazine. Vol. XV, no. 71. pp. 318–326.
