= Yair Shimansky =

South African jeweler

Yair Shimansky is a jeweler based in Cape Town, South Africa, specializing in diamonds. He owns several retail stores in South Africa, and operates a diamond cutting and polishing business in Johannesburg, South Africa. Shimansky is known for creating what is claimed to be the world's most expensive temporary tattoo and a 900-carat diamond-encrusted soccer ball for the 2010 FIFA World Cup.

== Brilliant 10 Diamond ==
The Brilliant 10 diamond design is a 71-facet round brilliant cut diamond design developed and patented by Shimansky. After years of research and refinement, Shimansky created this 71-faceted round brilliant cut diamond featuring 10 arrows on the top and 10 hearts on the bottom. This design is claimed to be 25% brighter than other round brilliant cut diamonds.

It's been stated as being the most brilliant diamond in the world. The diamond is currently the only diamond that has no light leakage, in which all of the light that enters through the table and the crown is reflected back. In contrast, a regular round brilliant diamond with 57 facets loses around 8%-12% of light even if cut to ideal proportions, in which the light loss is around the girdle area of the diamond.

== See also ==
- Diamond (mineral)
- Diamond cut
