= Culet =

Bottom protective gemstone facet

Diamond earrings with culets clearly visible through the stones

Diamond proportions and facets, for the round brilliant cut

In gemology, a culet is a flat face on the bottom of a gemstone.

During the 14th century, after the adoption of the table cut, a further facet was added to the bottom of the cut parallel to the surface of the table. The term used for these bottom facets derives from the Latin word for bottom, culus.

The culet is added largely to protect the integrity of the gemstone. On a diamond, the cleavage plane runs parallel to the octahedral faces, and so any damage to the tip of the diamond could cause a split up the entire length of the pavilion. With other gemstones that are not subject to cleavage, the culet is added to protect the fragility of the pointed tip.

The culet has remained optional on many diamond cuts up to the present day, and was omitted from Marcel Tolkowsky's original designs for the round brilliant diamond cut in 1919. Nonetheless, culet facets are common on modern brilliant-cut diamonds.

== Sources ==
- History of lapidary, gemsociety.org
- Gemstone cutting history, khulsey.com
