= Facet =

Flat surface of a gem, crystal, etc

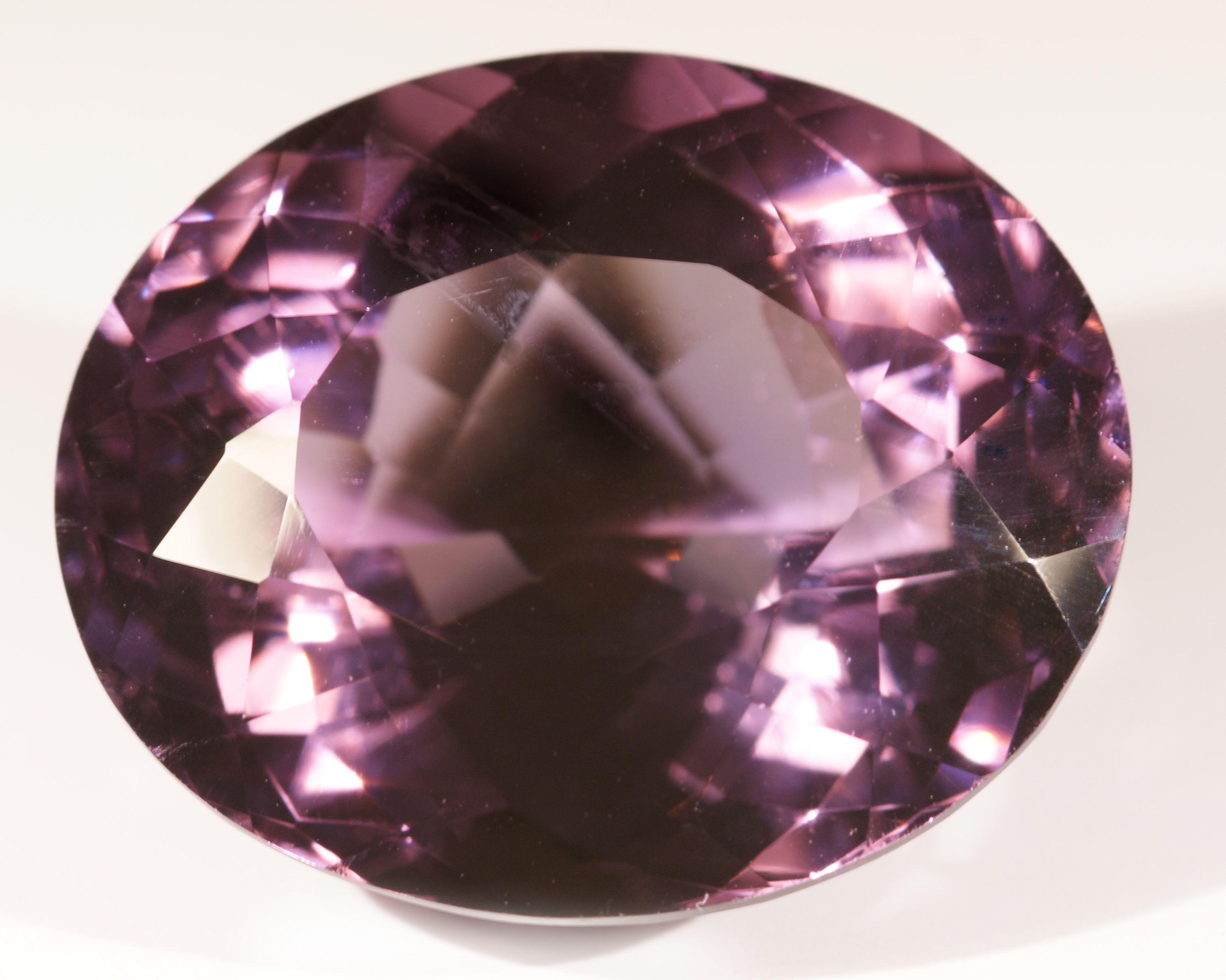
A faceted amethyst

Facets (/ˈfæsɪt/) are flat faces on geometric shapes. The organization of naturally occurring facets was key to early developments in crystallography, since they reflect the underlying symmetry of the crystal structure. Gemstones commonly have facets cut into them in order to improve their appearance by allowing them to reflect light. The earliest diamond cutting techniques were simply to polish the natural shape of rough diamonds, often octahedral crystals. It wasn't until the 14th century that faceting, the process of cutting and polishing a gemstone to create multiple flat surfaces or facets, was first developed in Europe.

== Facet arrangements ==
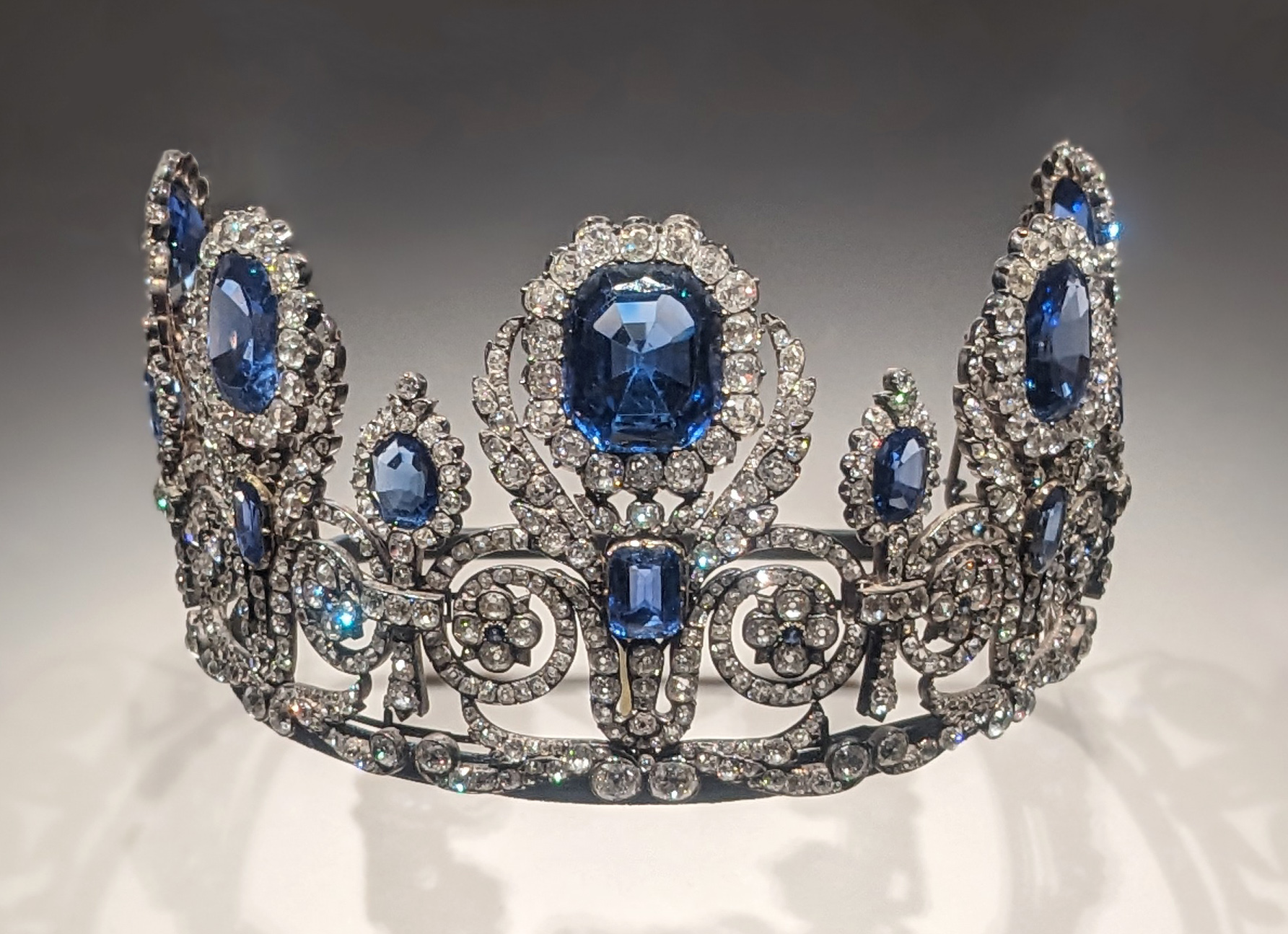
A 19th century tiara with blue sapphires and diamonds, cut in old European style.

Of the hundreds of facet arrangements that have been used, the most famous is probably the round brilliant cut, used for diamond and many colored gemstones. This first early version of what would become the modern Brilliant Cut is said to have been devised by an Italian named Peruzzi, sometime in the late 17th century. Later on, the first angles for an "ideal" cut diamond were calculated by Marcel Tolkowsky in 1919. Slight modifications have been made since then, but angles for "ideal" cut diamonds are still similar to Tolkowsky's formula. Round brilliants cut before the advent of "ideal" angles are often referred to as "Early round brilliant cut" or "Old European brilliant cut" and are considered poorly cut by today's standards, though there is still interest in them from collectors. Other historic diamond cuts include the "Old Mine Cut" which is similar to early versions of the round brilliant, but has a rectangular outline, and the "Rose Cut" which is a simple cut consisting of a flat, polished back, and varying numbers of angled facets on the crown, producing a faceted dome. Sometimes a 58th facet, called a culet is cut on the bottom of the stone to help prevent chipping of the pavilion point. Earlier brilliant cuts often have very large culets, while modern brilliant cut diamonds generally lack the culet facet, or it may be present in minute size.

== Cutting facets ==
Cutting and polishing diamonds in the Netherlands, 1946.

The art of cutting a gem is an exacting procedure performed on a faceting machine. The ideal product of facet cutting is a gemstone that displays a pleasing balance of internal reflections of light known as brilliance, strong and colorful dispersion which is commonly referred to as "fire", and brightly colored flashes of reflected light known as scintillation. Typically transparent to translucent stones are faceted, although opaque materials may occasionally be faceted as the luster of the gem will produce appealing reflections. Pleonaste (black spinel) and black diamond are examples of opaque faceted gemstones.

=== Facet angles ===
The angles used for each facet play a crucial role in the outcome of a gem. While the general facet arrangement of a particular gemstone cut may appear the same in any given gem material, the angles of each facet must be carefully adjusted to maximize the optical performance. The angles used will vary based on the refractive index of the gem material. When light passes through a gemstone and strikes a polished facet, the minimum angle possible for the facet to reflect the light back into the gemstone is called the critical angle. If the ray of light strikes a surface lower than this angle, it will leave the gem material instead of reflecting through the gem as brilliance. These lost light rays are sometimes referred to as "light leakage", and the effect caused by it is called "windowing" as the area will appear transparent and without brilliance. This is especially common in poorly cut commercial gemstones. Gemstones with higher refractive indexes generally make more desirable gemstones, the critical angle decreases as refractive indices increase, allowing for greater internal reflections as the light is less likely to escape.

=== The faceting machine ===
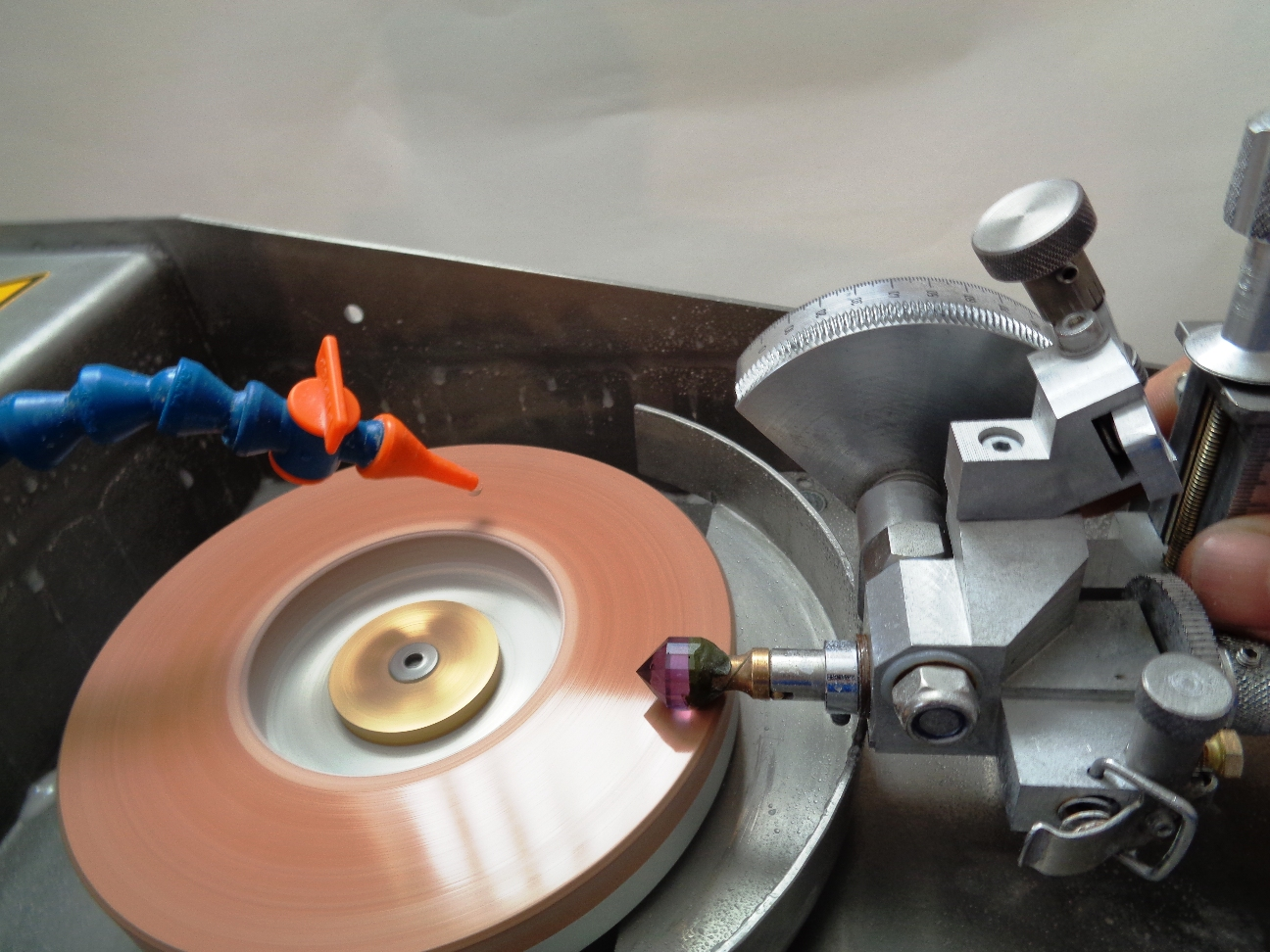
An amethyst on a dop stick in a faceting machine

This machine uses a motor-driven plate to hold a precisely flat disk (known as a "lap") for the purpose of cutting or polishing. Diamond abrasives bonded to metal or resin are typically used for cutting laps, and a wide variety of materials are used for polishing laps in conjunction with either very fine diamond powder or oxide-based polishes. Water is typically used for cutting, while either oil or water is used for the polishing process.

The machine uses a system generally called a "mast" which consists of an angle readout, height adjustment and typically a gear (called an "index gear") with a particular number of teeth is used as a means of setting the rotational angle. The angles of rotation are evenly divided by the number of teeth present on the gear, though many machines include additional means of adjusting the rotational angle in finer increments, often called a "cheater". The stone is bonded to a (typically metal) rod known as a "dop" or "dop stick" and is held in place by part of the mast referred to as the "quill".

=== The modern faceting process ===
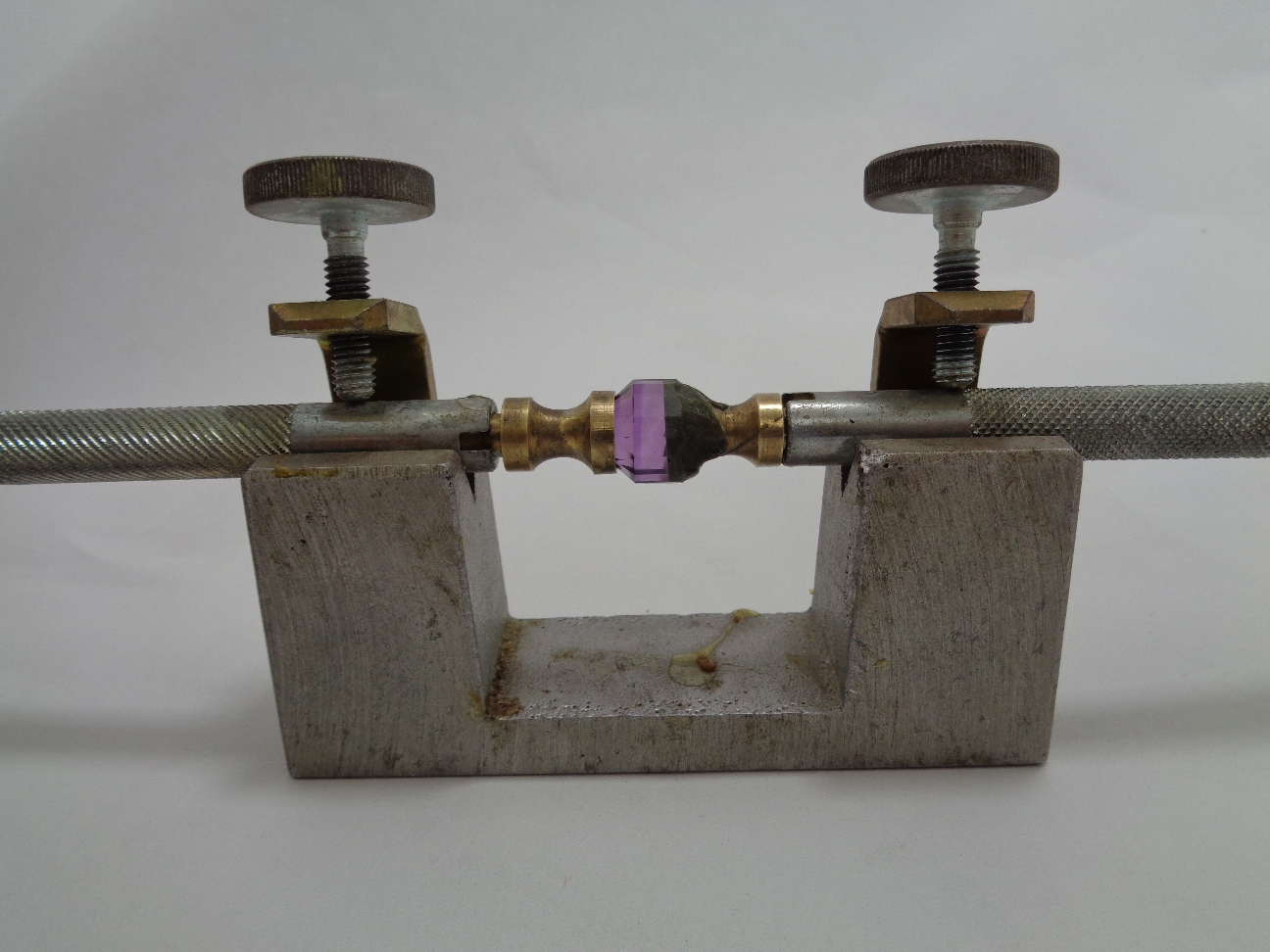
Moving an amethyst from one dop stick to another using a transfer jig.

The dopped stone is ground at precise angles and indexes on cutting laps of progressively finer grit, and then the process is repeated a final time to polish each facet. Accurate repetition of angles in the cutting and polishing process is aided by the angle readout and index gear. The physical process of polishing is a subject of debate. One commonly accepted theory is that the fine abrasive particles of a polishing compound produce abrasions smaller than the wavelengths of light, thus making the minute scratches invisible. Since gemstones have two sides (the crown and pavilion), a device often called a "transfer jig" is used to flip the stone so that each side may be cut and polished.

=== Other methods ===
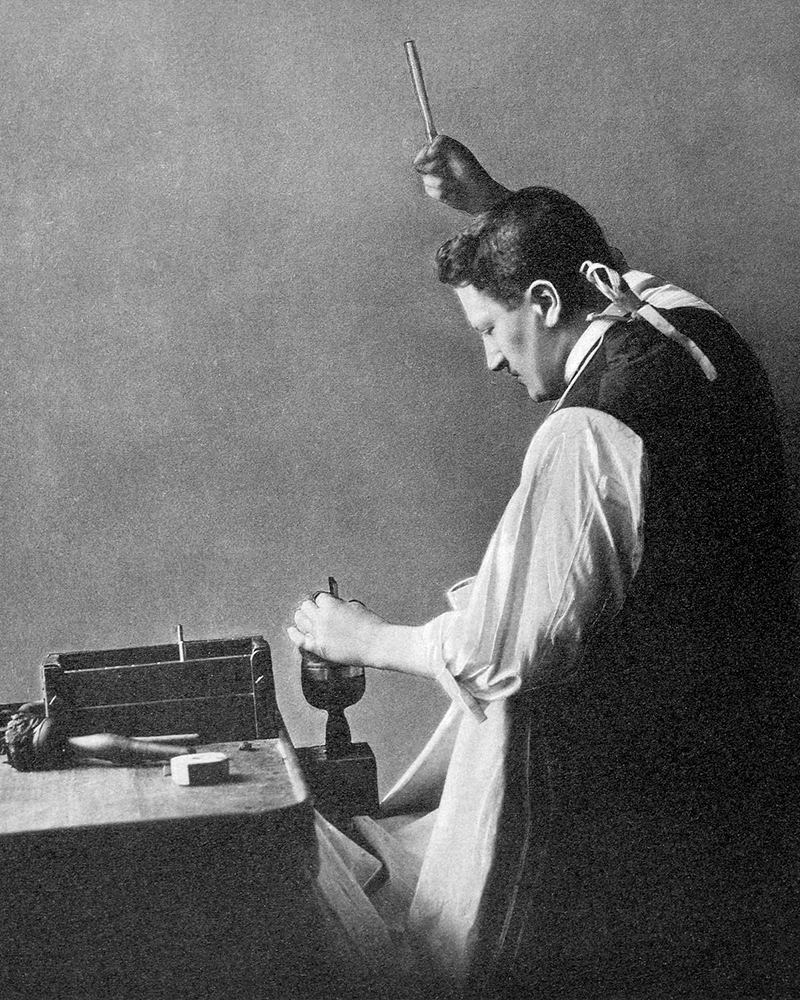
Joseph Asscher cleaving the Cullinan diamond using a steel wedge-like blade and a small club.

Cleaving relies on planar weaknesses of the chemical bonds in the crystal structure of a mineral. If a sharp blow is applied at the correct angle, the stone may split cleanly apart. While cleaving is sometimes used to split uncut gemstones into smaller pieces, it is never used to produce facets. Cleaving of diamonds was once common, but as the risk of damaging a stone is too high, undesirable diamond pieces often resulted. The preferred method of splitting diamonds into smaller pieces is now sawing.

An older and more primitive style of faceting machine called a jamb peg machine used wooden dop sticks of precise length and a "mast" system consisting of a plate with holes carefully placed in it. By placing the back end of the dop into one of the many holes, the stone could be introduced to the lap at precise angles. These machines took considerable skill to operate effectively.

Another method of facet cutting involves the use of cylinders to produce curved, concave facets. This technique can produce many unusual and artistic variations of the traditional faceting process.

== Natural faceting ==
Many crystals naturally grow in faceted shapes. For instance, common table salt forms cubes and quartz forms hexagonal prisms. These characteristic shapes are a consequence of the crystal structure of the material and the surface energy, as well as the general conditions under which the crystal formed.

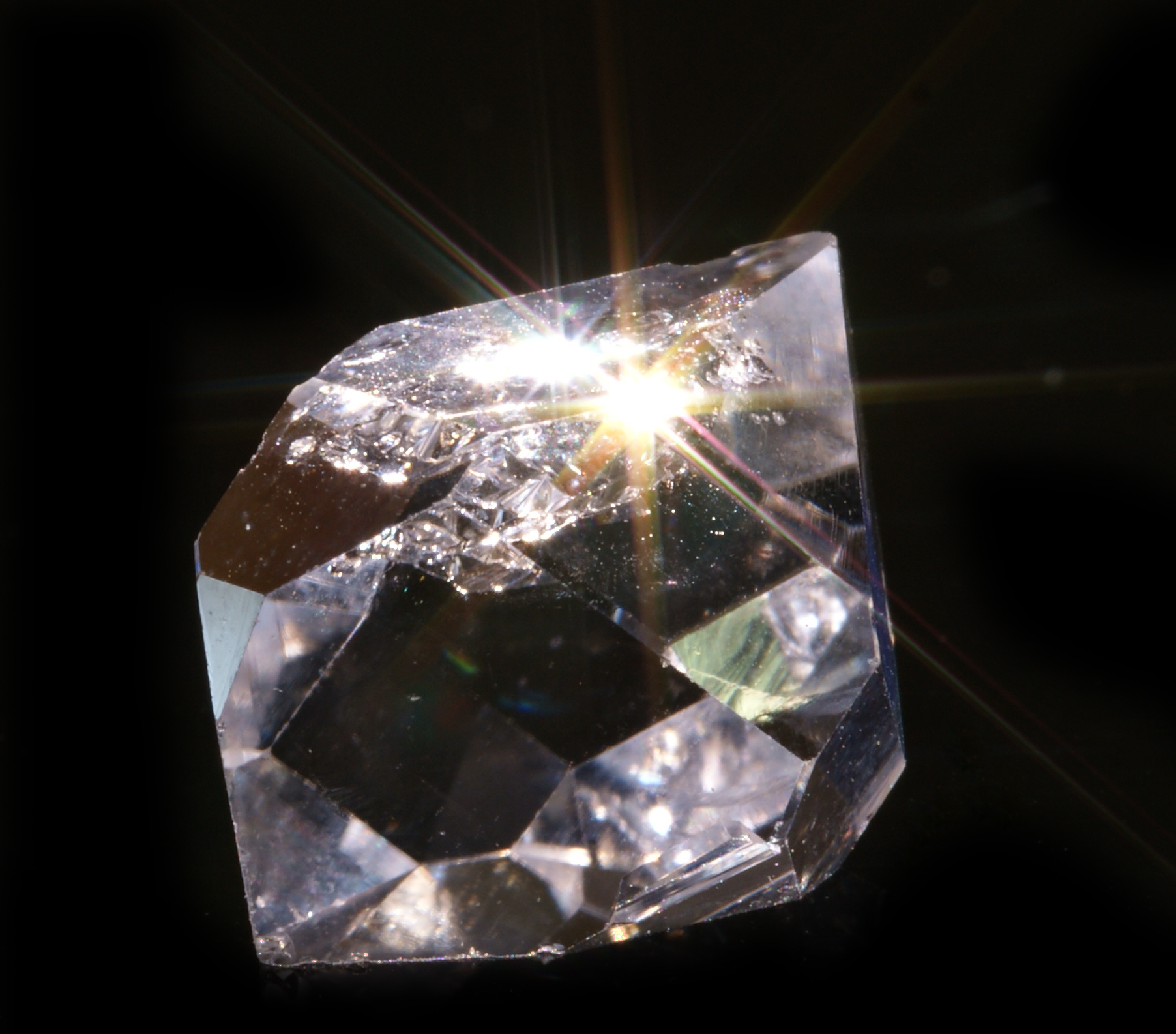
A variety of quartz, known as Herkimer diamonds due to their well-formed natural facets and clear quality.

The Bravais lattice of the crystal structure defines a set of possible "low-energy planes", which are usually planes on which the atoms are close-packed. For instance, a cubic crystal may have low-energy planes on the faces of the cube or on the diagonals. The planes are low-energy in the sense that if the crystal is cleaved along these planes, there will be relatively few broken bonds and a relatively small increase in energy over the unbroken crystal. Equivalently, these planes have a low surface energy. The planes with the lowest energy will form the largest facets, in order to minimize the overall thermodynamic free energy of the crystal. If the surface energy as a function of the planes is known, the equilibrium shape of the crystal may be found via the Wulff construction.

Growth conditions, including the surface the crystal is growing on top of (the substrate), may change the expected shape of the crystal; for instance, if the base of the crystal is under stress from the substrate, this may favor the crystal growing taller rather than growing outwards along the substrate. The surface energy, including the relative energies of the different planes, depend on many factors including the temperature, the composition of the surroundings (e.g. humidity), and the pressure.

== See also ==
- Diamond cut
- Princess cut
