= Diamond cutting =

Faceting of a rough diamond to increase its brilliance

Diamond cutting is the practice of shaping a diamond from a rough stone into a faceted gem. Cutting diamonds requires specialized knowledge, tools, equipment, and techniques because of its extreme difficulty.

The first guild of diamond cutters and polishers (Diamantaire) was formed in 1375 in Nuremberg, Germany, and led to the development of various types of "cut". This has two meanings in relation to diamonds. The first is the shape: square, oval, and so on. The second relates to the specific quality of cut within the shape, and the quality and price will vary greatly based on the cut quality. Since diamonds are one of the hardest materials, special diamond-coated surfaces are used to grind the diamond down. The first major development in diamond cutting came with the "Point Cut" during the later half of the 14th century: the Point Cut follows the natural shape of an octahedral rough diamond crystal, eliminating some waste in the cutting process.

Diamond cutting, as well as overall processing, is concentrated in a few cities around the world. The main diamond trading centers are Antwerp, Tel Aviv, and Dubai from where roughs are sent to the main processing centers of India and China. Diamonds are cut and polished in Surat, India and the Chinese cities of Guangzhou and Shenzhen. India in recent years has held around 90% of the world market in polished diamonds and China has held the rest of the world market share in a recent year. Other important diamond centers are New York City and Amsterdam.

== Diamond cutting process ==
The basic diamond cutting process includes these steps; planning, cleaving or sawing, bruting, polishing, and final inspection. A simplified round brilliant cut process includes the following stages:

- Planning – Modern day planning of a diamond is done using computer software.
- Marking – Outlining the best possible shape and cut of the diamond.
- Sawing the rough stone – depending on the shape of rough diamond as not all diamonds are sawn.
- Table
- Bruting the girdle.
- Blocking 8 main pavilion facets – these facets are divided into 4 corners and 4 pavilions as the corners and pavilions run in different directions due to the atomic structure of the diamond.
- Crown – the crown consist of 8 main facets and are divided into 4 corners and 4 bezels.
- Final bruting – ensuring the diamonds girdle is perfectly round and smooth.
- Polishing all 16 main facets.
- Brillianteering – Adding and polishing 8 stars and 16 pavilion and 16 crown halves.
- Quality control – checking for symmetry, polish and cut (angles) after the diamond is completed.

This is just one, although a fairly common way of creating a round brilliant cut. The actual process also includes many more stages depending on the size and quality of the rough stone. For example, bigger stones are first scanned to get the three-dimensional shape, which is then used to find the optimal usage. The scanning may be repeated after each stage and bruting may be done in several steps, each bringing the girdle closer to the final shape.

Cutting is possible only because the hardness of diamond varies widely according to the direction in which one is trying to cut or grind.

=== Planning ===
Diamond manufacturers analyze diamond rough from an economic perspective, with two objectives steering decisions made about how a faceted diamond will be cut. The first objective is that of maximum return on investment for the piece of diamond rough. The second is how quickly the finished diamond can be sold. Scanning devices are used to get a 3-dimensional computer model of the rough stone. Also, inclusions are photographed and placed on the 3D model, which is then used to find an optimal way to cut the stone.

==== Maximizing value ====
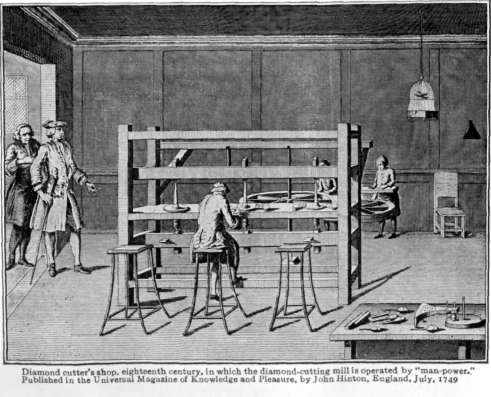
Man-powered diamond cutting mill in 18th century

The process of maximizing the value of finished diamonds, from a rough diamond into a polished gemstone, is both an art and a science. The choice of cut is influenced by many factors. Market factors include the exponential increase in value of diamonds as weight increases, referred to as weight retention, and the popularity of certain shapes amongst consumers. Physical factors include the original shape of the rough stone, and location of the inclusions and flaws to be eliminated.

===== Weight retention =====
The weight retention analysis studies the diamond rough to find the best combination of finished stones as it relates to per carat value. For instance, a 2.20-carat (440 mg) octahedron may produce (i) either two half-carat (100 mg) diamonds whose combined value may be higher than that of (ii) a 0.80-carat (160 mg) diamond plus a 0.30-carat (60 mg) diamond that could be cut from the same rough diamond.

The round brilliant cut and square brilliant cuts are preferred when the crystal is an octahedron, as often two stones may be cut from one such crystal. Oddly shaped crystals, such as macles are more likely to be cut in a fancy cut—that is, a cut other than the round brilliant—which the particular crystal shape lends itself to.

Even with modern techniques, the cutting and polishing of a diamond crystal always results in a dramatic loss of weight, about 50%. Sometimes the cutters compromise and accept lesser proportions and symmetry in order to avoid inclusions or to preserve the weight. Since the per-carat price of a diamond shifts around key milestones (such as 1.00 carat), many one-carat (200 mg) diamonds are the result of compromising cut quality for carat weight.

===== Color retention =====
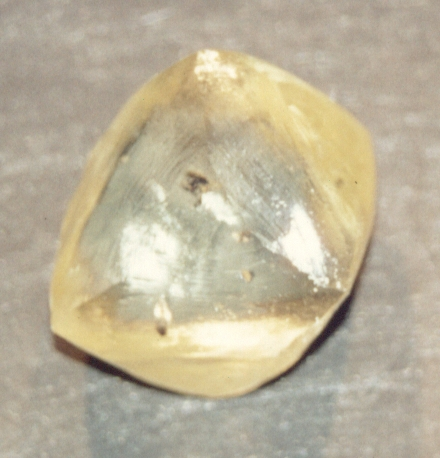
The 253-carat Oppenheimer Diamond—an uncut diamond does not show its prized optical properties

In colored diamonds, cutting can influence the color grade of the diamond, thereby raising its value. Certain cut shapes are used to intensify the color of the diamond. The radiant cut is an example of this type of cut.

Natural green color diamonds most often have merely a surface coloration caused by natural irradiation, which does not extend through the stone. For this reason green diamonds are cut with significant portions of the original rough diamond's surface (naturals) left on the finished gem. It is these naturals that provide the color to the diamond.

==== Turnaround minimization ====
The other consideration of diamond planning is how quickly a diamond will sell. This consideration is often unique to the type of manufacturer. While a certain cutting plan may yield a better value, a different plan may yield diamonds that will sell sooner, providing an earlier return on the investment.

=== Cleaving or sawing ===
Cleaving is the separation of a piece of diamond rough into separate pieces, to be finished as separate gems. During the planning stage, diamond manufacturers identify cleavage planes, and use those planes to decide how to split the diamond. Diamond manufacturers make a groove in the diamond with a laser or saw or another diamond, and then split the diamond by placing a steel blade in the groove and giving a gentle tap. Cleavage can be along any of the four planes parallel to the faces of an octahedral diamond (i.e. perpendicular to body diagonals of the unit cell).

Sawing is the use of a diamond saw or laser to cut the diamond rough into separate pieces. Unlike cleaving, this step does not involve cleavage planes. This step gives diamonds their initial shape.

=== Bruting ===
Bruting is the art of cutting a diamond to make the girdle round. In the modern era diamonds are rounded using either a laser, a diamond disk impregnated with diamonds, or spinning two diamonds so they cut against each other. Industrial diamonds can also be used for bruting a diamond round. Modern computer software measures the roundness of each diamond and ideal cut diamonds have to round within a tenth of a millimeter to qualify as an excellent cut diamond.

=== Diamond polishing ===
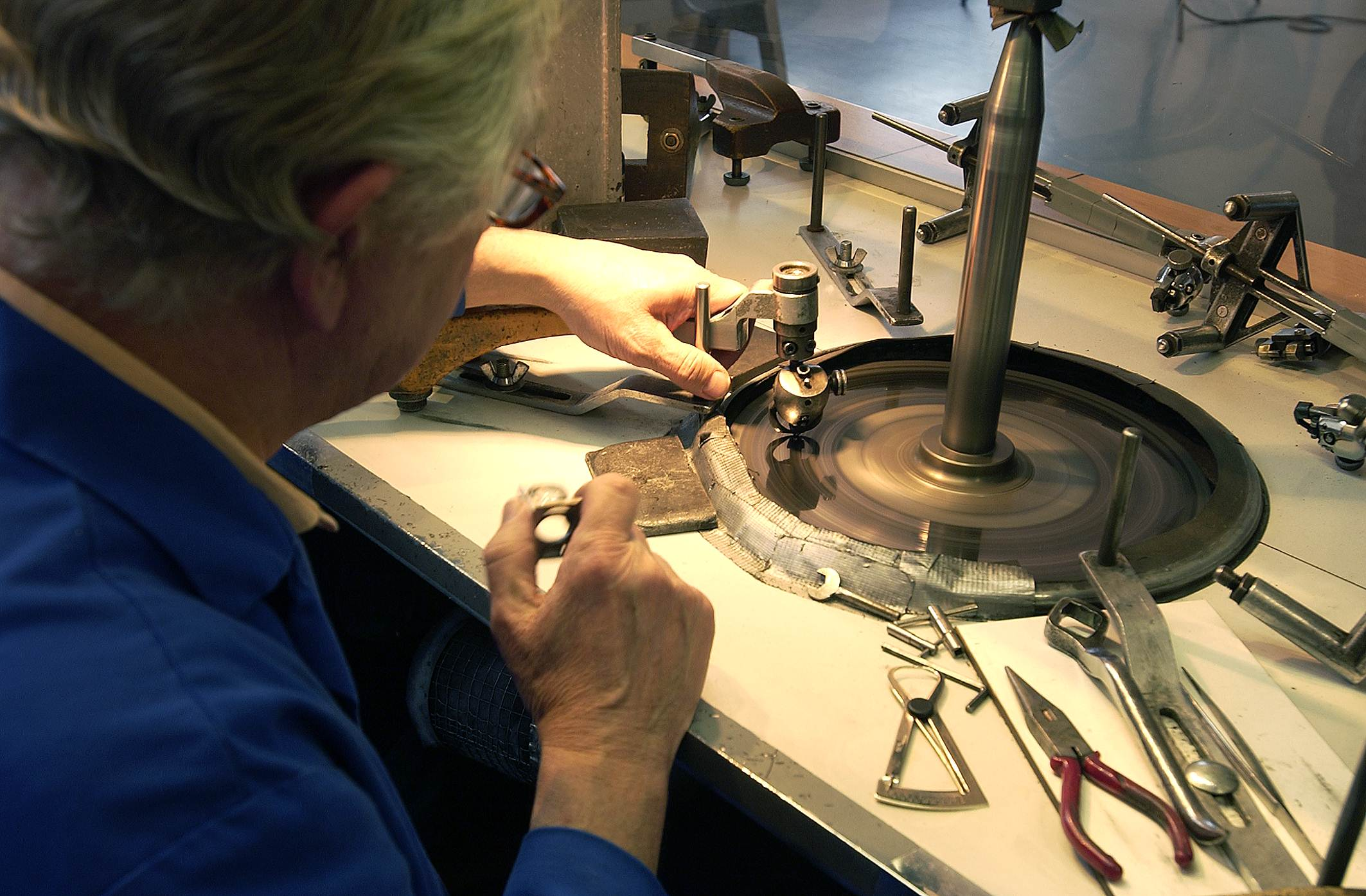
Diamond polisher in Amsterdam. Polishing is carried out by forcing a diamond against a spinning disk with abrasive.

Diamond polishing is the final polishing of the diamond. In a diamond factory, one would find a diamond crossworker who first places the main facets on a diamond (blocking the diamond). This is done to ensure maximum weight, clarity and best angles for the specific shape of diamond. After initial crossworking is complete, the diamond is finalized by smoothing the main facets by the crossworker, which is known as polishing the diamond. After the main facets have been polished by the crossworker, the final facets are polished onto the diamond by a brillianteer. The facets added are the stars, top and bottom halves are also known as upper and lower girdle facets.

=== Final inspection ===
The final stage involves thoroughly cleaning the diamond in acids, and examining the diamond to see whether it meets the quality standards of the manufacturer.

== Recutting ==
Due to changes in market desirability and popularity, the value of different styles of diamond fluctuates. All diamonds can be recut into new shapes that will increase value at that time in the market and desirability. An example of this is the marquise cut diamond which was popular in the 1970s to 1980s. In later decades, jewelers had little success in selling this shape in comparison to other shapes like the oval or pear shape. The marquise can be cut into an oval diamond by any diamond cutter with a loss of 5 to 10% in total weight. For example, a 1.10-carat marquise shape would be a 1.00 oval cut diamond by rounding the sharp points and creating an oval which currently in the market has a much greater desirability and resale value. The same marquise shape also could become a pear shape instead by only trimming and rounding the side which will be turned into the base of the pear shape.

In the 18th century there was a trend for recutting Indian diamonds to suit English tastes. The Koh-i-Noor's original cut weighed a little over 186.00 carats. When it was recut to an oval-shaped brilliant, almost 80 carats were lost.

Other aspects are affected in recutting for value as well, such as the clarity. If an original shape contained inclusions on the tips, the recut would yield an increase in clarity since trimming down to a new shape would yield a cleaner overall finished diamond.

== See also ==
- Cut (gems)
- Diamond
  - List of diamonds
- Diamond cut
  - Brilliant (diamond cut)
  - Pendeloque cut
  - Princess cut
  - Trilliant cut
- Faceting machine
- Gemcutter
- American Gem Society
- Black Falcon - world largest cut diamond
