= Faceting machine =

A faceting machine is broadly defined as any device that allows the user to place and polish facets onto a mineral specimen. Machines can range in sophistication from primitive jamb-peg machines to highly refined, and highly expensive, commercially available machines. A major division among machines is found between those that facet diamonds and those that do not. Specialized equipment is required for diamond faceting, and faceting as an occupation rarely bridges the gap between diamond and non-diamond workmanship. A second division can be made between industrial faceting and custom/hobby faceting. The vast majority of jewelry-store gemstones are faceted either abroad in factories or entirely by machines. (Diamonds are the exception, owing to the training and specialized equipment required to facet them.) Custom jewelry is still commonly made of custom metalwork and mass-produced gemstones, but unusual cuts or particularly valuable gemstone material will likely be faceted on a personal faceting machine.

== Home and custom faceting machines ==
A number of manufacturers sell non-commercial faceting machines. Among the more common names are Ultra-Tec, Facetron, Graves and Poly-Metric, although there are many competing brands. They range in price from just over $1,800 to upwards of $5,500 (not including the additional equipment/supplies needed).

The essentials of how a faceting machine works will be explored through this type of machine. There are two major components of a faceting machine: The mast/head assembly, and the grinding wheel, or lap. A rough piece of mineral is attached to the head, and through angle, rotation, and height adjustments of the head, the mineral is lowered into contact with the grinding wheel until a facet has been ground.

== Major components ==
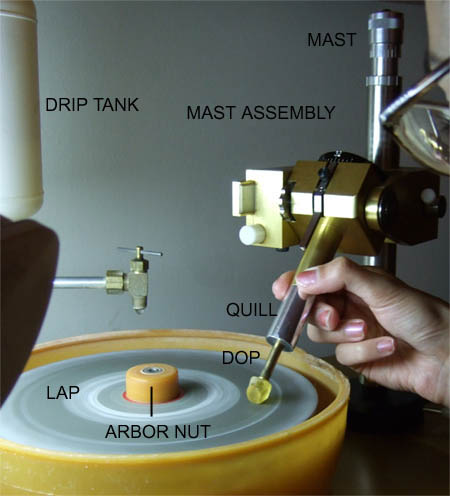
The components of a faceting machine

The mast assembly is the heart of the faceting machine. The rest of the machine is simple in construction, including the arbor for the grinding wheel, the motor that runs the arbor, a drip tank, and the controlling switches. These are described below:

Lap: The lap is a flat, hard disc used to cut and polish gems. Laps can be made of various materials such as metal, wood, plastic. Laps can be embedded with diamond grit to help with cutting and grinding.

Arbor: Similar to the prong in the middle of a record player, onto which the record is placed. The lap, or grinding wheel, is placed onto it rather than a record, and the arbor is machined to run perfectly flat when turning.

Arbor Nut: The screw that fits through the top of the lap and secures it to the arbor.

Motor: Typically the motor is housed beneath the machine and is attached by one of several means to the arbor. Motors are always velocity-variable and some can be reversed, i.e. clockwise as well as counterclockwise.

Drip Tank: The drip tank serves two purposes. 1) The friction produced from contact between the rough and the lap creates heat, which can damage the lap and create stress fractures in the stone. The drip tank allows the user to choose a drip rate via spigot and to position the spigot over the lap, nearer or farther from the arbor. 2) The dust produced from grinding minerals can cause pulmonary disease if inhaled. The flow of water captures the particles in a slurry, which drains into a rubber container around and below the lap. This container has an exit tube that drains into a second receptacle.

Controls: The controls are generally simple and control the rotational velocity of the lap—the key control—and sometimes the direction of spin, i.e. clockwise or counterclockwise.

== Mast assembly ==
As stated above, the mast assembly is what makes a faceting machine a faceting machine. Its components are as follows:

Mast: A vertical pole mounted into the base of the machine on which the assembly is positioned. The pole must be machined with extreme care to ensure its perpendicularity to the lap. This is so that, when the angles for facets are chosen, they are placed at the correct angle. Facets at incorrect angles can mean a gemstone that is lifeless or transparent rather than sparkly.

Dop: The piece of rough gemstone is glued or attached with hot wax to the end of a brass or steel rod, known as a dop or dop stick. The other end of the dop is placed into the quill of the faceting head. The exposed piece of rough usually becomes the bottom of the stone, known as the pavilion. Once the pavilion is faceted and polished, a jig is used to attach the pavilion to another dop, and the rough side of the stone is freed from its dop. This rough side will now become the top of the stone, or the crown.

Quill: The dop is inserted into the quill, which is lowered toward the lap to place a facet. The quill is the part of the machine that is held in the hand during faceting. The other end of the quill is attached to the main head of the assembly.

Index Wheel: If you view a gemstone from the top, you will see it has some type of symmetry. Most round brilliant diamonds will have eightfold symmetry; emerald cuts have two or fourfold. In order to cut facets around a stone, the quill must be rotated around its long axis. The index wheel is what allows this to be done in a repeatable, accurate manner. For example, the index wheel may have 64 teeth. If a round stone with eightfold symmetry is being cut, the index will be set at 0, 8, 16, 24, 32, 40, 48 and 56 for each of the main facets around the stone. If a square stone is being cut, only 0, 16, 32 and 48 would be used.

Angle Adjustment/Goniometer: Faceting machines differ greatly in the mechanism for setting the angle of the facet. Essentially, the angle is set and the quill will then lower to exactly that angle before physically being stopped or otherwise indicating arrival at the desired angle.

Height Adjustment: The depth of a facet is determined by how high or low the head assembly is relative to the lap. The way this is determined is by choosing an angle, lowering the quill, with dop inserted, to that angle, and then observing whether and how deeply the piece of rough is contacting the lap. Generally the first adjustment will set the rough just touching the lap, so that a very shallow facet will be placed. The head can then be lowered by a micro-adjustment and the facet can be cut and re-cut until it is of a desired depth. Many machines allow the head to be untightened from the mast and slid up and down for gross adjustments, and then have a separate mechanism for making fine adjustments up and down.

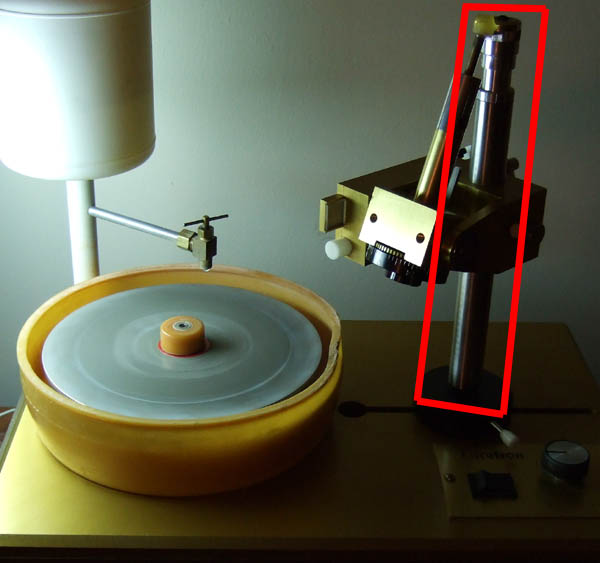
Location of the mast on a faceting machine

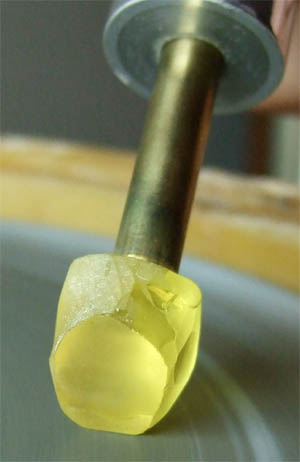
A rough quartz gemstone attached to the dop

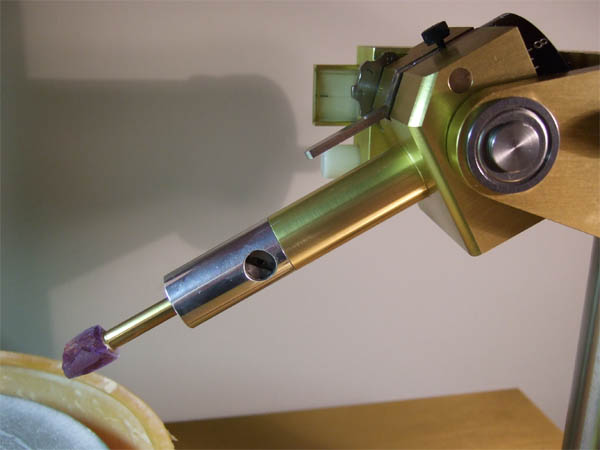
The quill of a faceting machine

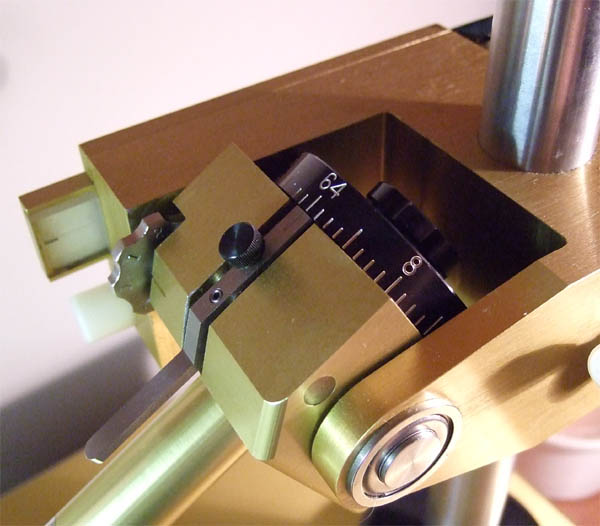
The index wheel of a faceting machine

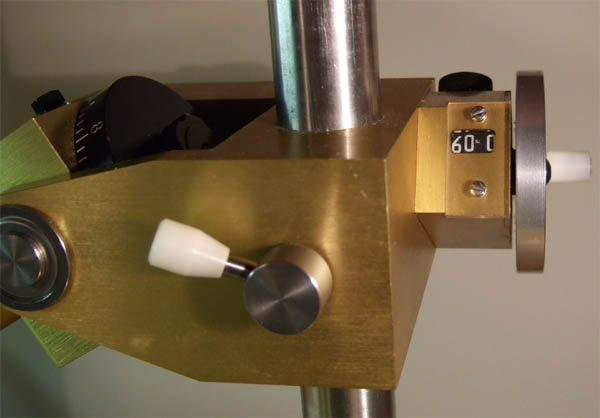
The angle adjustment component of a faceting machine

== Overall procedure ==
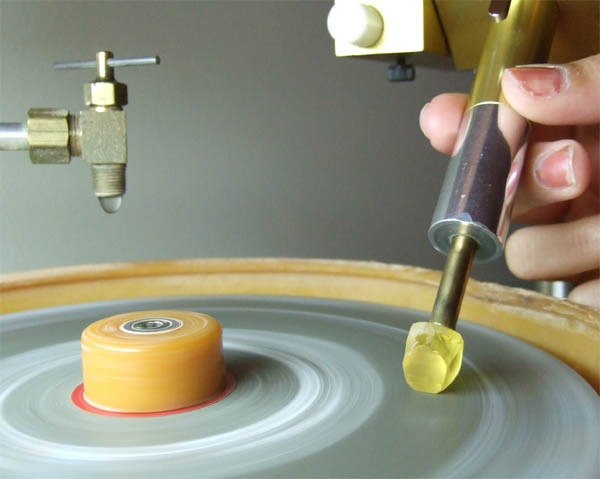
A quartz gemstone being faceted

First the rough stone is glued to the end of the dop. Once the glue or wax has set, the other end of the dop is inserted into the quill. The index is set to 64, which is the same as 0. The mineral in this example is quartz, so the first angle will be 45 degrees. This is set, and the quill is lowered to make sure it will stop at roughly 45 degrees.

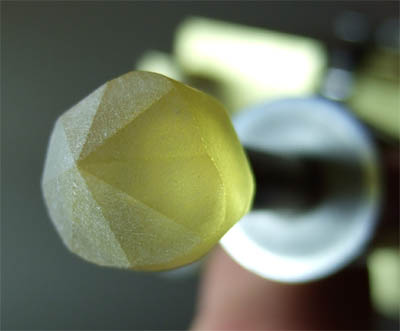
A partially faceted quartz gemstone

The head is then grossly adjusted for height so that the rough is just touching the lap when it is lowered into position. The machine is turned on so the lap begins to spin. The drip tank spigot is opened and adjusted so that about one drip falls per second onto the lap, and the drip is made to fall near the center of the lap so the water will be carried outward by centrifugal force and cover the whole lap. The quill is carefully lowered to the lap and contact is made. This is a grinding lap, so it is very coarse, and the sound is something like a running faucet. Gentle pressure is applied and the mineral is ground away until the quill reaches the desired angle. The quill is lifted and the facet is inspected.

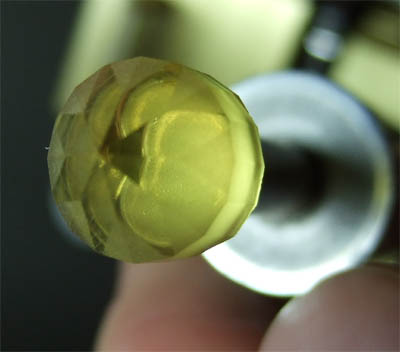
The polished facets of a quartz

If it is of adequate depth, which generally means the inner side of the facet has reached the midline of the stone, the index is turned to number 8. The quill is again lowered and a second facet is ground to 45 degrees. The height of the mast no longer needs to be set, because it is standard to have every facet be the same depth when faceting a round stone. Six more facets are placed as the index is turned, resulting in an eight-sided pyramidal shape.

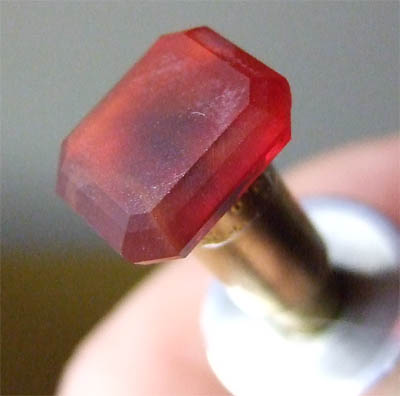
A rectangular stone later in the faceting process

If this were a rectangular stone, two facets would be ground at 0 and 32 on the index, and then the head would be raised or lowered and two facets would be placed at a shallower or deeper level at 16 and 48.

The basic shape of the pavilion has now been created. More facets at different angles can be placed. Once the basic shape is established, a series of different laps can be used that are of increasingly fine grit. Once the facets are prepolished, a final polish can be performed with a gritless lap treated with polishing compound.

== Diamond faceting ==
Diamond is the hardest known substance on earth, so finding a material that can be used to cut it presents a problem. Luckily, diamond's hardness is slightly different along different crystal axes. The particles of diamond on the grinding wheel are randomly oriented, so some of them will be aligned with the harder axes toward the rough diamond to be cut. The rough, therefore, needs to be extensively studied so it can be positioned for optimal cutting on the machine. The machines must be more durable and have different features than cutting machines for other gemstones. The process is far more involved and, of course, more expensive, so diamond cutting hobbyists are far rarer than cutters of other gemstones. A gemcutter who can cut professional-quality diamonds is called a diamantaire.
