= Diamond Princess =

Diamond Princess can refer to:

- Diamond Princess (album), by American rapper Trina
- Diamond Princess (ship), a cruise ship operated by Princess Cruises
- Princess cut diamond, a popular style of cutting a diamond for jewellery
- Diamond Princess, a 2007 album by Miliyah Kato
