= Brilliant (gemstone cut) =

Gemstone cut with many facets to increase the brilliance

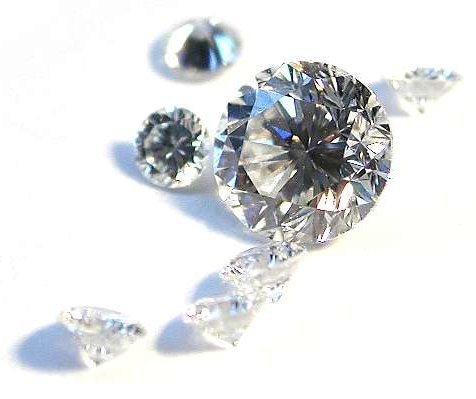
A scattering of "brilliant" cut diamonds shows off the many reflecting facets.

A brilliant is a diamond or other gemstone cut in a particular style with 57-58 facets so as to have exceptional brilliance. The word 'brilliant' is often used for diamonds cut in this style that are round in shape, also known as 'round brilliant cut' or 'standard brilliant cut.' The underside is conical, a shape that provides maximal light return through the top of the diamond. Even with modern techniques, the cutting and polishing of a diamond crystal always results in a dramatic loss of weight; rarely is this loss less than 50%. The round brilliant cut is preferred when the crystal is an octahedron, as often two stones may be cut from one such crystal. Oddly-shaped crystals such as macles are more likely to be cut in a fancy cut—that is, a cut other than the round brilliant—which the particular crystal shape lends itself to.

== Origin and etymology ==
Gold ring with Old European cut diamonds, late 1800s, Hallwyl Museum

The earliest diamond cutting techniques were simply to polish the natural shape of rough diamonds, often octahedral crystals. Around the 1500s, polishing and cutting inventions made it possible to shape diamonds better, cut facets, and make the stones sparkle more. The 17th century brought the development of the 'brilliant' cutting style, characterized by triangular and kite-shaped facets on both the crown and pavilion. By 1750, a round cut called Old European cut was developed using a technique called bruting to round the girdle of a diamond. It was improved into the Circular (or Transitional) brilliant around the 1880s with the invention of the bruting machine, followed by modifications to the design's proportions in the 1910s that have become standardized into the modern round brilliant cut design.

As brilliant cut diamonds became more popular, the term 'brilliant' transitioned from being just the name of a style to cut a gemstone, to be used as a common name or abbreviation for 'round brilliant cut diamonds'.

== Facet proportions and names ==
Diamond proportions and facets, for the round brilliant cut.

The modern round brilliant-cut was developed by Marcel Tolkowsky in 1919. The ideal proportions are 100% diameter, 53% table, 43.1% pavilion and 16.2% crown. The girdle and culet (if any—not part of Tolkowsky's original design) are cut from the ideal brilliant. The modern round brilliant consists of 58 facets (or 57 if the culet is excluded), ordinarily today cut in two pyramids placed base to base: 33 on the crown (the top half above the middle or girdle of the stone), truncated comparatively near its base by the table, and 25 on the pavilion (the lower half below the girdle), which has only the apex cut off to form the culet, around which 8 extra facets are sometimes added. Over time it has become usual for most girdles to be faceted. Many girdles have 32, 64, 80, or 96 facets; these facets are not counted in the total. While the facet count is standard, the actual proportions (crown height and angle, pavilion depth, etc.) are not standardised. Some gem cutters refer to an American brilliant cut or a Scandinavian brilliant cut. According to Green et al. 2001:

Because every facet has the potential to change a light ray's plane of travel, every facet must be considered in any complete calculation of light paths. Just as a two-dimensional slice of a diamond provides incomplete information about the three-dimensional nature of light behavior inside a diamond, this two-dimensional slice also provides incomplete information about light behavior outside the diamond. A diamond's panorama is three-dimensional. Although diamonds are highly symmetrical, light can enter a diamond from many directions and many angles. This factor further highlights the need to reevaluate Tolkowsky's results, and to recalculate the effects of a diamond's proportions on its appearance aspects.

...

Another important point to consider is that Tolkowsky did not follow the path of a ray that was reflected more than twice in the diamond. However, we (Green et al.) now know that a diamond's appearance is composed of many light paths that reflect considerably more than two times within that diamond. Once again, we can see that Tolkowsky's predictions are helpful in explaining optimal diamond performance, but they are incomplete by today's [2001] technological standards.

Figures 1 and 2 show the facets of a round brilliant diamond.

Figure 1 assumes that the "thick part of the girdle" is the same thickness at all 16 "thick parts". It does not consider the effects of indexed upper girdle facets.

Figure 2 is adapted from Figure 37 of Marcel Tolkowsky's Diamond Design, which was originally published in 1919. Since 1919, the lower girdle facets have become longer. As a result, the pavilion main facets have become narrower.

== Cut grading ==
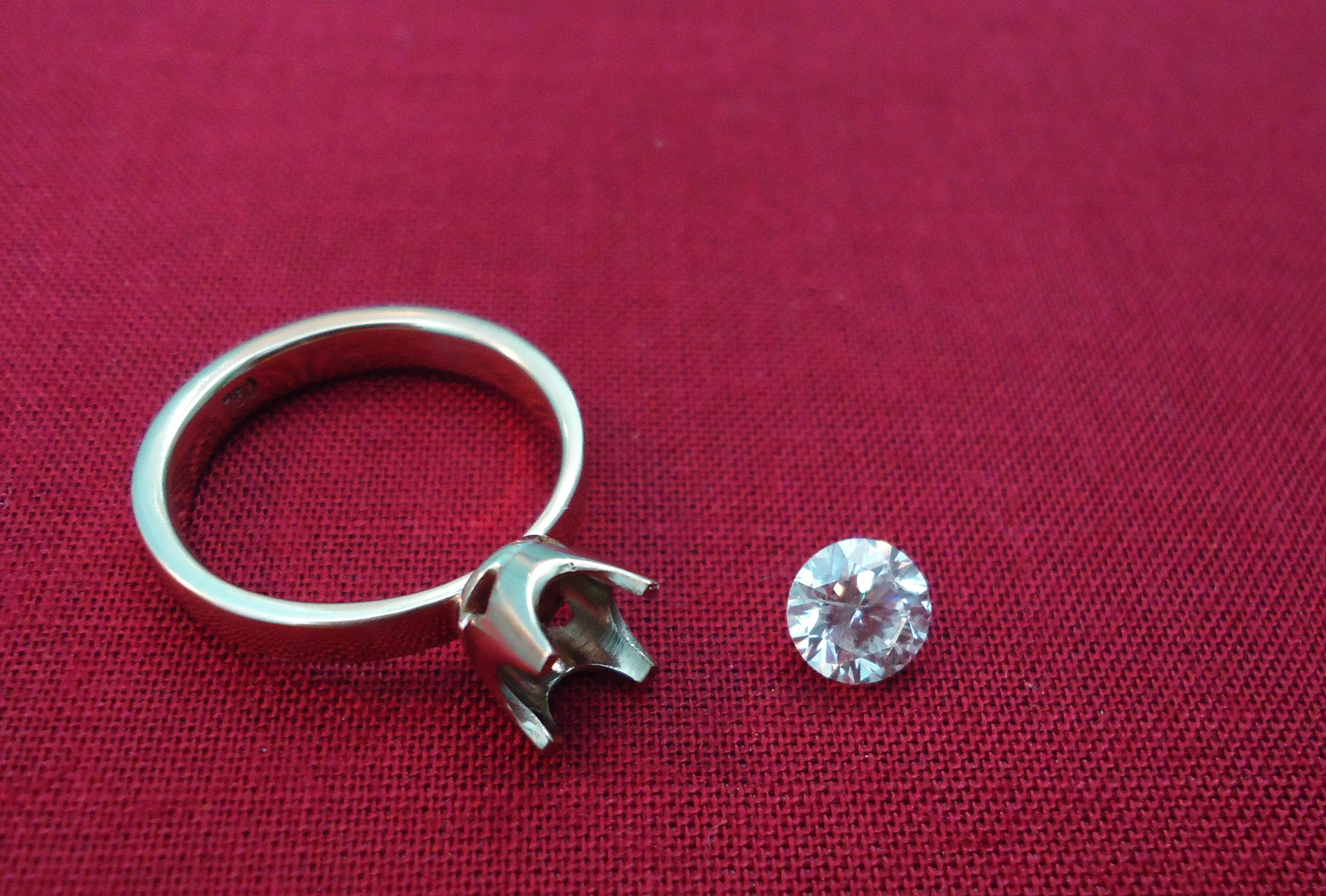
Solitary ring and diamond before mounting

The relationship between the crown angle and the pavilion angle has the greatest effect on the look of the diamond. A slightly steep pavilion angle can sometimes be complemented by a shallower crown angle and vice versa.

Other proportions also affect the look of the diamond:

- The table ratio is highly significant.
- The length of the lower girdle facets affects whether Hearts and arrows can be seen in the stone, under certain viewers.
  - Most round brilliant diamonds have roughly the same girdle thickness at all 16 "thick parts".
  - So-called "cheated" girdles have thicker girdles where the main facets touch the girdle than where adjacent upper girdle facets touch the girdle. These stones weigh more for a given diameter, average girdle thickness, crown angle, pavilion angle, and table ratio, and have worse optical performance, i.e., their upper girdle facets appear dark in some lighting conditions.
  - So-called "painted" girdles have thinner girdles where the main facets touch the girdle than where adjacent upper girdle facets touch the it. These stones (such as EightStar-brand diamonds) have less light leakage at the edge of the stone (for a given crown angle, pavilion angle, and table ratio). Some diamonds with painted girdles receive lower grades in the GIA's cut grading system, for reasons given in a 2005 GIA article.

Several groups have developed diamond cut grading standards. These standards differ somewhat on which proportions make the best cut. There are certain proportions that are considered best by two or more groups, however.

- The AGA standards may be the strictest. David Atlas, who developed the AGA standards, has suggested that they are overly strict.
- The HCA (Holloway Cut Adviser) changed several times between 2001 and 2004. As of 2004, an HCA score below two represented an excellent cut. The HCA distinguishes between brilliant, Tolkowsky, and fiery cuts.
- The American Gem Society (AGS) standards changed in 2005 in order better to match Tolkowsky's model and Octonus' ray tracing results. The 2005 AGS standards penalize stones with "cheated" girdles. They grade from 0 to 10.
- The GIA began grading cut on every grading report beginning in 2006, based on their comprehensive study of 20,000 proportions with 70,000 observations of 2,000 diamonds. The single descriptive words are as follows: Excellent, Very Good, Good, Fair, and Poor.

The distance from the viewer's eye to the diamond is important. The 2005 AGS cut standards are based on a distance of 25 centimeters (about 10 inches). The 2004 HCA cut standards are based on a distance of 40 centimeters (about 16 inches).

Polish and symmetry are two important aspects of cut. The polish grade describes the smoothness of the diamond's facets and the symmetry grade refers to alignment of the facets. With poor polish, the surface of a facet can be dull and may create blurred or dull sparkle. The stone may look like it needs to be cleaned. Because of the lack of symmetry, light can be misdirected as it enters and exits the diamond.

== See also ==
- Diamond cut
- Diamond cutting
- Princess cut
- List of diamonds
