= ImaGem Inc. =

Gemstone company

ImaGem Inc. is an information company that uses automated technology for grading and identifying gems. Its parent company, ImageStatistics, provides imaging and image processing applications for the medical, pharmaceutical, manufacturing, and chemical sectors. The company was established following research into human perception and the development of ImageStatistics, a statistical tool by Lalit K. Aggarwal. The company's systems use optics and imaging software to automate diamond grading. ImaGem also analyzes Light behavior information based on precise and repeatable measures; three complementary dimensions of brilliance, intensity and sparkle. ImaGem has created a system of uniquely identifying and registering (fingerprinting) a stone without any need for laser inscription. By offering all this information, ImaGem has promoted decision-making and efficiency in the gem industry supply chain. In 1998, ImaGem Inc. was incorporated in the state of Pennsylvania, US, after funding from a major retailer, Ben Franklin Technology Partnership, and private funding. The company has developed an integrated technology to collect image data for diamonds and gemstones, analyze it using direct measurement methodology and grade for precise and repeatable measurements.

== Breakthroughs and technological advances ==
=== Color ===
Color grading of diamonds (see Diamond color) and gemstones is subjective - an individual compares a subject stone under a light source to a master stone and assigns a color grade. This approach is well-known to provide a color grade that is not repeatable because, in the past, there has been confusion among different methods of grading used in various labs. Because of this, ImaGem solved several problems which contribute to a lack of precision and repeatability in color grading.

1. The human perceptual system is not capable of precise color memory. Perception of color by an individual can vary during different times of the day, by environmental factors, and by eye color.
2. Light sources are not standardized either for their color temperature or their UV component.
3. Master Stones used in grading are generally of a particular weight at a grading lab. Different labs may use master stones of different weights.

All these factors therefore, in varying degrees, contribute to inconsistent color grading as it has been practiced in previous years.

ImaGem’s color grading system was designed based on measurements with a system error of 1/400 of 1% to achieve high levels of precision and repeatability. The system assigns grades within 1/3 of the color grading system used by major diamond grading labs. The color grading system corrects for weight and fluorescence and uses CIE Chromaticity System (see CIE 1931 color space).

=== Fluorescence ===
The most frequent color of fluorescence in diamonds is blue, but it occurs in many other colors. Fluorescence may be exhibited at both short-wave and long-wave UV. The strength of fluorescence also varies from slight to high. The value of a diamond may be affected by the presence and strength of fluorescence in a diamond. As a matter of personal taste, some people prefer a diamond with fluorescence. Although some may disagree, it is generally thought that fluorescence may influence perception of body color in a diamond and hence, its color grade.

Standard fluorescence grading is done by a trained gemologist using master stones and assigning a grade after projecting short and long-wave UV. Since a standardized lighting source has not yet been defined, and because of the subjective nature of the process, fluorescence grades in the past have not been repeatable.

Although instruments for measuring fluorescence have existed for some time, the process for measuring low-levels of fluorescence takes time and therefore may not be practical for fluorescence grading of diamonds. There are primarily three problems that need resolution to measure fluorescence accurately and repeat ably.

1. The measurement of fluorescence in diamonds must be done quickly.
2. To achieve accuracy and repeatability, it must use light sources that are highly reliable, both in terms of their spectra characteristics and emission level.
  1. ImaGem developed a proprietary system to measure fluorescence in a diamond in a fraction of a second. To achieve accuracy and repeatability, light sources are standardized and multiple readings are taken around a diamond and then averaged. This technique is used to measure fluorescence in polished as well as rough diamonds, and can also be used for other gemstones.
3. The measurement should not depend on the size of a stone.

=== Clarity ===
In diamonds and gemstones there is a need to identify that a product sold is what it is claimed to be. Also, one needs to determine if a gemstone has been treated or filled, or manufactured using composites. In rough gemstones, presence of foreign matter and inclusions affects the value of the rough material and is considered in planning how the stone will be cut to manufacture polished gemstones. Features in rough as well as finished goods are also used to fingerprint a gemstone. Finally, once polished goods are manufactured they require an assessment of their quality based on presence or absence of inclusions. Any activity related to the above, in general, deals with clarity of a gemstone.

ImaGem developed patented technology to precisely map, and measure inclusions in gemstones. There were several technical challenges ImaGem had to overcome in order to map inclusions:

1. Mapping inclusions at various levels within a gemstone.
2. Mapping inclusions in gemstones with frosted or coated surfaces.
3. Mapping inclusions in polished goods being difficult because imaging systems in general create dark areas which are difficult to process.

These problems were addressed in the system developed by ImaGem by selecting appropriate immersion fluids, lighting environment and imaging system (lens and camera).

ImaGem’s Clarity system was built to see the exact location of inclusions in rough and polished diamonds. In regards to rough stones, inclusions are seen without the need to add windows to evaluate prior to cutting. Stones are immersed, in a special fluid and then imaged to identify inclusions. Some images of rough, polished diamonds and composite ruby illustrate the use of this technology in the gem and jewelry industry. This technology has also been used in the manufacture of other products where it is important to evaluate the product for consistency and absence of foreign matter. In the gem and jewelry industry in particular, this technology is used for Kimberley Certification, valuation of an individual of a parcel of rough, identification and for clarity grading.

=== Light behavior ===
A diamond is cut to bring forth its beauty as expressed by its Light Behavior (see light performance). Until recently, it was impractical to measure light behavior in a cut and polished diamond. Gemologists relied on the proportions of a diamond as a means to cut and grade brilliant diamonds. One way that several organizations have advanced a system of grading a diamond is by grading it based on its proportions. Another development has been to use mathematical models to predict the light behavior of a diamond and grade it on the predicted behavior. The third approach is to measure light behavior in a real diamond. ImaGem’s light behavior is based on Direct Measurement of light behavior in diamonds of different shapes and sizes, which means that it grades these stones based on a new set of measurements, instead of simply comparing them to other brilliant-cut stones. It has identified 3 characteristics of light behavior that are important to describe the beauty of a diamond. These factors are brilliance, sparkle and intensity.

Brilliance represents average grey scale value of pixels comprising the top view of a diamond. This particular characteristic is generally accepted in most systems interested in light behavior of a diamond. Sparkle is measured as variation of grey scale values among pixels within the perimeter of a diamond. ImaGem uses sparkle to identify the dynamic behavior (scintillation) when a diamond or light is moved. Intensity (contrast) is a new concept introduced by ImaGem to capture the pattern of dark and bright areas in a diamond. This particular characteristic is patented and represents an attribute of a diamond that takes into account figure ground segregation essential to human perception. These three measures of light behavior in a diamond, in summary, are derived from direct measurement, are objective, repeatable, and take into account human perception of visual objects.
