= Marcel Tolkowsky =

Belgian mathematician and gemologist

Marcel Tolkowsky (25 December 1899 – 10 February 1991), an engineer by education, was a Belgian member of a Jewish family of diamond cutters from Poland. He is generally acknowledged as the father of the modern round brilliant diamond cut. Many of his family have gone on to become noted diamond cutters, including his cousin Lazare Kaplan and his great-nephew Gabi Tolkowsky.

Tolkowsky, as part of his PhD topic at the University of London, systematically studied the grinding of diamonds. Around the same time, in his book Diamond Design, he published the specifications of what would later be called the American Standard (also known as the American Ideal Cut, Tolkowsky cut, and Tolkowsky Brilliant), which is the diamond-cutting benchmark in North America. It was derived from mathematical calculations that considered both brilliance and fire of the stone. Marcel Tolkowsky found that if a diamond was cut too deep or shallow then light would escape out the sides or bottom of the diamond, resulting in a loss of brilliance (white light reflected up through the top of a diamond), fire (colored light reflected from within a diamond), and sparkle (combination of fire and brilliance).

The original model was intended to be a set of general guidelines; several aspects of a diamond's cut had not been accounted for or explored. Later modifications of round brilliants differ in minor ways.
