= Macle =

Term used in crystallography

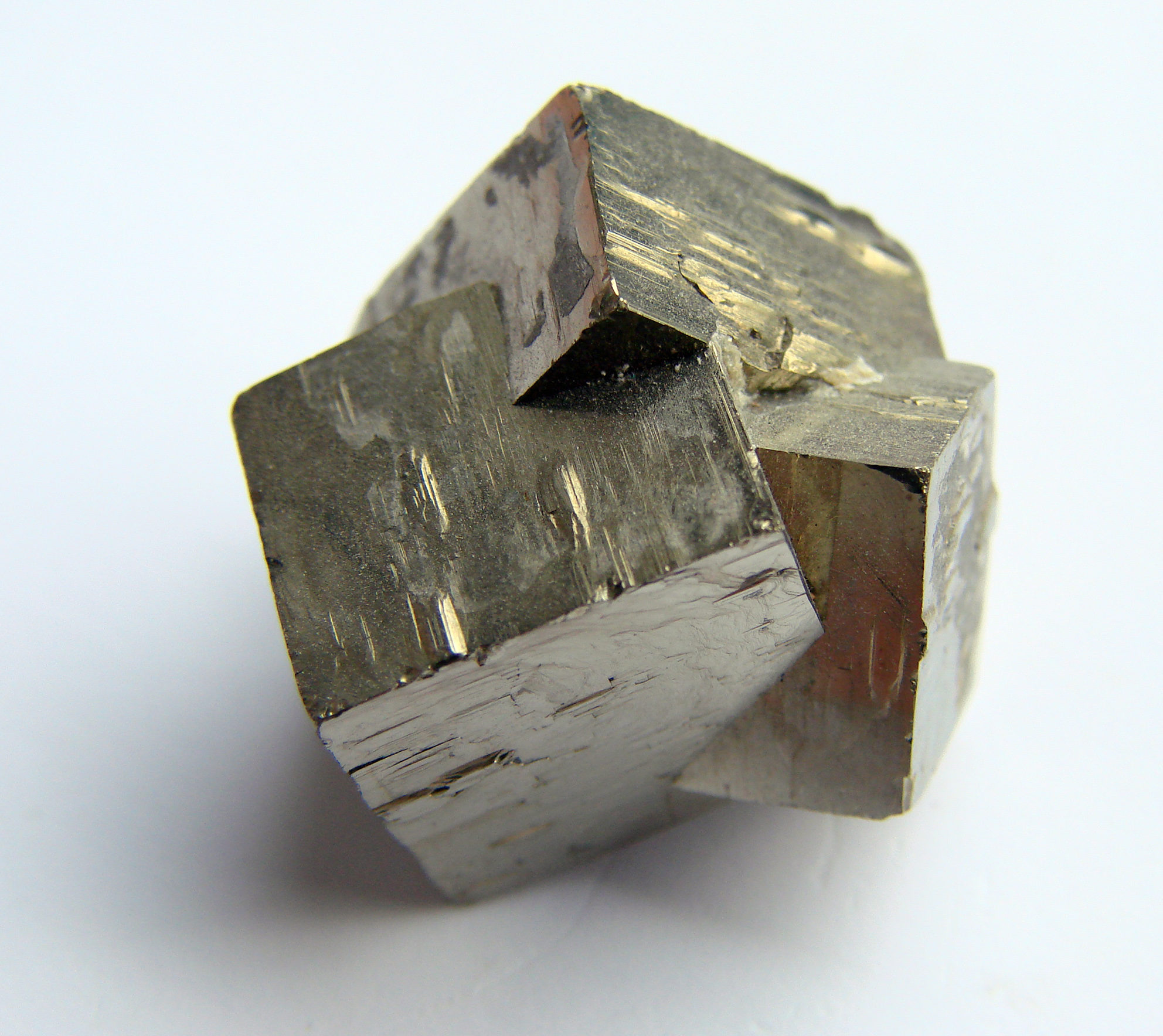
Macle formed by the merger of three pyrite crystals.

Macle is a term used in crystallography. It is a crystalline form, twin-crystal, or double crystal (such as chiastolite). It is crystallographic twin according to the spinel twin law and is seen in octahedral crystals or minerals such as diamond and spinel. The twin law name comes from the fact that is commonly observed in the mineral spinel. A version with five units about a common axis is called a fiveling.

Macle is an old French word, a heraldic term for a voided lozenge (one diamond shape within another). Etymologically the word is derived from the Latin macula meaning spot, mesh, or hole.

== Bibliography ==
- Georges Friedel (1904) "Étude sur les groupements cristallins", Extrait du Bulletin de la Société de l'Industrie minérale, Quatrième série, Tomes III e IV. Saint-Étienne, Société de l'Imprimerie Théolier J. Thomas et C., 485 pp.
- Georges Friedel (1920) "Contribution à l'étude géométrique des macles", Bulletin de la Société française de Minéralogie 43: 246-295.
- Georges Friedel (1926) Leçons de Cristallographie, Berger-Levrault, Nancy, Paris, Strasbourg XIX+602 pp.
- Georges Friedel (1933) "Sur un nouveau type de macles", Bulletin de la Société française de Minéralogie 56: 262-274.
- J.D.H. Donnay (1940) "Width of Albite-Twinning Lamellae", Am. Mineral., 25: 578-586.

== See also ==
- Macle in the French Wikipedia
