= Princess cut =

Diamond cut shape

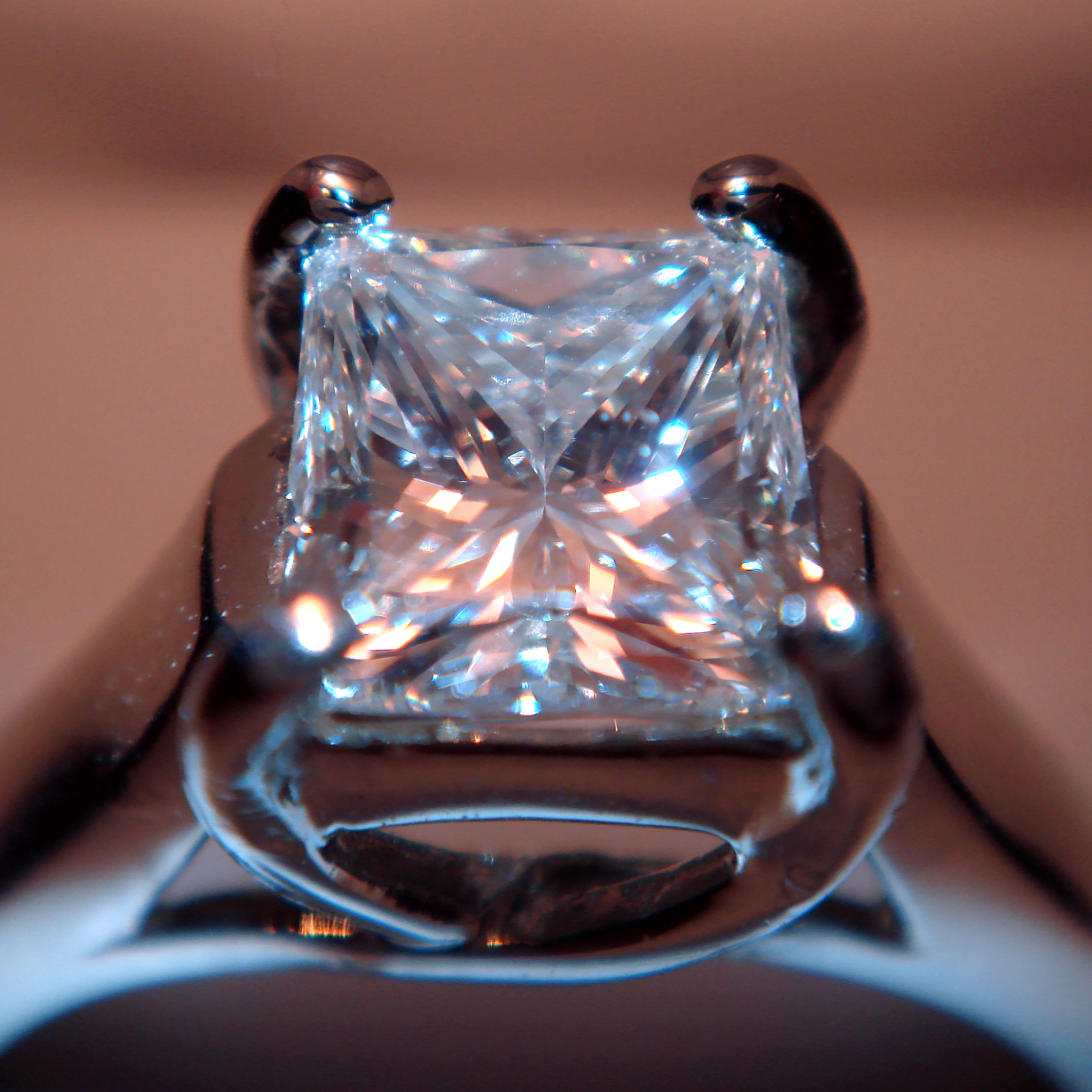
Princess cut diamond set in a ring

The princess cut (technical name 'square modified brilliant') is a diamond cut shape often used in engagement rings. The name dates back to the 1960s, while the princess cut as it exists was created by Betzalel Ambar, Ygal Perlman, and Israel Itzkowitz in 1980. The cut has a square or rectangular shape when viewed from above, and from the side is similar to that of an inverted pyramid with four beveled sides. Its popularity was at its highest in the 80s and 90s, though its popularity was high in the 2000s as well. It is the second most popular diamond cut, below round and above cushion.

== Characteristics ==
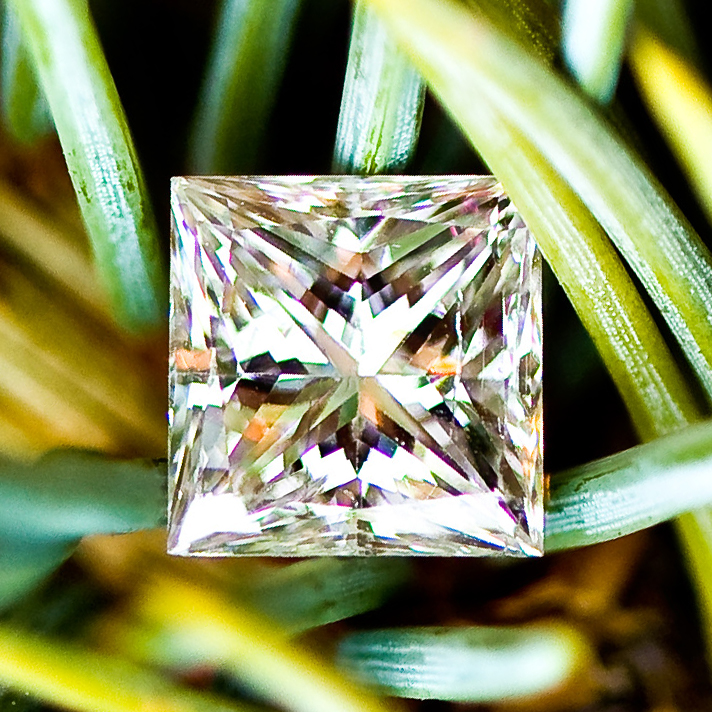
Princess cut, colorless diamond

The face-up shape of the princess cut (technical name 'square modified brilliant' is square or rectangular and the profile or side-on shape is similar to that of an inverted pyramid with four beveled sides. The design is sometimes considered feminine. When looked down on, it bears an X shape. They are slightly less expensive and less cut than round diamonds. The sharp points of the diamond make it more prone to damage. The number of chevrons can affect the overall outlook of a princess cut diamond. This can usually be determined by the wire diagram that is plotted in diamond grading reports. The princess cut had its origins in the early "French" cut.

== History ==
The name 'princess cut' was applied in the 1960s to a cut created by Arpad Nagy called the profile cut. Following this, more square cuts were given the name. These include the barion cut and the quadrillion cut, which were precursors to the current princess cut. It is one of the newest diamond shapes.

== Popularity ==
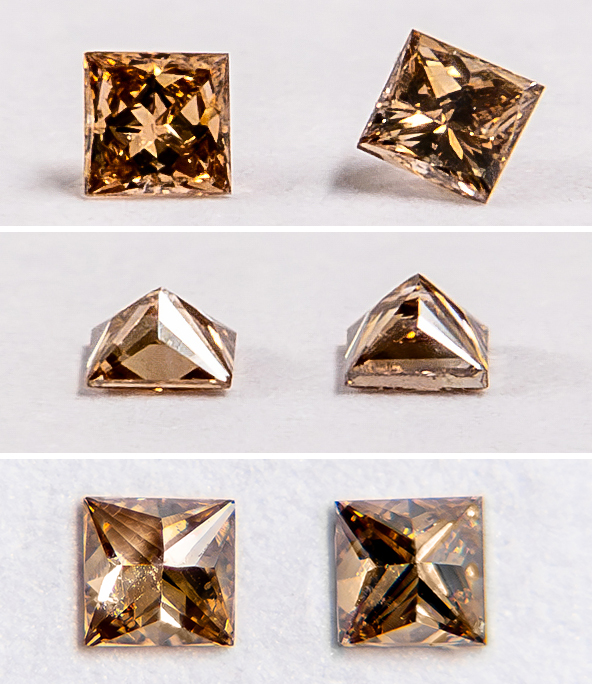
Two small princess cut coffee diamonds.

As of 2015, princess cut diamonds were the second most popular choice for an engagement ring. Approximately 30% of engagement rings use princess cut diamonds, behind round diamonds (50%) and ahead of cushions (8%). It saw its popularity at its peak in the 80s and 90s. The princess cut experienced a rise in popularity from the early 2000s to the mid 2000s. In the 2000s, the most popular engagement ring featured a princess cut diamond surrounded by round brilliant-cut diamonds. Disney in conjunction with Zales created a series of Disney Princess rings, with some of them, such as Aurora's, Fa Mulan's, Snow White's, and Tinker Bell's featuring princess cuts.

Princess cut diamonds have been used in different sports awards. The Chicago Cubs' trophy for their 2016 World Series win featured, among others, two princess cut diamonds. In 2018, the Washington Capitals' Stanley Cup rings featured 22 princess cut diamonds among hundreds of others.

== See also ==
- List of diamonds
