= List of people from Antwerp =

This is a list of notable people from Antwerp, who were either born in Antwerp, or spent part of their life there.

== Born in Antwerp ==
=== Pre-16th century ===
- Lionel of Antwerp, 1st Duke of Clarence, son of Edward III of England (1338–1368)
- Jacobus Barbireau, composer (1455–1491)
- Lucas Adriaens, painter (1459–1493)
- Daniel Bomberg, printer (c. 1475 – 1549)
- Joachim Sterck van Ringelbergh, scholar, humanist, mathematician, and astrologer (c. 1499 – c. 1556)

=== 16th century ===
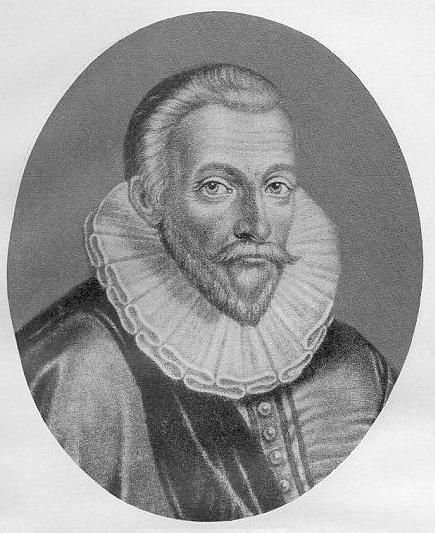
Jan Gruter

Pieter de Carpentier

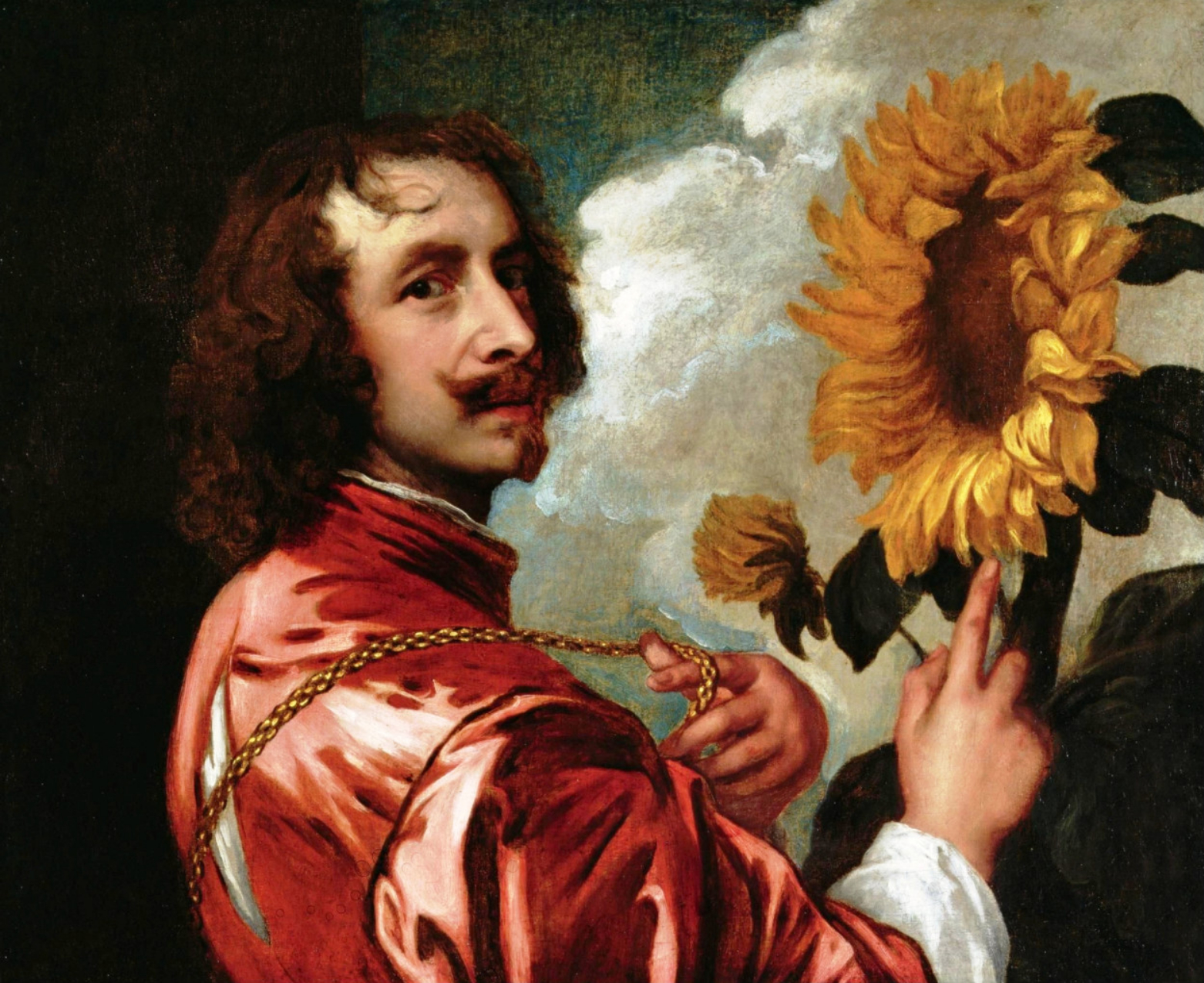
Anthony van Dyck self portrait

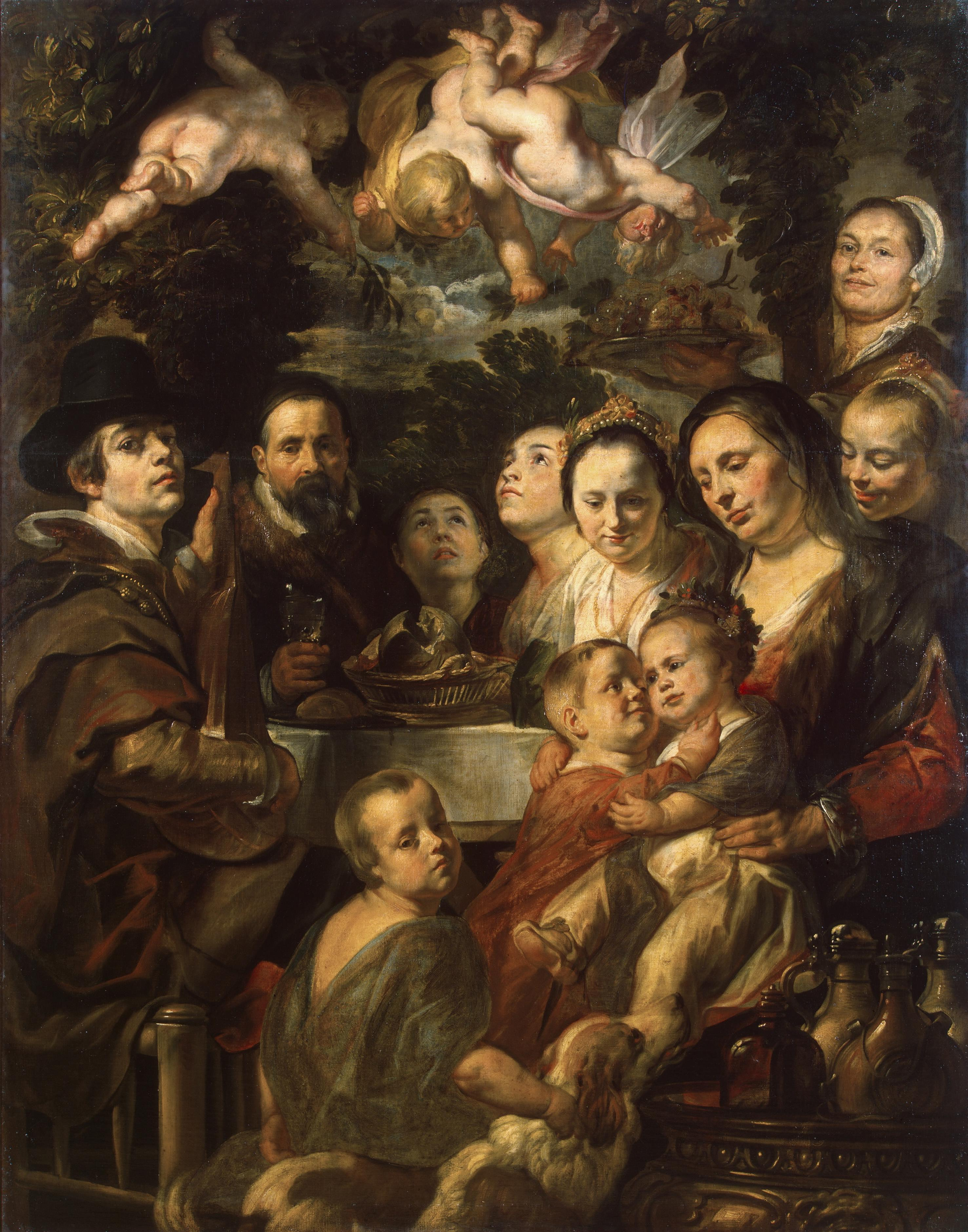
Jacob Jordaens, Self-Portrait with Parents, Brothers, and Sisters (ca. 1615)

- Hieronymus Cockx, painter and engraver (1510–1570)
- Hubert Waelrant, composer, teacher, and music editor of the Renaissance (c. 1517–1595)
- Frans Floris, painter (1520–1570)
- Abraham Ortelius, cartographer and geographer (1527–1598)
- Jacques Jonghelinck, sculptor and medalist (1530–1606)
- Emanuel van Meteren, historian and consul in London (1535–1612)
- Frédéric Perrenot de Granvelle, governor of Antwerp (1536–1602)
- Denis Calvaert, painter (1540–1619).
- Cornelis van Aarsens, statesman (1545–1627)
- Gillis van Coninxloo, painter of forest landscapes (1544–1607)
- Hans Collaert, engraver (c. 1545–1628)
- Joris Hoefnagel, painter and engraver (1545–1601)
- Bartholomeus Spranger, painter, draughtsman, and etcher (1546–1611)
- George de La Hèle (1547–1586), Franco-Flemish composer of the Renaissance
- Federigo Giambelli, Italian military and civil engineer (c. 1550-c. 1610)
- Paul Bril and Matthijs Bril, landscape painters (1554–1626, 1550–1583, respectively)
- Martin Delrio, Jesuit theologian (1551–1608)
- Andreas Schottus, academic, linguist, translator, and editor (1552–1629)
- Jan Gruter, critic and scholar (1560–1627).
- Jacob de Gheyn II, painter and engraver (1562–1629)
- Joachim van den Hove, composer and lutenist (c. 1567–1620)
- Frans Pourbus the younger, painter (1569–1622)
- Abraham Janssens, painter (c. 1570–1632)
- Ambrosius Bosschaert, still-life painter (1573–1621)
- Rodrigo Calderón, Count of Oliva, Spanish favourite and adventurer (died 1621)
- Gillis d'Hondecoeter, painter (birth in Antwerp uncertain, 1575/80–1638)
- Hendrick van Balen, painter (1575–1632)
- Frans Snyders, still-life and animal painter (1579–1657)
- Frans Hals, painter (1580–1666)
- Caspar de Crayer, painter (1582–1669)
- David Teniers the Elder, painter (1582–1649)
- Cornelis de Vos, painter (1584–1651)
- Jacob Le Maire, Dutch mariner (c. 1585–1616)
- Pieter de Carpentier, administrator and Governor-General of the Dutch East Indies (1586/88–1659)
- Antonius Sanderus, historian, philologian, and theologian (1586–1664)
- Guilielmus Messaus, composer (1589–1640)
- Jacob Jordaens, painter (1593–1678)
- Clara Peeters, painter (1594–c. 1657)
- Jean-Charles de la Faille, Jesuit mathematician (1597–1652)
- Justus Sustermans, Baroque painter (1597–1681)
- Anthony van Dyck, painter (1599–1641)
- Adriaen van Utrecht, painter (1599–1652)
- Francken, family of painters (16th and 17th century)

=== 17th and 18th century ===
- Quellinus, family of artists, painters, and sculptors (17th century)
- Gaspar Roomer, merchant and art patron (died 1674)
- Jan Brueghel the Younger, painter (1601–1678)
- François Ykens, painter (1601–1693)
- Theodorus Moretus, mathematician, theologian, geometer and Jesuit (1602–1667)
- Franciscus van den Enden, Baruch Spinoza's teacher (c. 1602 – 1674)
- Leonora Duarte, composer and musician (1610–1678)
- David Teniers the Younger, painter (1610–1690)
- Jan Fyt, animal painter (1611–1661)
- André Tacquet, mathematician (1612–1660)
- Gonzales Coques, painter (1614–1684)
- Carstian Luyckx, painter (c. 1623 – c. 1675)
- Arnold Geulincx (1624–1669), Flemish philosopher, metaphysician and logician
- Pieter Boel, still-life painter (1626–1674)
- Jan van Kessel, senior, still-life painter (1626–1679)
- Philip Fruytiers, painter (1627–1666)
- Jan Siberechts, painter (1627–1703)
- Abraham Brueghel, painter (1631–1690)
- Nikolaus van Hoy, Baroque painter, draughtsman, and etcher (1631–1679)
- David Teniers III, painter (1638–1685)
- Francisque Millet (1642–1679), Flemish-French landscape painter
- David de Coninck, painter (c. 1644 – c. 1701)
- Cornelis Huysmans (1648–1727), Flemish landscape painter.
- Gerard Edelinck, copper-plate engraver (1649–1707)
- Emmanuel Schelstrate (1649–1692), Roman Catholic theologian
- Pseudo-Simons (1650–1680), painter
- Jan van Kessel the Younger (1654–1708), painter
- Sebastiaen Slodtz (1655–1726), Flemish sculptor and decorator
- Thomas Quellinus, Baroque sculptor (1661–1709)
- Jan Frans van Bloemen, painter (1662–1740)
- Jan Frans van Bredael, painter (1683–1750)
- Peter Scheemakers, sculptor (1691–1781)
- John Michael Rysbrack, sculptor (1694–1770)

=== 19th century ===
- Egide Charles Gustave Wappers, painter (1803–1874)
- Guillaume Geefs, sculptor (1805–1883)
- Hendrik Conscience, writer and author of De Leeuw van Vlaanderen ("The Lion of Flanders") (1812–1883)
- Jan August Hendrik Leys, painter (1815–1869)
- Jan van Beers, poet (1821–1888)
- Johann Coaz, Swiss forester, topographer and mountaineer (1822–1918)
- Michel Marie Charles Verlat, painter (1824–1890)
- Henri Jean Augustin de Braekeleer, painter (1840–1888).
- Julien Dillens, sculptor (1849–1904)
- Jef Lambeaux, sculptor (1852–1908)
- Georges Eekhoud, novelist (1854–1927)
- Libert H. Boeynaems, vicar apostolic of the Hawaiian islands (1857–1926)
- Hippolyte Delehaye, Jesuit and hagiographic scholar (1859–1941)
- Arthur Van Gehuchten, anatomist (1861–1914/15)
- Henry van de Velde, painter, architect, and interior designer (1863–1957)
- Eugénie Hamer (1865–after 1926), peace activist
- Johannes Jacobus Smith, botanist (1867–1947)
- Pierre de Caters, adventurer, aviator, car and motorboat racer (1875–1944)
- Eugeen Van Mieghem, painter (1875–1930)
- Willem Elsschot, writer and poet (1882–1960)
- Camille Clifford, actress (1885–1971)
- Constant Permeke, expressionist painter (1886–1952)
- Jef van Hoof, composer and conductor, (1886–1959)
- Georges Vantongerloo, abstract sculptor and painter (1886–1965)
- Jean Langenus, international football referee (1891–1952)
- Pierre Ryckmans, head of the Belgian colony of Congo (1891–1959)
- Paul van Ostaijen, poet and writer (1896–1928)
- Marnix Gijsen, writer (1899–1984)

=== 20th century ===
- Albert Lilar, Minister of Justice (1900–1976)
- Gérard Blitz, water polo player (1901–1990)
- Lode Zielens, novelist and journalist (1901–1944)
- George Koltanowski, chess player and promoter (1903–2000)
- Frédérique Petrides, (née Frédérique Mayer) orchestral conductor and publisher (1903–1983)
- Karel Bossart, rocket designer (1904–1975)
- Frank Murdoch, British engineer and competive sailor (1904–1996)
- Maurice Anthony Biot, physicist and founder of the theory of poroelasticity (1905–1985)
- André Cluytens, conductor (1905–1967)
- Jef Maes, composer (1905–1996)
- Georges Ronsse, cyclo-cross and road bicycle racer (1906–1969)
- Maurice van Essche, Belgian-born South African painter (1906–1977)
- Edmond de Goeyse, student leader (1907–1998)
- Jean Servais, actor (1910–1976)
- Renaat Braem, architect and urban planner (born 1910)
- Willy Vandersteen, creator of comic books (1913–1990)
- Edward Schillebeeckx, theologian (1914–2009)
- Hubert Lampo, writer (1920–2006)
- Guy Thys, national football coach (1922–2003)
- Jan Yoors, photographer, painter, sculptor, writer, and Gypsy (1922–1977)
- Karel Goeyvaerts, composer (1923–1993)
- Jacques Sternberg, writer of science fiction (1923–2006)
- Ward de Ravet, actor (1924–2013)
- Leo Apostel, philosopher (1925–1995)
- Bob de Moor, comic artist (1925–1992)
- Karel Dillen, politician (1925–2007)
- Bobbejaan Schoepen, entertainer, singer, guitarist, composer, and actor (1925–2010)
- Paul Van Hoeydonck, printmaker and painter (1925–2025)
- Victor Mees, footballer (1927–2010)
- Jef Nys, comic book creator (1927–2009)
- Henry Spira, animal rights activist (1927–1998)
- Lilly Appelbaum Malnik, Holocaust survivor (born 1928)
- Bob Van der Veken, television actor (1928–2019)
- Maurice Tempelsman, diamond merchant and industrialist (born 1929)
- Jan Vansina, historian and anthropologist (1929–2017)
- Françoise Mallet-Joris, writer and member of the Académie Goncourt (born 1930)
- Bert Eriksson, neo-Nazi and Flemish nationalist (1931–2005)
- Simon Kornblit, film studio executive for Universal Pictures (1933–2010)
- Marc Rich, international commodities trader (1934–2013)
- Henry Geldzahler, curator of contemporary art (1935–1994)
- Fernando Sanchez, Spanish fashion designer (1935–2006)
- Martine Franck, photographer (1938–2012)
- Willy Steveniers, former professional basketball player (born 1938)
- Harry Kümel, film director (born 1940)
- Jean-Baptiste Baronian, critic, essayist, writer, and novelist (born 1942)
- Magda Francot, painter (born 1942)
- Hugo Heyrman, painter and multimedia artist (born 1942)
- Wim Blockmans, writer and professor of medieval history at Leiden University (born 1945)
- Ann Christy, singer (1945–1984)
- David Abraham (born 1946), American legal scholar and historian
- Georges Pintens, road bicycle racer (born 1946)
- Guillaume Bijl, artist (born 1946)
- Carl Verbraeken, composer (born 1950)
- Ronald Zollman, conductor (born 1950)
- Anne-Mie van Kerckhoven, painter, drawer, computer and video artist (born 1951)
- Ludo Coeck, footballer (1955–1985)
- Patrick Janssens, Socialist politician and mayor of Antwerp (born 1956)
- Jan Fabre, drawer, sculptor, director, writer, choreographer, and designer (born 1958)
- Jan Leyers, singer, songwriter, and television personality (born 1958)
- Dries Van Noten, fashion designer (born 1958)
- Luc Cromheecke, comic artist (born 1961)
- Rita Bellens, politician (born 1962)
- Robert C. Hancké, economist (born 1962)
- Rudy Trouvé, musician (born 1967)
- Tom Waes, television presenter, television director and actor (born 1968)
- Els Callens, professional tennis player (born 1970)
- Tom Barman, film director, musician, and singer of dEUS (born 1972)
- Alex Agnew, stand-up comedian (born 1972)
- Anke Vandermeersch, politician and former beauty queen (born 1972)
- Christian Olde Wolbers, bassist of the industrial metal band Fear Factory (born 1972)
- Mike Dierickx, also known as M.I.K.E., DJ and music producer (born 1973)
- An Pierlé, pianist and singer-songwriter (born 1974)
- Matthias Schoenaerts, actor (born 1977)
- Steven De Lelie, actor and director (born 1977)
- Jeffrey van Hooydonk, racing car driver (born 1977)
- Tia Hellebaut, track and field athlete (born 1978)
- Evi Goffin, vocalist of the musical group Lasgo (born 1981)
- Sam van Rooy (born1985), Belgian politician for Vlaams Belang, author, blogger, and former professional cyclist
- Mousa Dembélé, former professional footballer (born 1987)
- Radja Nainggolan, professional footballer (born 1988)
- Toby Alderweireld, professional footballer (born 1989)
- Jean-Marc Mwema, professional basketball player (born 1989)
- Laetitia Beck, Belgian-born Israeli golfer (born 1992)
- Romelu Lukaku, professional footballer (born 1993)
- Coely Mbueno, singer (born 1994)
- Tamino, musician (born 1996)
- Mile Svilar, professional footballer (born 1999)
- Jérémie Makiese (born 2000), Belgian-Congolese singer and footballer who represented Belgium in the Eurovision Song Contest 2022
- Yisroel Mantel, Orthodox rabbi

=== 21st century ===
- Jérémy Doku, professional footballer (born 2002)

== Lived in Antwerp ==
=== Pre-16th century ===
- Saint Pirmin, monk (c. 670–753)
- Lodewyk van Berken, inventor of the scaif (15th century)
- Johannes Pullois, Franco-Flemish composer (died 1478)
- Matthaeus Pipelare, composer, choir director, and wind instrument player (c. 1450 – c. 1515)
- Quentin Matsys, Renaissance painter, founder of the Antwerp school (1466–1530)
- Pierre Alamire, music copyist, composer, instrumentalist, mining engineer, merchant, diplomat, and spy (c. 1470 – 1536)
- Jan Mabuse, painter (c. 1478 – 1532)
- Jacob van Utrecht, painter (c. 1479 – c. 1525)
- Joachim Patinir, landscape and religious painter (c. 1480 – 1524)
- Richard Aertsz, historical painter (1482–1577)

=== 16th century ===
- John Rogers, Minister of religion, Bible translator and commentator, and martyr (c. 1500 – 1555)
- Jan Sanders van Hemessen, painter (c. 1500 – c. 1566)
- Tielman Susato, composer, instrumentalist, and publisher of music (c. 1510/15 – after 1570)
- Joos van Cleve, painter (c. 1500 – 1540/41)
- Damião de Góis, Portuguese humanist philosopher (1502–1574)
- Gerard de Jode, cartographer, engraver, and publisher (1509–1591)
- Steven Mierdman, printer (born c. 1510)
- Gracia Mendes Nasi, wealthy businesswoman (1510–1569)
- Hans Hendrik van Paesschen, architect (c. 1510 – 1582)
- Johannes Goropius Becanus, physician, linguist, and humanist (1519–1572)
- Thomas Gresham, English merchant and financier (c. 1519 – 1579)
- Anthony More, portrait painter (1520 – c. 1577)
- Christoffel Plantijn, humanist, book printer and publisher (c. 1520 – 1589)
- Crispin van den Broeck, painter (1523–1591)
- Pieter Brueghel the Elder, painter and printmaker (1525–1569)
- Thomas Cartwright, English Puritan churchman (c. 1535 – 1603)
- Philippe Galle, designer and engraver (1537–1612)
- Philip van Marnix, writer and statesman (1538–1598)
- Andreas Pevernage, composer (1542/43–1591)
- Jan Moretus, printer (1543–1610)
- François d'Aguilon, mathematician and physicist (1546–1617)
- Simon Stevin, mathematician and engineer (c. 1548 – 1620)
- Federigo Giambelli, Italian military engineer (born c. 1550)
- Louis de Caullery, painter (c. 1560 – 1621/22)
- Dudley Fenner, English Puritan divine (c. 1558 – 1587)
- Jan Vermeyen, goldsmith (c. 1559 – 1606)
- Richard Rowlands, antiquary (c. 1560 – 1620)
- John Bull, Welsh composer, musician, and organ builder (c. 1562 – 1628)
- Cornelis Verdonck, composer (1563–1625)
- Jan Brueghel the Elder, also known as "Velvet" Brueghel, painter (1568–1625)
- Peter Paul Rubens, painter (1577–1640)
- William Cavendish, 1st Duke of Newcastle, English soldier, politician, and writer (c. 1592 – 1676)
- Abraham van Diepenbeeck, erudite and painter (1596–1675)
- Ignatius of Loyola, founder of the Jesuit Order

=== 17th and 18th century ===
- Adriaen Brouwer, painter (1605–1638)
- Jan Davidszoon de Heem, painter (1606–1684)
- Wenceslas Hollar, Bohemian etcher (1607–1677)
- Jan Lievens, painter (1607–1674)
- Thomas Willeboirts Bosschaert, painter (1613–1656)
- Peter Talbot, Roman Catholic archbishop of Dublin (1620–1680)
- Charles II of England, king in exile in Antwerp (1630–1685)
- Jan Frans Willems, writer (1793–1846)

=== 19th century ===
- Abraham van der Waeyen Pieterszen, painter (1817–1880)
- Henri Alexis Brialmont, military engineer (1821–1903)
- Lawrence Alma-Tadema, painter (1836–1912)
- Albrecht De Vriendt (Ghent, 1843 – Antwerp, 1900), painter of genre scenes, history paintings, interiors and figure paintings
- De Vriendt brothers, painters (born 1842/43)
- Jan De Vos, mayor (1844–1923)
- Vincent van Gogh, impressionist painter, lived in Antwerp for about four months (1853–1890)
- Neel Doff, writer (1858–1942)
- Walter Osborne, Irish impressionist (1859–1903)
- Asriel Günzig, rabbi (1868–1931)
- Camille Huysmans, Socialist politician and former Prime Minister of Belgium (1871–1968)
- Jules Van Nuffel, musicologist, composer, and expert on religious music (1883–1953)

=== 20th century ===
- Albert Lilar, Minister of Justice (1900–1976)
- Suzanne Lilar, writer (1901–1992)
- Charlotte Bergman, art collector (1903–2002)
- Chaim Kreiswirth, Chief Rabbi (1918–2001)
- Jan Cox, painter (1919–1980)
- Hugo Schiltz, lawyer and politician (1927–2006)
- Françoise Mallet-Joris, writer (1930–2016)
- Tony Mafia American-Belgian painter, sculptor, and singer-songwriter (né Robert Lee Alderson, 1931 – 1999)
- Godfried Danneels, archbishop and cardinal (1933–2019)
- Myriam Sarachik, physicist and recipient of the Buckley Prize in 2005 (1933–2021)
- Giya Kancheli, Georgian composer (1935–2019)
- Wannes Van de Velde, singer, musician, poet (1937–2008)
- Ward Beysen, politician and freemason (1941–2005)
- Robbe De Hert, film director (1942–2020)
- Robert Cailliau, co-developer of the World Wide Web (born 1947)
- Roberto Mangou, painter (born 1950)
- Luc Tuymans, artist and painter (born 1958)
- The "Antwerp Six": Walter Van Beirendonck (born 1957), Ann Demeulemeester (born 1959), Dries van Noten (born 1958), Dirk Van Saene, Dirk Bikkembergs (born 1959), and Marina Yee, fashion designers
- Martin Margiela, fashion designer (born 1959)
- Matthias Storme, lawyer, academic, thinker, and politician (born 1959)
- Stef Bos, singer (born 1961)
- Filip Dewinter, politician (born 1962)
- Erik Van Looy, film director (born 1962)
- Anne Provoost, author of myths, tales, and bible stories (born 1964)
- Fons Borginon, politician and lawyer (born 1966)
- Stef Driesen, artist (born 1966)
- Raf Simons, fashion designer (born 1968)
- Mauro Pawlowski, guitar player of dEUS and Evil Superstars (born 1971)
- David Palmer, squash player (born 1976)
- Matthias Schoenaerts, actor (born 1977)
- Veerle Casteleyn, ballet and jazz dancer (born 1978)
- Jessica Van Der Steen, model (born 1984)
- Rustemi Kreshnik, kickboxer (born 1984)
- Yves V, DJ, producer and electronic musician (born 1981)
- Raveena Mehta, singer-songwriter (born 1997)
