= Frank Peeters =

Belgian fine art photographer (born 1947)

- Born: July 1947 (age 78); Antwerp, Belgium
- Occupation: Photographer
- Website: frankpeetersphotography.com

Frank Peeters (Dutch: [frɑŋk ˈpeːtərs]; born 1947) is a Belgian fine-art photographer.

== Career ==
In 1983, Peeters won the first prize in the first Biennal Internacional de Arte Fotografica/Escola Panamericana del Arte in São Paulo, Brazil, followed by international exhibitions and publications.

In 1984, his show, Greetings from Belgium, was exhibited at The Photographers' Gallery in London.

=== Awards ===
- 1981/82, 1982/83, 1983/84, 1984/85, 1987/88: first prize Nikon, Japan. Photo Contest International
- 1982 Associateship (ARPS) of the Royal Photographic Society, Bath, United Kingdom (ARPS)
- 1983 First Prize le Biennal Internacional de Arte Fotografica /Escola Panamericana del Arte São Paulo, Brazil

=== Solo exhibitions ===
- 1983 Galerie Paule Pia, Antwerp, Belgium - Visions
- Brewery Arts Centre, Kendal, UK. "New Belgian Photography" 1984 -Frank Peeters, Carl Fonteyne, Pierre Cordier and Hubert Grooteclaes
- Exhibition "New Belgian Photography", 3 October/3 November 1984
- 1984 The Photographers' Gallery, London, UK -Greetings from Belgium
- 1984 Studio Ethel, Boulevard St. Germain, Paris, France -Contrasts
- 1984 Photofactory, Chateau Neuf, Oslo, Norway -Greetings from Belgium
- 1985 Galerie The Compagnie, Hamburg, Germany -Contrasts & Visions
- 1985 Nikon Gallery, London, UK -Contrasts
- 1986 La Boîte à Images, Bern, Switzerland -Contrasts & Visions
- 1986 Galerie Nei Liicht, Dudelange, Luxembourg - Contrasts
- 1988 The Swan Tower, Kleve, Germany - Retrospective 1980/87

== Books ==
- Frank Peeters Copyright, Monography 1988 by Edition Schwanenburg IM Artcolor Verlag D-4700 Hamm, Germany ISBN 3-89261-402-4
- Contrasts & Visions, Frank Peeters, 1983 Introduction by B.Coe, I.Leijerzapf, D.Bohm, K.Van Deuren, R.Lassam
- Selection of Work by Frank Peeters (monography) 1987 Royal Photographic Society, Bath, United Kingdom )
- Frank Peeters – Photographs 1970–1990, 2008, (13×11 in, 33×28 cm)

== See also ==
- List of people from Antwerp
- List of photographers
