= Erditse =

God or goddess of the ancient Aquitaine Gaul

Erditse is a god or goddess of the ancient Aquitaine Gaul, known by only one inscription which was discovered, in the 16th century, by Joseph Justus Scaliger on a votive altar found in the Parliament of Toulouse. The inscription was published in Inscriptiones totius orbis Romani antiquae by Jan Gruter. The votive altar has now disappeared. It was likely to come from the Pyrenees as many other votive altars found in the region of Comminges and dated from the 1st to the 4th century.

The inscription was correctly deciphered for the first time by Eugène Camoreyt: Erditse d[eo?] / consacran(i) / Borodates / v(otum) s(olvit) l(ibens) m(erito). It suggests the existence of an association of people worshipping together this deity.

It is a name in the Aquitanian language (ancient Basque) name, with same phoneme (TS) as in Herauscorritsehe (CIL 409) and Selatse (or Stelatse, found in Barabarin, Navarre). The main part "erdi", can be explained by the modern basque noun "erdi" (half), and the verb "erdi" (give birth) or erdietsi (To obtain, to mange).
