= Erez Daleyot =

Belgian-Israeli diamond dealer

- ארז דליות
- Occupations: Businessman, diamond dealer
- Organization: D.D. Manufacturing

Erez Daleyot (Hebrew: ארז דליות; born circa 1956) is a Belgian-Israeli diamond dealer, who may have once controlled one-third of all trade in diamonds worldwide. In April 2022 he was arrested in Zimbabwe for suspected tax evasion in South Africa.

== Career ==
=== Early career to 2015 ===
In September 2004 he was owner and managing director of DD Manufacturing Group of Companies (DDM), and that month he purchased the company Jacob & Co. In 2005, he reported $886 million in revenue. In 2006, after the arrest of New York-based diamond dealer Jacob Arabo (known as "Jacob the Jeweler") on charges of laundering $270 million in drug money, it was reported that Daleyot was one of his financiers and owned 50% of his jewellery business. Haaretz reported that Daleyot was operating out of Antwerp and had annual sales topping $200 million according to Israeli estimates. It also wrote that "Daleyot and Belgian Jewish partner Maurice Tempelsman are both known for their integrity, so it is unlikely that they knew of Arabov's alleged illegal activities."

In January 2011 he was officially group CEO of DD Manufacturing. In 2011, he was accused of participating in a theft scheme with two banks, KBC Bank and Antwerp Diamond Bank, of $135 million, by diamond dealer Lazare Kaplan. The lawsuit filed in New York did not name him as a direct defendant. In 2011, he flew in his private jet to South Africa. Prior to that, he had been a representative of De Beers, the world's largest diamond dealer.

=== 2014 to 2023 ===
In 2014, he was "cut off" from De Beers, and his own businesses began to suffer. When a court-appointed administrator appeared in his offices to oversee bankruptcy, then a floor of the Antwerp World Diamond Center, the offices were described as essentially empty. Diamonds and assets were described as missing, with Daleyot leaving a debt of €360 million. By 2021, the bankruptcy matter was to be settled in Antwerp in October 2021.

In December 2015, Daleyot was arrested in Johannesburg on fraud charges, and released on bail.

In February 2016, the Antwerp Court of Appeals declared his former company, D.D. Manufacturing, bankrupt, owing about $230 million, while Daleyot was allegedly "hiding out in Israel or South Africa". In April 2022 he was arrested in Zimbabwe for evading taxes in South Africa.

== Personal life ==
In 2011, he had a personal home in Wilrijk, regularly visiting South Africa, New York, and Tel Aviv. He had an art collection with works by artists such as Andy Warhol, Jeff Koons and Joan Miró. The collection was estimated to be worth €26 million.
