= Cats: Highlights from the Motion Picture Soundtrack =

2019 soundtrack by various artists

Soundtrack album by various artists
- Released: December 20, 2019
- Recorded: 2019
- Genre: Soundtrack; show tune
- Length: 59:00
- Label: Polydor; Republic
- Producer: Andrew Lloyd Webber; Tom Hooper; David Wilson; Nile Rodgers

Cats: Highlights from the Motion Picture Soundtrack is the soundtrack album to the 2019 film Cats. It features contributions from Taylor Swift, Jason Derulo, Jennifer Hudson, James Corden, Idris Elba, Ian McKellen, and other artists.

== Release ==
The album was released through Polydor Records and in the U.S. by Republic Records on December 20, 2019. The music for the film was composed by Andrew Lloyd Webber.

== Reception ==
The song "Beautiful Ghosts" by Taylor Swift, the first promotional single from the soundtrack album, was released on November 15, 2019. The song was nominated for Best Original Song at the 77th Golden Globe Awards and Best Song Written for Visual Media at the 63rd Annual Grammy Awards.

== Track listing ==
Credits adapted from iTunes, Apple Music, Spotify, Tidal, and Amazon Music.

All tracks are written by Andrew Lloyd Webber (music) & T.S. Eliot (lyrics), except where noted.
All tracks are produced by Lloyd Webber, Tom Hooper and David Wilson, except where noted.

Cats: Highlights from the Motion Picture Soundtrack
No.	Title	Performer(s)	Length
1.	"Overture" (Writers: Andrew Lloyd Webber)	Lloyd Webber	1:38
2.	"Prologue: Jellicle Songs for Jellicle Cats" (Writers: Lloyd Webber, T.S. Eliot, Trevor Nunn, Richard Stilgoe)	Cast of the Motion Picture Cats	4:49
3.	"The Old Gumbie Cat" (Writers: Lloyd Webber, Eliot)	Rebel Wilson; Robbie Fairchild	4:32
4.	"The Rum Tum Tugger" (Writers: Lloyd Webber, Eliot)	Jason Derulo	3:48
5.	"Bustopher Jones: The Cat About Town" (Writers: Lloyd Webber, Eliot)	James Corden; Derulo; Cory English; Idris Elba	3:42
6.	"Mungojerrie and Rumpleteazer" (Writers: Lloyd Webber, Eliot)	Danny Collins; Naoimh Morgan; Francesca Hayward	3:54
7.	"Old Deuteronomy" (Writers: Lloyd Webber, Eliot)	Fairchild; Judi Dench	3:08
8.	"Beautiful Ghosts (Victoria's Song)" (Writers: Lloyd Webber, Taylor Swift)	Hayward	2:50
9.	"Magical Gus (Intro)" (Writers: Lloyd Webber)	Lloyd Webber	0:36
10.	"Gus: The Theatre Cat" (Writers: Lloyd Webber, Eliot)	Ian McKellen	3:59
11.	"Skimbleshanks: The Railway Cat" (Writers: Lloyd Webber, Eliot)	Steven McRae; Fairchild	4:00
12.	"Macavity: The Mystery Cat" (Writers: Lloyd Webber, Eliot; Producers: Hooper, Nile Rodgers, Wilson)	Swift; Elba	5:11
13.	"Mr. Mistoffelees" (Writers: Lloyd Webber, Eliot)	Laurie Davidson; Fairchild; Dench; Hayward	4:41
14.	"Memory" (Writers: Lloyd Webber, Eliot, Nunn)	Jennifer Hudson; Hayward	4:24
15.	"The Ad-Dressing of Cats" (Writers: Lloyd Webber, Eliot)	Dench	3:27
16.	"Beautiful Ghosts" (Writers: Swift, Lloyd Webber; Producers: Hooper, Lloyd Webber)	Swift	4:21
Total length:			59:00

== Charts ==
Chart (2019–2020)	Peak position
Australian Albums (ARIA)	31
Japanese Albums (Oricon)	33
Scottish Albums (OCC)	50
UK Albums (OCC)	44
UK Soundtrack Albums (OCC)	3
US Soundtrack Albums (Billboard)	8
