= Center for National Policy =

American public policy think tank

The Center for National Policy

The Center for National Policy (CNP) is an American non-profit public policy think tank headquartered in Washington, D.C.

== History ==
The Center for National Policy was founded in 1981. Peter Kovler, director of the Marjorie Kovler Fund, serves as chairman of the center, succeeding Leon Panetta, CNP's national advisory board chair and former White House Chief of Staff.

Previous presidents and chairmen of CNP include the U.S. ambassador to India and former six-term member of Congress, Tim Roemer, and three former U.S. Secretaries of State: Madeleine Albright, Edmund Muskie, and Cyrus Vance. Other CNP Board members have included former U.S. Treasury Secretary Robert Rubin, former Speaker of the U.S. House of Representatives Thomas Foley, former Republican members of Congress Jack Buechner and Rod Chandler, and former Democratic members of Congress John Brademas and Michael Barnes.

== Edmund S. Muskie Distinguished Public Service Award ==
The Edmund S. Muskie Distinguished Public Service Award honors the late Edmund Muskie (1914–1996), who served the U.S. in the Navy, as governor of Maine, as U.S. senator and as U.S. Secretary of State. Following his retirement from government service, Ed Muskie chaired the CNP board. Since 1996, the Muskie Award has been presented at an annual event honoring the recipients’ contributions to the country. Recipients included:

1996: Secretary Madeleine Albright, U.S. State Department

1997: Lee Hamilton, U.S. House of Representatives

1998: Hillary Clinton, U.S. Senate

1999: Christopher Dodd, U.S. Senate; John Warner, U.S. Senate

2000: William Cohen, Secretary of Defense

2002: Charles Rangel, U.S. House of Representatives; Amory Houghton, Jr., U.S. House of Representatives

2003: Robert Byrd, U.S. Senate; Richard Lugar, U.S. Senate

2004: Charles Hagel, U.S. Senate; Edward Kennedy, U.S. Senate

2005: John McCain, U.S. Senate; Mark Warner, Governor of Virginia

2006: John Murtha, U.S. House of Representatives

2007: Nancy Pelosi, U.S. House of Representatives; Susan Collins, U.S. Senate

2008: Joe Biden, U.S. Senate; General Brent Scowcroft, former National Security Advisor

2009: Dianne Feinstein, U.S. Senate; General James Mattis, commander, U.S. Joint Forces Command

2010: Governor Edward G. Rendell, Commonwealth of Pennsylvania; Police Commissioner Raymond W. Kelly, City of New York

2012: Secretary Leon Panetta, U.S. Department of Defense

2014: Dick Durbin, U.S. Senate

== President ==
In January 2012, Scott Bates became the seventh president of the Center for National Policy. Bates has served as chief of staff for Congressman Nick Lampson, counsel to Congressman Jim Turner, and senior advisor to Congressman Maurice Hinchey. After the September 11, 2001, attacks, he became the first senior policy advisor to the U.S. House of Representatives Homeland Security Committee and was the principal author of Winning the War on Terror, which helped inform the 9/11 commission in its deliberations and the development of its report.

== Directors ==
- Peter B. Kovler, chairman (CNP), The Marjorie Kovler Fund, Washington, D.C.
- Michael Evans, Counsel, K&L Gates, Washington, D.C.
- Michael Barnes, director, Covington & Burling, Washington, D.C.
- John Brademas, director, New York University, New York, New York
- John Bridgeland, director, Civic Enterprises, Washington, D.C.
- Rev. Cn. Robert J. Brooks, director, Episcopal Diocese of Connecticut, Storrs, Connecticut
- Jack Buechner, director, Anderson Kill & Olick, Washington, D.C.
- Robert Cavnar, director, Milagro Exploration, Houston, Texas
- Elizabeth Folsom, director, Academy for Educational Development, Washington, D.C.
- John Freidenrich, director, Regis Management Company, Palo Alto, California
- David Geanacopoulos, director, Volkswagen of America, Washington, D.C.
- Daniel Glickman, director, Motion Picture Association of America, Washington, D.C.
- Lester Hyman, director, Swidler & Berlin, Washington, D.C.
- Markos Kounalakis, director, The Washington Monthly, Washington, D.C.
- Ira Lechner, director, Katz & Ranzman
- Paul McHale, director, McKenna Long & Aldridge
- Maurice Tempelsman, director, Lazare Kaplan International, New York, New York
- Samuel Tenenbaum, director, Lexington, South Carolina
- Peter Thoren, director, Access Industries, New York, New York
