= Veerle Casteleyn =

Belgian actor and ballerina (born 1978)

- Born: 6 March 1978 (age 47); Belgium
- Occupations: Actress; ballerina; singer

Veerle Casteleyn (born 6 March 1978, in Vlaanderen, Belgium) is a Belgian musical theatre performer and ballerina.

== Biography ==
Casteleyn trained at the De Koninklijke Balletschool van Antwerpen in Belgium, and during her training, she was in various plays such as:

- Joint Venture
- Initiate
- Fanfare
- The Three Musketeers (short piece)
- Self Made

After leaving school, she performed in various shows in Belgium such as:

- Annie
- The Sound of Music
- Cats
- The Sound of Music (revival)

In 1997, Casteleyn moved to London to play the role of Jemima in the 1998 video production of Cats. After the video, she took on several roles as part of the swing in the West End's production of Cats. Soon after, she started to perform as Jemima on a regular basis; she also understudied the roles of Victoria and Rumpleteazer. After Cats, she joined the UK tour of Carousel as Louise. After the tour was over, Casteleyn went back to her homeland of Belgium and performed as Fredrika in the European tour of A Little Night Music.

In 2002, Casteleyn landed the role of Julia in the Belgian production of the French hit, "Roméo et Juliette: de la Haine à l’Amour" (appropriately renamed "Romeo en Julia: van Haat tot Liefde"). It was her first lead role and her first time releasing a CD with her voice on it.

After "Romeo en Julia", Casteleyn starred as Chava in the Straight From the Heart production of Fiddler on the Roof. After a short hiatus, she moved on to television, becoming a cast member on the Belgian TV show De Wet volgens Milo as Sonja, an intern at a law firm. At the end of 2005, she took part in the Belgian version of the Czech musical Dracula, as a part of the ensemble.

In 2006, Casteleyn was a part of the ensemble in the Antwerp production of the ABBA song-inspired musical Mamma Mia!. On 9 August, she began rehearsals for the new Dutch production of Cats, in which she was a swing member (1st cover for Electra, 1st cover for Sylvani aka Jemima, and 2nd cover for Victoria). She took over the role of Jemima full-time in the summer of 2007. Cats premiered in Rotterdam in October, and toured the Netherlands until October 2007.

In 2010, she was part of the ensemble in the Belgian production of Oliver!.

After Oliver! she started rehearsals for the Musical Droomvlucht, which had World-Premiere on the 09.10.2011. She currently works as a dance teacher in Sint-Niklaas.

== Stage credits ==
- Annie (Belgium)
- The Sound of Music (as Liesl, Belgium)
- Cats (as Sylvani, Antwerp)
- Cats (as Jemima/Victoria/Rumpleteazer/Swing, London)
- Carousel (as Louise, UK National Tour)
- A Little Night Music (as Fredrika, European Tour)
- Romeo en Julia: van Haat tot Liefde (as Julia, Belgium)
- Fiddler on the Roof (as Chava, Belgium)
- Alleen op de Wereld (as Adult Remi, European Tour)
- Dracula (Ensemble, Belgium)
- Mamma Mia! (Ensemble, Belgium)
- Cats (as Electra, European Tour)
- Les Misérables (Ensemble, The Netherlands)
- Droomvlucht (Ensemble)

== Video credits ==
- Cats (TV direct-to-video, as Jemima)
- Dracula (ensemble)
- Alleen op de Wereld（European Tour） (Adult Remi)

== Television credits ==
- Flikken (Elke De Brock) [Season 5, Episode 6: Sporen]
- De Wet volgens Milo (Sonja)
