= Raveena Mehta =

British-Belgian singer

- Born: 18 May 1997 (age 29); Antwerp, Belgium
- Citizenship: Belgium; United Kingdom
- Occupation: Singer–songwriter

YouTube information
- Channel: RaveenaMusic
- Years active: 2009–present
- Genre: Music
- Subscribers: 1 million
- Views: 63.7 million

Raveena Mehta (born 18 May 1997) is a British-Belgian singer-songwriter.

== Early life ==
Mehta was born and raised in Antwerp, Belgium in an Indian family. At the age of 11, she moved to Mumbai in 2008. There, Mehta continued her vocal training while attending the American School of Bombay. She later pursued a Foundation Diploma at Central Saint Martin's School of Art and Design before completing her undergraduate degree in Fine Arts from Goldsmiths, University of London. She trained in Western singing under vocal coach Kim Chandler and Indian classical singing with Suchita Parte.

== Career ==
At 12 years old, Mehta released her debut album, From Deep Within, in 2010. The album featured 13 tracks out of which 5 songs were released with music videos, which were aired on music channels like Vh1, SS Music, and Zee Trendz.

In 2020, Raveena released several songs, including "Yaadein" in collaboration with Avitesh Shrivastava, "Aaja Mere Naal" with Rishabh Kant, "Jab Tu Hai Wahi" with Rishi Rich, and "Keh Na Saku" with Rahul Jain. In 2021, she recorded an acoustic version of "Casanova" with Tiger Shroff. In 2023, Raveena released her single "Awara," produced by YSoBlue. Her music consists of Hindi, Punjabi, English, and Urdu dialects.

== Personal life ==
In 2022, Mehta married Saaket Mehta.

== Discography ==
- 2010 – Album: From Deep Within
- 2020 – Single: "Yaadein" – Raveena and Avitesh Shrivastava
- 2020 – Single: "Aaja Mere Naal" – Raveena and Rishabh Kant
- 2020 – Single: "Jab Tu Hai Wahi" – Raveena and Rishi Rich
- 2020 – Single: "I Want You" - Raveena, Rishabh Kant, and Asad
- 2020 – Single: "Keh Na Saku" (Official Female Version of Rahul Jain's Song)
- 2021 – Single: "Casanova Acoustic" - Tiger Shroff features Raveena Mehta
- 2021 – Single: "Tere Liye"
- 2021 – Single: "Moonlight"
- 2022 – Single: "Tujhse Milne Ki Aas"
- 2022 – Single: "Bewafaa"
- 2023 – Single: "Kho Jaun Main"
- 2023 – Single: "Sona Jeha Chehra"
- 2023 – Single: "Awara"
- 2024 – Single: "Na Ja"
- 2024 – Single: "Do It Right"

== Awards and honors ==
Since 2017, Mehta has been a regular guest at the Cannes Film Festival, where she has walked the red carpet and performed for designer Dimple Mehta. Her career was launched by Sridevi Kapoor when she was 12 years old, and in tribute to the late actress, Raveena wore a custom gown at the Cannes Film Festival to honor Sridevi's life and legacy.
