= Beautiful Ghosts =

2019 promotional single by Taylor Swift

Promotional single by Taylor Swift

from the album Cats: Highlights from the Motion Picture Soundtrack
- Released: November 15, 2019
- Recorded: 2019
- Genre: Orchestral
- Length: 4:21
- Label: Polydor
- Composers: Taylor Swift; Andrew Lloyd Webber
- Lyricist: Taylor Swift
- Producers: Greg Wells; Tom Hooper; Andrew Lloyd Webber

Lyric video
- "Beautiful Ghosts" on YouTube

"Beautiful Ghosts" (also subtitled "(From the Motion Picture Cats)") is a song by the American singer-songwriter Taylor Swift and the English composer Andrew Lloyd Webber from the 2019 Cats film adaptation, in which Swift played Bombalurina. The song was written by Swift (lyrics and music) and the Cats creator Lloyd Webber (music), and produced by Greg Wells, Lloyd Webber and the Cats director Tom Hooper. It was released on November 15, 2019. Considered as its signature song, it is performed in the film by the principal character Victoria, portrayed by Francesca Hayward. A 30-second reprise is also sung by Judi Dench as Old Deuteronomy. Swift performs the official single version that is played over the ending credits.

Upon release, the song received positive reviews from music critics. It received nominations for Best Original Song at the 77th Golden Globe Awards and Best Song Written for Visual Media at the 63rd Annual Grammy Awards—Swift's third nomination for the latter, following "Safe & Sound" (2011) and "I Don't Wanna Live Forever" (2016).

== Background and release ==
As a concept, the then-untitled song was first reported in early 2018, when the film adaptation was in early stages of production. The song was designed to provide a way for Victoria to introduce her character to the audience, as she communicates solely through gestures and dance in the original stage show. Swift described the song as such:

"Beautiful Ghosts" is sung from a young voice who is wondering if she will ever have glory days. Longing for the sense of belonging she sees everyone else finding. Reaching for it, desperately afraid of never having beautiful ghosts of days gone by to cling to in her older years.

The song was released on digital platforms and to streaming services on November 15, 2019, one month before the film's theatrical release. A lyric video for the song was released on YouTube the same day. The lyric video has over 8 million views on YouTube. In a 2021 interview, Lloyd Webber said writing "Beautiful Ghosts" with Swift was his "only enjoyable part" of working in Cats.

== Composition ==
The song has a running time of four minutes and twenty-one seconds. It is in the key of E, modulating from a minor key in the verses to a major key in the chorus with a vocal range spanning from G#_{3} to C#_{5}. It has a tempo of 60 beats per minute. The song is in a compound meter that changes between 6/8 and 9/8 throughout most of the song, with the ending in compound septuple meter 21/8. The orchestral ballad started as an acoustic melody composed by Lloyd Webber. During rehearsals in December 2018 at his London studio, he played Swift the melody on the piano and Swift immediately started improvising lyrics. According to Lloyd Webber, the two "wrote 90 percent of it pretty much over an afternoon." He described the collaboration with Swift as "a joy", the collaboration as "one of the finest of [his] 50-year career", Swift's lyrics as "brilliant", and her performance of the song as "emotional" and "among the very best [he's] ever had". Tom Hooper, director of the film and a producer of the song, complimented the "extraordinary beauty" of Swift's lyrics and praised Swift for her "profound understanding of what we're trying to do with the movie."

== Critical reception ==
In contrast to the negative reception Cats received, the song received positive reviews from music critics, who praised Swift's vocal performance. Darlene Aderoju and Joelle Goldstein of People described the song as "chillingly-beautiful" and a "haunting melody" that "speaks to a feeling of longing to be wanted and reminiscing on better memories." They also praised Swift's singing, describing it as "impressive pipes beyond her typical country-pop style", especially the final belted note. Writing for HuffPost, Ron Dicker complimented Swift's vocals, referring to the song as "hauntingly gorgeous" and an "absolute showstopper". Elite Daily's Jessica Bolaños opined that the song is "nothing short of perfection" and stated that the lyrics are "dripping with passion". Chris Willman of Variety wrote that the song is a return to the "youthful tonality" in Swift's voice, typical of "her Fearless days". Brittany Spanos and Ryan Reeds of Rolling Stone described the song as "cinematic" and "wistful". They also opined that the song "builds to a rousing climax with the singer's voice in a full roar". MTV's Madeline Roth praised Swift's vocal performance and labeled the final high note of the song as "more powerful than anything we've heard from T. Swift in recent memory". Carolyn Droke of Uproxx wrote that the song is about "the melancholy feeling that comes with reminiscing on old memories" and appreciated Swift for showing off her vocal range.

Others gave the song less favorable reviews. Adam Feldman wrote for Time Out that "Beautiful Ghosts" is "terrible", saying that "Swift's lyrics clank with banality at nearly every turn of phrase". Johnny Oleksinski of the New York Post agreed, calling the song "a boring 'Memory' copycat". Leah Marilla Thomas of Cosmopolitan praised the final chorus, but described the song as "a little bonkers", and said that listeners need to lower their expectations before listening. Various Vulture staff also criticized the song, describing the lyrics as nonsensical and corny; Swift's vocal performance was criticized, with Rebecca Alter summarizing the song as Swift "leaping for that note and falling off a cliff". In June 2022, Insider ranked "Beautiful Ghosts" as Swift's worst soundtrack song.

== Accolades ==
The song was nominated for Best Original Song at the 77th Golden Globe Awards, becoming Swift's third nomination in the category, following "Safe & Sound" (2013) and "Sweeter than Fiction" (2014). At the 63rd Annual Grammy Awards, "Beautiful Ghosts" was nominated for Best Song Written for Visual Media, marking Swift's third nomination in the category, following "Safe & Sound" (2011) and "I Don't Wanna Live Forever" (2016).

Year	Organization	Award	Result	Ref.
2020	Golden Globe Awards	Best Original Song	Nominated	
2020	Huading Awards	Best Global Film Theme Song	Nominated	
2021	Grammy Awards	Best Song Written for Visual Media	Nominated	

== Credits and personnel ==
Credits are adapted from Tidal.

- Taylor Swift – vocals, songwriter
- Andrew Lloyd Webber – producer, songwriter
- Greg Wells – producer
- Tom Hooper – producer
- Gus Pirelli – engineer, studio personnel
- Ryan Smith – mastering engineer, studio personnel
- Serban Ghenea – mixer, studio personnel
- John Ashton Thomas – conductor
- Everton Nelson – orchestra leader
- Susie Gillis – orchestra contractor
- Eliza Marshall, Helen Keen – alto flute, flute
- Anthony Pike – bass clarinet
- Jodi Milliner – bass guitar
- Andy Wood – bass trombone
- Adrian Bradbury, Caroline Dearnley, Chris Worsey, Frank Schaefer, Ian Burdge, Paul Kegg – cello
- John Carnac – clarinet
- Jane Marshall – cor anglais
- Allen Walley, Mary Scully, Richard Pryce, Steve Mair – double bass
- Alexei Watkins, Martin Owen, Richard Watkins, Simon Rayner – French horn
- Skaila Kanga – harp
- David Thomas – oboe
- Chris Baron, Frank Ricotti – percussion
- John Ashton Thomas, Peter Murray – piano
- Bill Lockhart – timpani
- Ed Tarrant, Mark Nightingale – trombone
- Dan Newell, Kate Moore, Pat White – trumpet
- Owen Slade – tuba
- Andy Parker, Gillianne Haddow, Gustav Clarkson, Jake Walker, Martin Humbey, Peter Lale, Polly Wiltshire, Sue Dench – viola
- Dai Emanuel, Dave Williams, Debbie Preece, Debbie Widdup, Emil Chakalov, Everton Nelson, Ian Humphries, Jonathan Evans-Jones, Julian Leaper, Kate Robinson, Laura Melhuish, Lorraine McAslan, Mark Berrow, Martyn Jackson, Miranda Dale, Natalia Bonner, Odile Ollagnon, Patrick Kiernan, Paul Willey, Ralph de Souza, Richard George, Rick Koster – violin

== Charts ==
Chart performance for "Beautiful Ghosts"
Chart (2019)	Peak position
Australia Digital Tracks (ARIA)	22
Canada Digital Song Sales (Billboard)	31
Greece Digital Songs (Billboard)	5
Hungary (Single Top 40)	26
New Zealand Hot Singles (RMNZ)	36
Scottish Singles Sales (Official Charts)	44
UK Singles Downloads (Official Charts)	32
US Digital Song Sales (Billboard)	14

== Release history ==
Release history and formats for "Beautiful Ghosts"
Country	Date	Format	Label	Ref.
Various	November 15, 2019	Digital download; streaming	Polydor	
