= Florentine Diamond =

Historic yellow diamond

Florentine
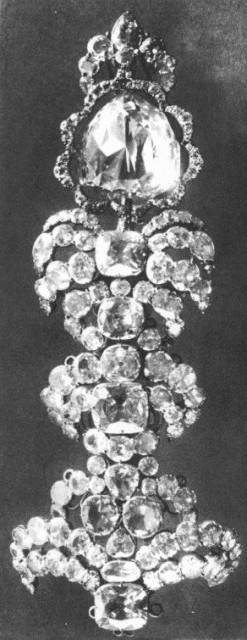
- Historical photograph of the diamond as part of an aigrette
- Weight: 137.27 carats (27.454 g)
- Color: Light yellow in colour with very slight green overtones
- Cut: Nine-sided 126-facet double rose cut
- Country of origin: India
- Owner: House of Habsburg-Lorraine

The Florentine Diamond is a large diamond, known for its long association with European royalty. A possession of the House of Habsburg-Lorraine since 1737, it was widely thought to have been lost in the aftermath of the fall of the Austro-Hungarian Empire in 1918, but was revealed in November 2025 to have remained with the family in secret.

Reportedly of Indian origin, the Florentine Diamond is light yellow in colour with very slight green overtones. It is cut in the form of an irregular (although very intricate) nine-sided 126-facet double rose cut, with a weight of 137.27 carats (27.454 g). The stone is also known as the Tuscan, the Tuscany Diamond, the Grand Duke of Tuscany, the Austrian Diamond, Austrian Yellow Diamond, and the Dufner Diamond.

== History ==
=== Origins and Habsburg acquisition ===
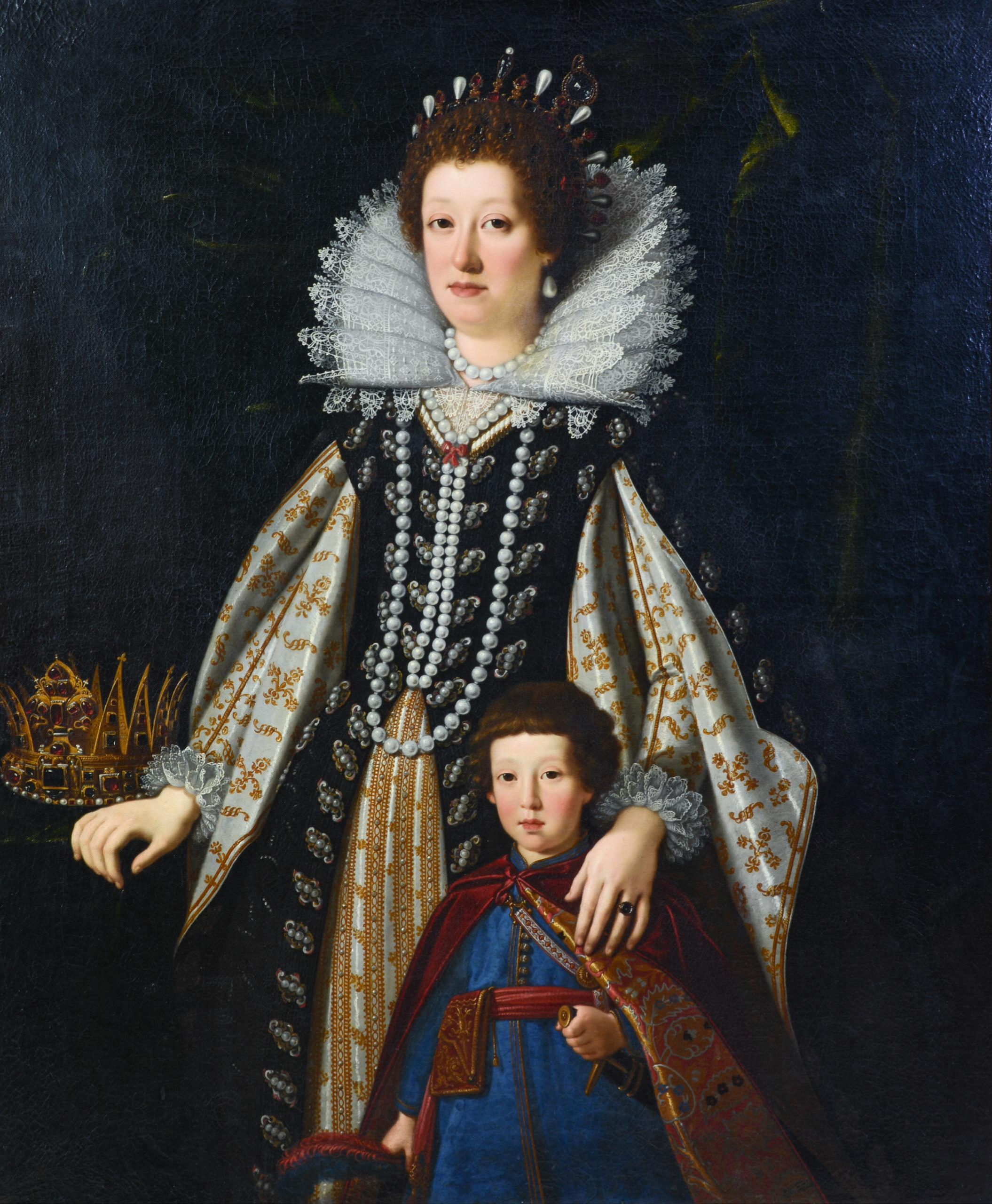
Portrait of Mary Magdalene of Austria with her son, wearing the Florentine on her head as a pendant

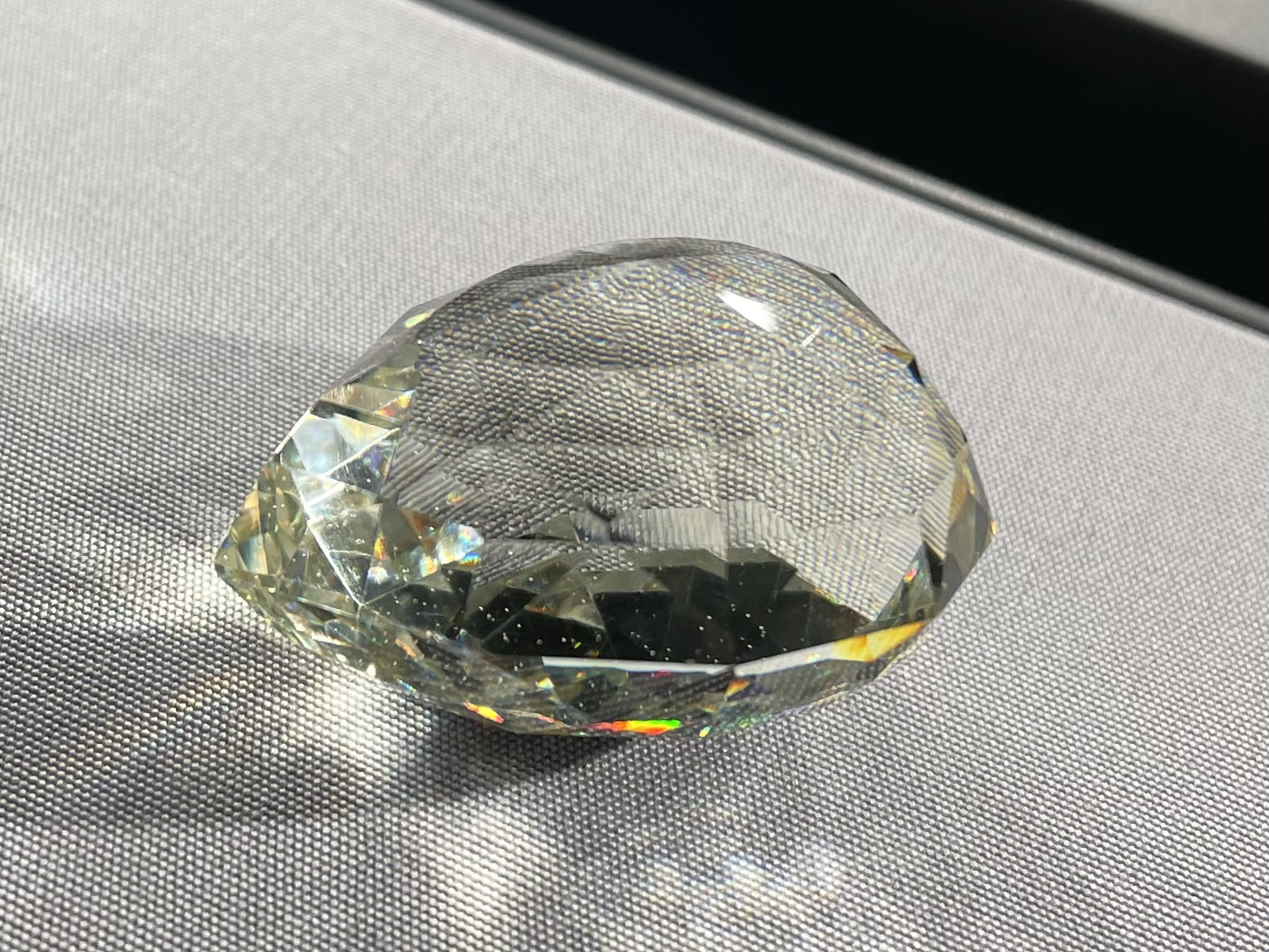
Historic rhinestone copy of the Florentine made in 1865, Natural History Museum, Vienna

The stone's origins are disputed. By one account, it was cut by Lodewyk van Bercken for Charles the Bold, Duke of Burgundy. Charles is said to have been wearing it when he fell in the Battle of Nancy on 5 January 1477. A peasant or foot soldier found the diamond on the Duke's person and sold it for 2 francs, thinking it was glass. The new owner Bartholomew May, a citizen of Bern, sold it to the Genoese, who in turn sold it to Ludovico Sforza. By way of the Fuggers, it came into the Medici treasury at Florence. Pope Julius II is also named as one of its owners.

Another version of the stone's early history claims that the rough stone was acquired in the late 16th century from the King of Vijayanagar in southern India by the Portuguese Governor of Goa, D. Luis de Castro, Count of Monsanto. The crystal was deposited with the Jesuits in Rome until, after lengthy negotiations, Ferdinando I de' Medici, Grand Duke of Tuscany succeeded in buying it from the Castro-Noronha family for 35,000 Portuguese scudi crocati. Duke Ferdinand's son, Cosimo II, finally entrusted his father's purchase to Pompeo Studentoli, a Venetian cutter working in Florence. The finished gem was delivered on 10 October 1615. An inventory drawn up on Cosimo's death confirms the acquisition of the rough diamond by Ferdinand and describes the gem as 'faceted on both sides and encircled by a diamond encrusted band'.

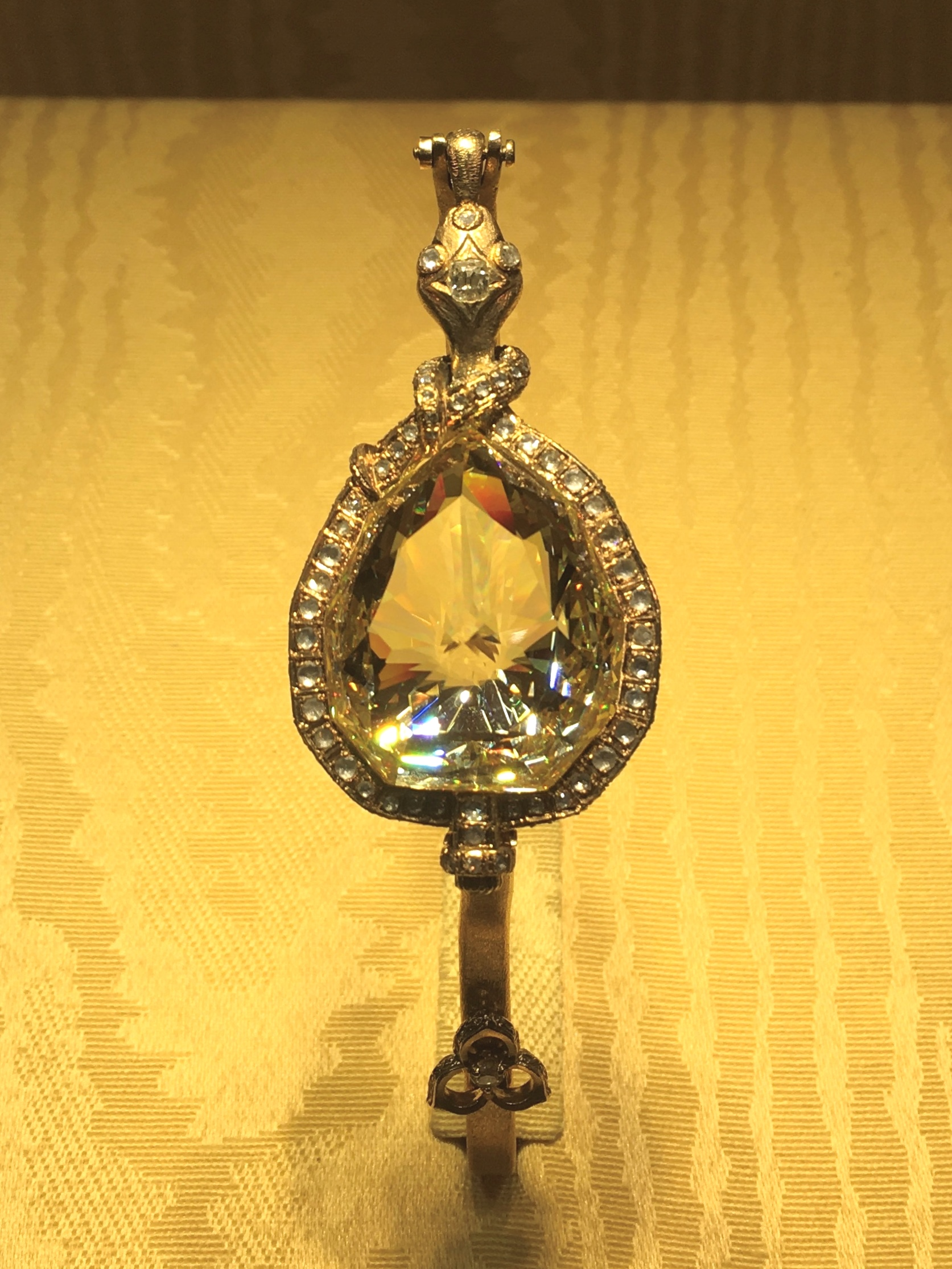
Replica of the Florentine, set in a piece as it originally appeared in the 16th-17th century

Documented history begins when Jean Baptiste Tavernier, the French jeweller and traveller, saw the stone among the possessions of Ferdinando II de' Medici, Grand Duke of Tuscany in 1657. It then passed into the hands of the Habsburgs when the last of the Medicis died in 1737, as a result of the marriage of Francis III Stephan of Lorraine to Empress Maria Theresa of Austria, and was placed with the Austrian Crown Jewels in the Imperial Treasury inside the Hofburg palace in Vienna.

The diamond was set in a hat aigrette and displayed together with other crown jewels in the Imperial Treasury in display case XIII. In 1865, the diamond's weight and specificities were properly documented by Dr. Moritz Hoernes, head of the Imperial and Royal Court Mineral Cabinet. A plaster cast was also made. A rhinestone model was made at L. Saemann in Paris, with great care taken that the colour tone of the glass replica corresponded as closely as possible to the original stone. The colour of the Florentine was described as "wine mixed tenfold with water". This historic copy is kept at the Natural History Museum, Vienna.

=== Century of secrecy ===
With the fall of the Austro-Hungarian Empire after the First World War, the stone was removed from the Imperial Treasury by order of Emperor Charles I of Austria and taken by him to Switzerland. Following Charles' death, it remained in possession of his widow Empress Zita. Despite this, there was public speculation that the Florentine Diamond had gone missing as early as 1921. The Kingdom of Italy attempted to claim ownership of the Florentine under the terms of the Treaty of Saint-Germain-en-Laye, on the basis of its having come into Habsburg hands via the Grand Duchy of Tuscany. This claim was rejected by the Inter-Allied Reparation Commission in 1923, which found that the diamond was the private property of the Habsburgs. With the onset of the Second World War, Empress Zita relocated her family to Canada, taking the diamond with them. She ultimately returned to Europe in 1953, but chose to leave the diamond stored in a safe deposit box in a Quebec bank. The Empress expressed a desire that the diamond's existence should remain a secret for at least a century following the 1922 death of the Emperor Charles, and after her own death in 1989 knowledge of its status was confined to her sons Archduke Robert and Archduke Rudolf, and their sons in turn.

In this period, various theories were proposed as to the fate of the Florentine, including that it had been sold by the Habsburgs and cut into multiple smaller diamonds. Its apparent mysterious disappearance became the subject of a number of works of fiction. The Florentine jeweller Paolo Penko recreated the diamond with cubic zirconia in a set as it appeared based on historical records and description when Archduchess Maria Maddalena of Austria (1589–1631) wore it. This copy is exhibited at the Palazzo Medici-Riccardi in Florence.

The Florentine's continued existence was revealed to the public in November 2025. The safety deposit box was opened by Empress Zita's descendants, her grandsons Simeon von Habsburg-Lothringen, Lorenz von Habsburg-Lothringen and Karl von Habsburg-Lothringen, in the presence of journalists from The New York Times. Also present was the jeweler Christoph Köchert of the Austrian jewelry firm A.E. Köchert, who attested its authenticity. The Habsburgs indicated that they planned to have the diamond exhibited in a Canadian museum, in recognition of the country's providing refuge to the Empress and her family in wartime. Quebec Culture Minister Mathieu Lacombe called it "a truly unique story that connects Quebec to the Habsburg family," stating that they were "working with the Quebec National Museum of Fine Arts to find a way for these jewels to be displayed and accessible to the public." In September 2026, the jewels were put on display as part of a public exhibition.

The Austrian government is awaiting the results of a commission to determine whether the jewels, including the diamond, belong to Empress Zita's descendants as family heirlooms or to Austria. As of September 2026, the jewels are in a Canadian trust with Andrew Molson as its trustee. British historian Richard Bassett studied the provenance of the jewels at the request of the family, and is of the opinion that they belong to the Hapsburg family.

== In fiction ==
The Florentine Diamond plays a role in Dan Hanel's 2015 novel In The Shadow of Diablo: Death at the Healing Waters, Amy Meyerson's 2020 novel The Imperfects, Justin B. Hodder's 2021 novel The Mists of Morne, as well as the 2022 novel Der rote Diamant (The Red Diamond) by Thomas Hürlimann.

The 2014 French film Le Dernier Diamant, directed Éric Barbier, concerns a fictional attempt to steal the Florentine Diamond, which was at the time still considered to be missing.

== See also ==
- List of diamonds
