= Victoria the White Cat =

Principal character in Cats

- Cats character
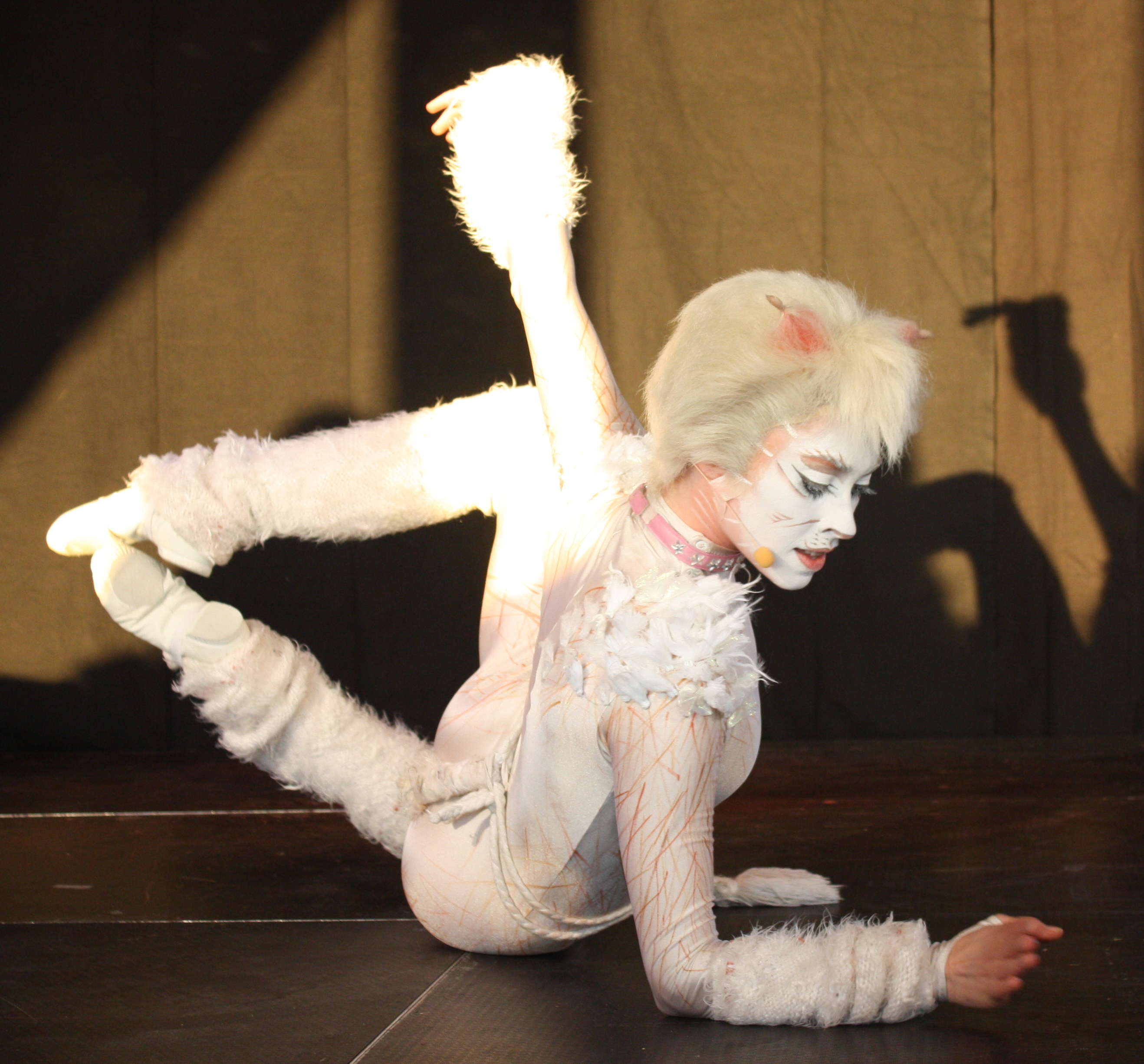
- Victoria, from a promotional event in Germany in 2011.
- First appearance: Cats (1981)
- Created by: Andrew Lloyd Webber
- Based on: Old Possum's Book of Practical Cats by T. S. Eliot

Victoria the White Cat is a principal character in the 1981 musical Cats, written by Andrew Lloyd Webber based on T. S. Eliot's 1939 Old Possum's Book of Practical Cats. Primarily a dance role with no solo singing parts, the role demands extensive ballet training and a high degree of flexibility. The character is featured in a ballet solo ("White Cat Solo") as well as a pas de deux in the musical, and leads most of the ensemble dance routines.

The role was originated by Finola Hughes in the West End in 1981, and by Cynthia Onrubia on Broadway in 1982.

In the 2019 movie adaptation, the role is played by Francesca Hayward. Unlike her stage counterpart, this version is made the de facto protagonist of the film and has more of a singing role. She performs the film's sole new song "Beautiful Ghosts" as her signature song, as well as taking over Jemima's part in "Memory".

Victoria also appears in Andrew Lloyd Webber's 2001 Beijing concert as a white silhouette.

== Character description ==
Within the Jellicle tribe, Victoria is a naive and shy white kitten who is known for her beauty and poise. She is a very quiet cat and has no solo singing parts; however, she is frequently spotlighted as a dancer and opens with a ballet solo near the beginning of the musical. Dance Magazine described her "iconic" solo as "filled with endless développés punctuated by twitches and swerves, ending in a Pilates-teaser–like seat." According to Cats choreographer Gillian Lynne, the "White Cat Solo" represents the character's coming of age.

After her solo, Victoria's dancing continues to feature heavily throughout the show; she leads most of the group numbers and takes part in a ceremonial mating dance (pas de deux) with Plato. At the end of the musical, Victoria becomes the second cat — after Jemima — to fully accept the outcast Grizabella, which leads to Grizabella's re-acceptance by the Jellicles and ascension to the Heaviside Layer.

== Appearance ==
Victoria is known for her distinct white coat, which stands out among the multi-coloured markings of the other cats. Her white coat is meant to symbolise the character's innocence. Although her costume is designed to give the impression of a pure-white cat, due to the limitations of stage lighting (a pure white costume would wash out all costume details under stage lighting), she has light gold, tan, or grey markings on her costume. Her distinct appearance also makes her a frequent subject for advertising for the musical. She also wears a pink bejeweled collar around her neck in the stage musical.

== Notable casting ==
The role of Victoria was originated by Finola Hughes in the original West End production in 1981, and by Cynthia Onrubia in the original Broadway production in 1982. The character was played by Georgina Pazcoguin in the 2016 Broadway revival and Baby Byrne in the 2024 Off-Broadway revival. On screen, Phyllida Crowley Smith portrayed Victoria in the 1998 filmed version of the musical, and Francesca Hayward portrayed the character in the 2019 film adaptation.
