= Lucas Adriaens =

Flemish painter

Lucas Adriaens (or Adriaennsson), a native of Antwerp, was admitted into the Guild of St. Luke in 1459, and five times held the post of dean to the society. He co-operated in the celebrated 'Entremets' at Bruges in 1468. Among the works attributed to Adriaens are "fourteen celebrated historical glass pieces" of Tournai Cathedral at Tournai, Belgium. He died about 1493.
