= Lazare Kaplan International =

American diamond company

Lazare Kaplan International (LKI) is a diamond manufacturing and distribution company based in New York City. The Chairman of the Board of Directors was Maurice Tempelsman. The first LKI was located in Ponce, Puerto Rico, at el Barrio de los Diamantes, a community named after the factory was located there. LKI was founded in 1903 where it operated until it was moved to Caguas, Puerto Rico in the 1970s.

== Business activities ==
LKI's main business activity is cutting and polishing "ideal-cut" and "fine make" diamonds, which it sells to upscale retail jewelers throughout the world. Some of these diamonds are distributed loose while others are set in jewelry under the Lazare Diamond brand. LKI distributes its products through over 1,500 retail partners and customers in 29 countries.

Although primarily based in the United States, LKI also has sales offices in Belgium, Japan, China and Hong Kong. LKI has operated in Japan since 1973, Southeast Asia since 1987 and Latin America since 1997.

LKI's first factory was located in Ponce, Puerto Rico. It became the largest diamond cutting and polishing factory in the United States. The company also has manufacturing operations in other parts of the world. It established a joint manufacturing partnership with Alrosa (the Russian government-owned mining company), with cutting facilities in Moscow and Barnaul. In addition, it has contract manufacturing operations in China and Thailand. In Africa, LKI has manufacturing facilities in Botswana and a joint manufacturing and technical services agreement with NamGem Diamond Manufacturing Company (Pty) Ltd in Namibia.

== Company history ==
LKI was founded in 1903 by Mr Lazare Kaplan. The Tempelsman Group purchased a controlling interest in LKI in 1984. LKI has been publicly listed since 1972 and remains the only company specialising in diamond manufacturing whose shares are publicly listed on a US stock exchange (American Stock Exchange; stock symbol: LKI). It has been a Diamond Trading Company (DTC) Sightholder since 1946. In 1985, it became the first company to launch a branded diamond (the Lazare Diamond).

== Technical innovation ==
In 1919, Lazare Kaplan's cousin, mathematician Marcel Tolkowsky, first published the mathematical formula for diamonds cut to "ideal" proportions, a formula designed to optimise the brilliance, fire and sparkle in a polished diamond. In the same year, LKI became the first commercial-scale operation to cut its diamonds to ideal proportions. In 1957, LKI developed the modern oval cut, and in 1983 it developed and patented the laser inscription process. In 2002, LKI was awarded a patent, jointly with the General Electric Company, for the high-pressure high-temperature (HPHT) process for improving the color of certain all-natural diamond types. In addition, LKI has secured numerous patents on diamond setting techniques and innovations in displays for loose polished stones and jewelry.

== Missing diamonds and litigation ==
On May 17, 2010, Lazare Kaplan sued various Lloyd's of London syndicates and European insurers for $640 million in damages arising from the disappearance of diamonds. The lawsuit alleges that the insurers breached two "all risk" New York property insurance policies.

In 2011, Lazare filed a US$1.5 billion Racketeer Influenced and Corrupt Organizations Act (RICO) complaint in the US against KBC Bank, the largest bank in Belgium, after defaulting on a $45 million loan from KBC in a case about an alleged conspiracy to steal diamonds and money. According to KBC Bank's lawyers, Lazare chairman Maurice Tempelsman was involved, as was Erez Daleyot, described as "a notorious diamond dealer who once controlled a third of all trade in diamonds". In 2019, KBC won a motion to dismiss the US case, considered to be a major win for the bank. Litigation in Belgium between KBC and Lazare continued.

A summary of the complex case involving LKI and KBC Bank was included in a 2020 KBC Base Prospectus, up to proceedings pending before the Belgian Court of Cassation initiated by LKI on 2 April 2019. After ten years of litigation the Company Court of Antwerp, section Antwerp had not been able to decide on the merits of the case.

LKI has been suspended from trading on the American Stock Exchange since September 2009 and has not filed quarterly or annual reports with the U.S. Securities and Exchange Commission (SEC) since early 2009.
