= Jemima (cat) =

Main character in the musical "Cats"

Veerle Casteleyn as Jemima in the 1998 Cats film

Jemima (also known as Sillabub) is a principal character in the musical Cats, written by Andrew Lloyd Webber based on the poetry of T. S. Eliot. The youngest member of the Jellicle cats, she is idealistic and very accepting of others. She becomes the first cat to accept the outcast Grizabella back into the tribe.

The role was originated in the West End by Sarah Brightman in 1981, and on Broadway by Whitney Kershaw in 1982. Veerle Casteleyn played Jemima in the 1998 film adaptation with Helen Massey providing the character's singing voice. Jonadette Carpio portrayed the role (as "Syllabub") in the 2019 film adaptation.

== Character ==
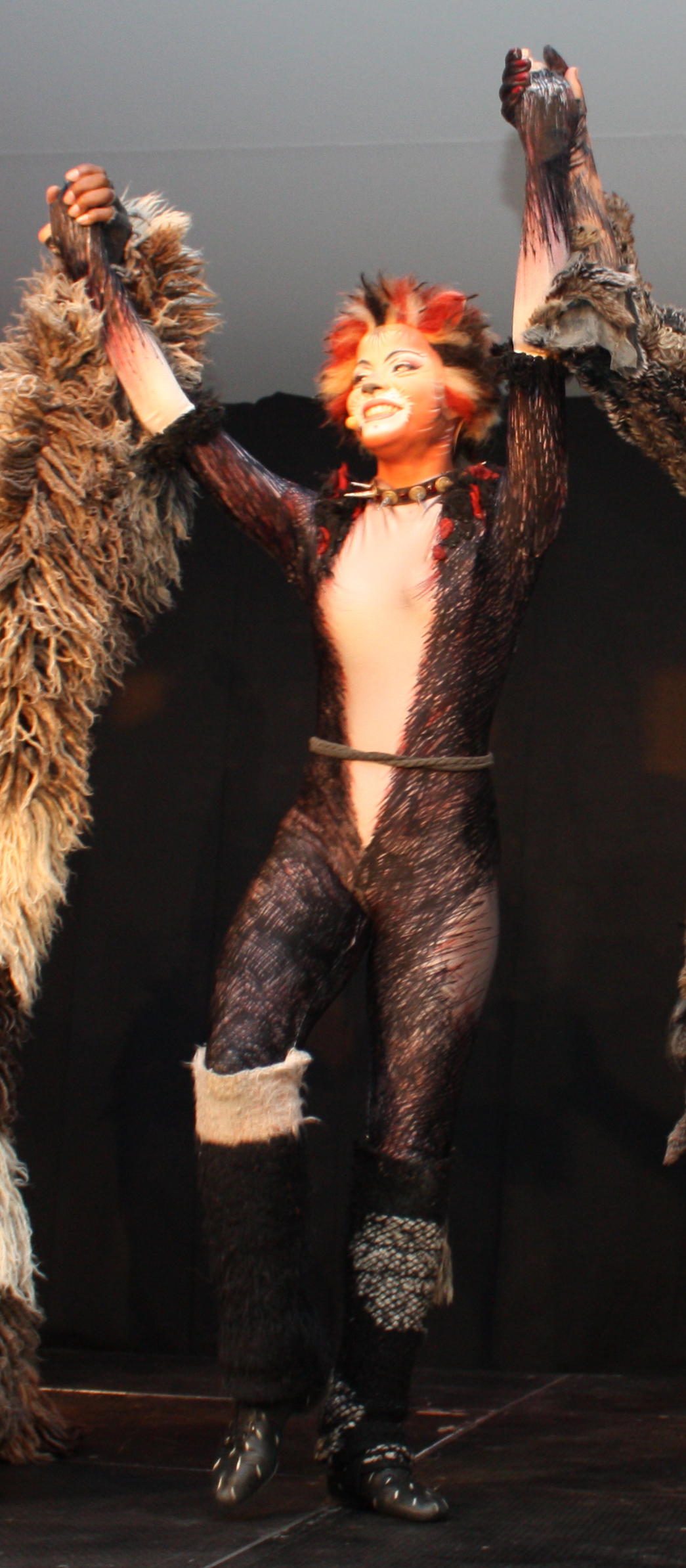
Jemima, from a promotional event in Germany in 2011

The youngest kitten of her tribe, Jemima is idealistic and accepting. She serves as a juxtaposition to the older Grizabella. Unlike the other cats, Jemima is receptive to Grizabella when they first meet. She is sympathetic to the older cat's plea for acceptance, and when Grizabella collapses while singing "Memory" towards the end of the musical, Jemima joins in briefly to encourage her to press on.

While "Memory" is sung primarily by Grizabella, melodic preludes are performed twice in a higher D major key by Jemima. The first instance occurs at the beginning of the second act after "The Moments of Happiness", and the second instance occurs near the end of the second act right before Grizabella's final appearance.

Vocally, Jemima is meant to have a pure and youthful-sounding soprano head voice.

=== Appearance ===
Jemima is a tiny kitten with a short wig and a spiked collar. Her coat is a rich satin red with black, brown and white tinges and a white chest. Her gloves/leg warmers are black and white, and the actress portraying her often has large eyes to make the character seem more innocent. When the show was reworked in 2014, her wig colours were changed from red and black to a less blocky, scruffy brown.

== Sillabub ==
When the show transferred from London to Broadway, the name "Jemima" was believed to carry negative racial connotations in the United States through its association with Aunt Jemima. The character was renamed using another of T. S. Eliot's Jellicle names, "Sillabub" (a portmanteau of "silly" and "Beelzebub"). The name "Sillabub" has since been used by other productions such as the Australian ones. In the long-running Japanese production by the Shiki Theatre Company, Jemima and Sillabub are two separate characters. Sillabub would eventually be used as Jemima's name in the 2019 film adaptation.

== Notable casting ==
The role of Jemima was originated by Sarah Brightman in the original West End production in 1981. Whitney Kershaw originated the role (as "Sillabub") on Broadway in 1982. Other notable performers include Anita Louise Combe in the 1985 Sydney production, and Ruthie Henshall as a replacement actor in the original London production in 1988. Arianna Rosario played Sillabub in the Broadway revival from July 2016 to June 2017, after which the role was taken over by Jessica Cohen.

On screen, Veerle Casteleyn played Jemima in the 1998 film adaptation with Helen Massey providing the character's singing voice. Jonadette Carpio portrays the role (as "Syllabub") in the 2019 film.
