= Scaif =

Rotating disk for polishing diamonds

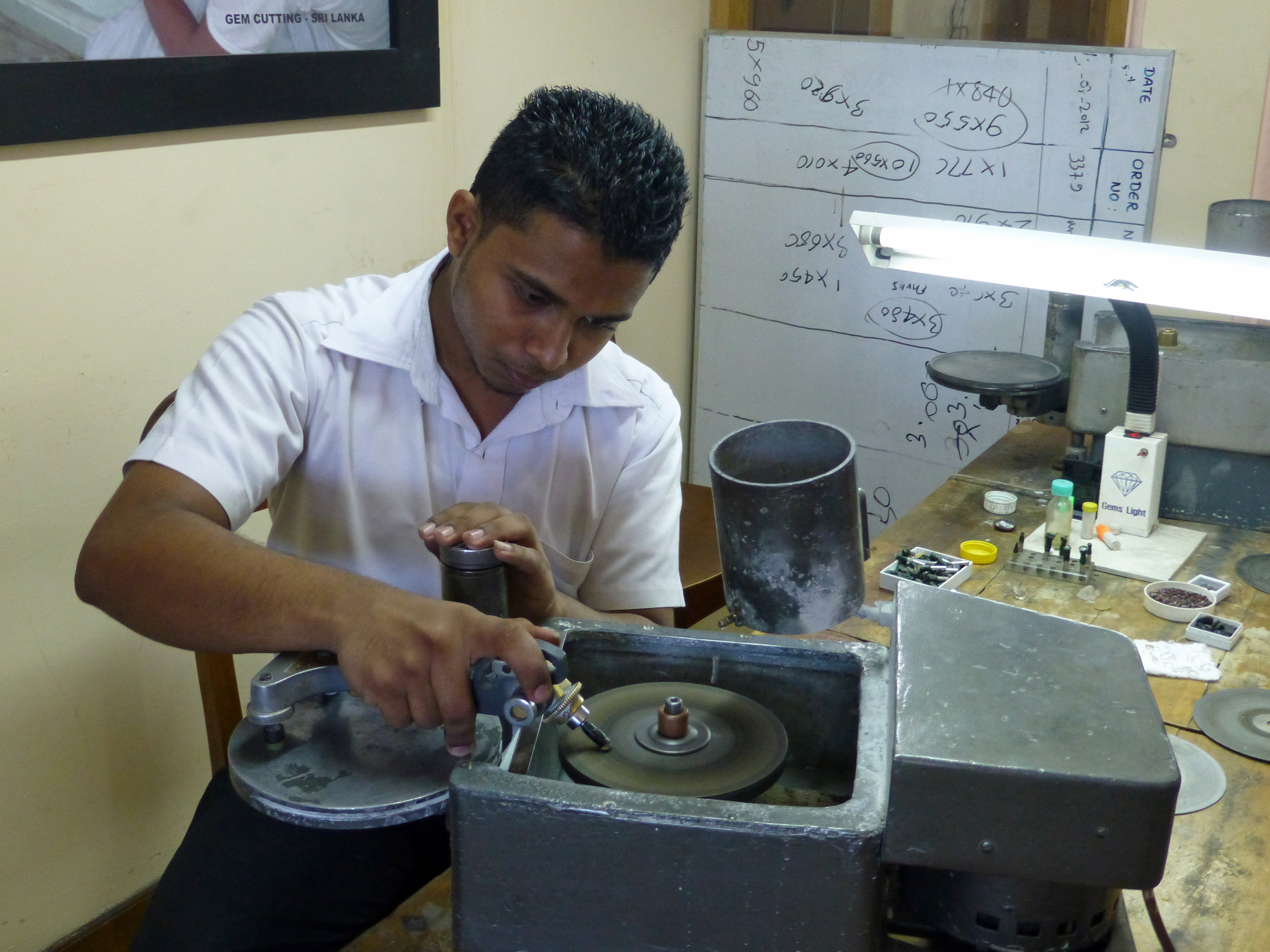
A man holding an arm piece with a stone over the scaif.

A scaif is a polishing wheel infused with a mixture of olive oil and diamond dust used in the diamond cutting industry. It was invented in the late 15th century by Lodewyk van Bercken in Antwerp.

With the scaif, it became possible to both polish and cut facets of the diamond symmetrically and with great precision, also allowing for more complex cuts to be made. This invention revolutionized the diamond cutting industry and, correspondingly, greatly increased the popularity of diamonds.

The scaif consists of a hard disk, parallel to the floor. The disk looks like and is rotated in the same way as a potter's wheel. On the top surface a film of olive oil and diamond dust is placed. Surrounding the disk is a circular frame to catch the oil that is spun off as the disk is rotated.

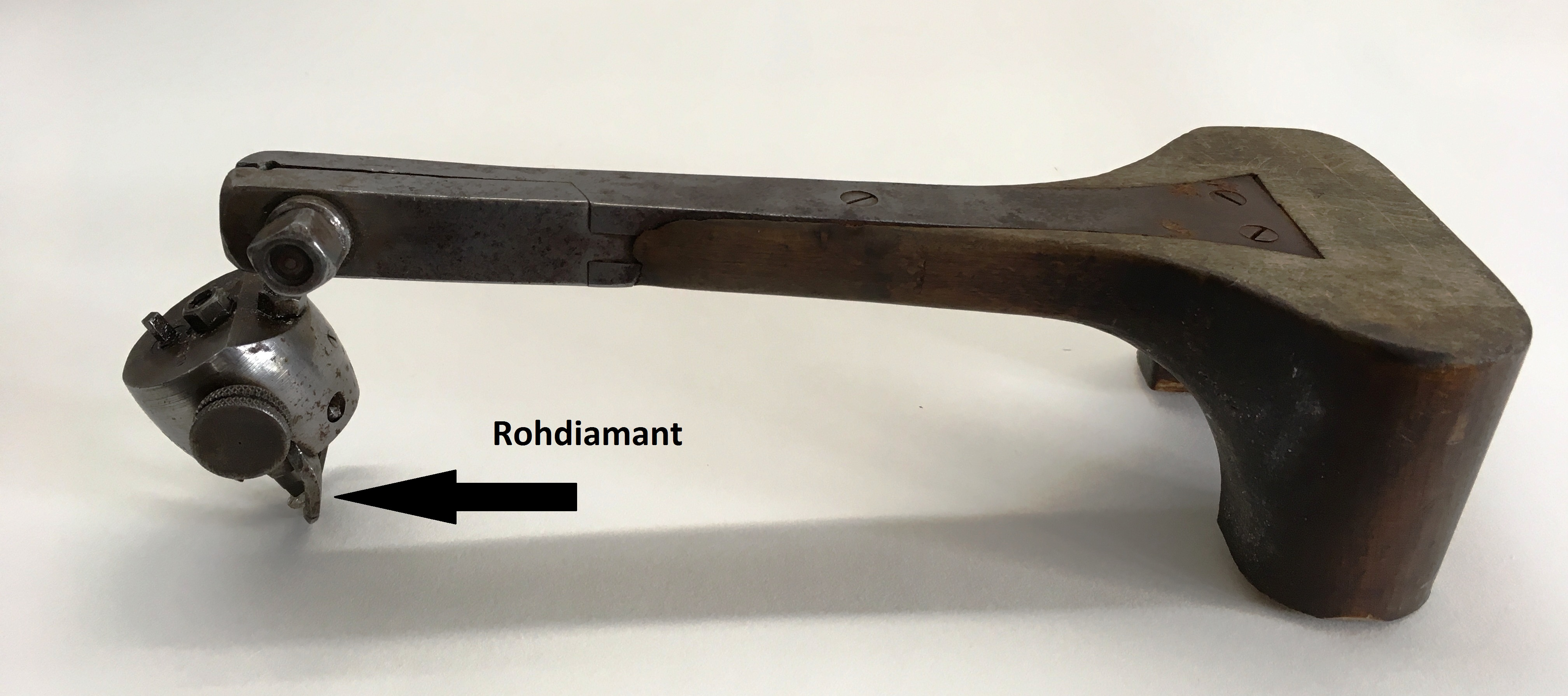
An older model of the arm piece for the stone.

Hovering just above the surface of the disk is a mechanical arm to hold the diamond. It can be finely adjusted, to move the diamond into the exact position needed for polishing the facets. As the facets are polished more diamond dust is produced, replenishing the supply.

== See also ==
- Faceting machine
