= Francesca Hayward =

English actress and ballerina (born 1992)

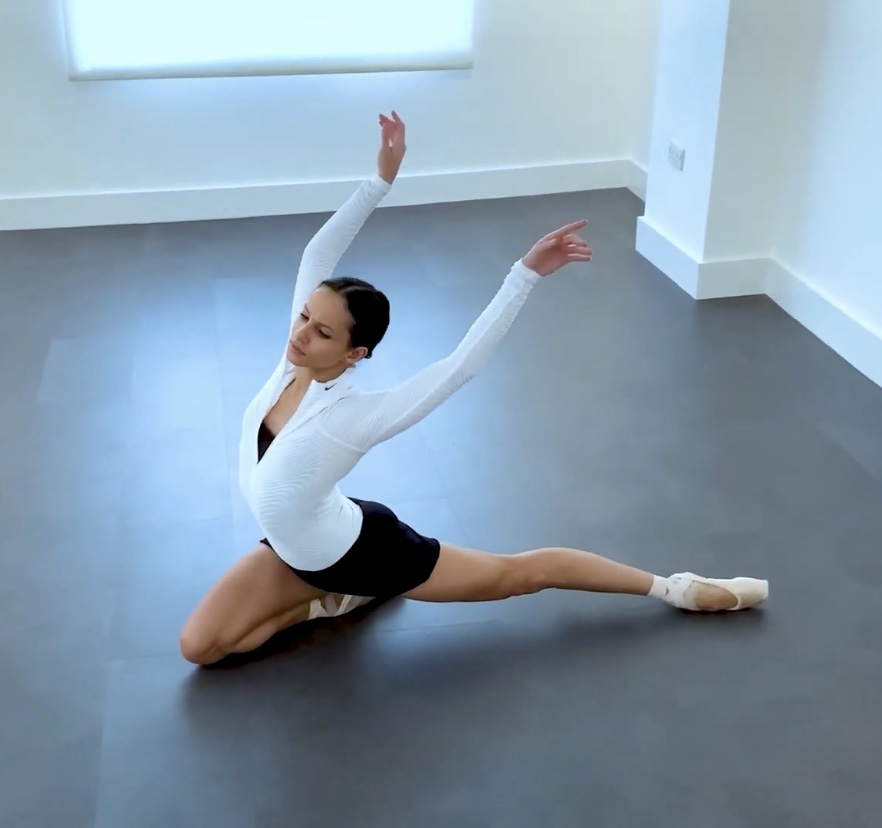
- Hayward in 2020
- Born: Francesca May Hayward; 4 July 1992 (age 34); Nairobi, Kenya
- Education: Royal Ballet School
- Occupations: Ballerina; actress
- Height: 5 ft 2 in (157 cm)
- Career
- Current group: The Royal Ballet

Francesca May Hayward (born 4 July 1992) is a Kenyan-born English ballerina and actress. She is a principal dancer in the Royal Ballet at Covent Garden in London. In 2019, she starred as Victoria the White Cat in the musical film Cats, an adaptation of the stage musical of the same name.

== Early life ==
Hayward was born in July 1992 in Nairobi, Kenya, the daughter of an English father and a Kenyan mother. At the age of two, she moved to the Goring-by-Sea suburb of Worthing in West Sussex to live with her grandparents. She started ballet at age 3, after her grandparents bought her a video of The Nutcracker. When she was young, she danced at Le Serve School of Ballet and Theatre Dance in Worthing until her teacher encouraged her to audition to White Lodge, the junior section of the Royal Ballet School. After being a Junior Associate from the age of nine, she entered the School at the age of 11 in 2003, and progressed to the Royal Ballet Upper School in 2008. According to Hayward, due to an injury, she did not officially graduate, but received a certificate of attendance.

== Career ==
During her training, Hayward was recognised as an exceptionally gifted dancer and after joining the Royal Ballet in 2010, was increasingly cast in more prominent roles during major productions. She was promoted to First Artist in 2013, Soloist in 2014, First Soloist in 2015 and Principal in 2016. Hayward's talent and technique have received critical praise and acclaim.

In 2012, Hayward danced a pas de deux from The Flower Festival in Genzano with fellow Royal Ballet dancer James Hay at the Erik Bruhn Competition in Canada. She danced Clara for the first time in The Nutcracker at Covent Garden in 2012.

Hayward was featured in the BBC documentary film Dancing the Nutcracker: Inside the Royal Ballet, Her performance as Clara in Sir Peter Wright's production of The Nutcracker and in Woolf Works was recorded for DVD by Opus Arte, and the latter was also broadcast on BBC.

In November 2018, Hayward joined the cast of Cats. She played the role of Victoria in the film directed by Tom Hooper, as well as singing the song "Beautiful Ghosts" written by Taylor Swift and Andrew Lloyd Webber. To allow her participation, Hayward took a temporary leave of absence from The Royal Ballet until the conclusion of filming. She returned to performing with The Royal Ballet in May 2019, dancing alongside Cesar Corrales in his ROH debut in Romeo and Juliet.

In 2020, Hayward's debut as Odette/Odile in Swan Lake was delayed due to the coronavirus pandemic. She participated in Misty Copeland's fundraiser, Swans for Relief, by dancing The Swan, in light of the pandemic's impact on the dance community. The fund will go to participating dancers' companies and other related relief funds. In Royal Opera House's first performance since the lockdown, which was live-streamed on YouTube, Hayward danced a new piece choreographed by Wayne McGregor alongside Corrales. That year also saw the release of Audrey, a documentary film about the life of British actress and humanitarian Audrey Hepburn in which Hayward played Audrey during her Hollywood years in danced-based "portraits" of Hepburn through her and fellow ballerinas Keira Moore and Alessandra Ferri.

Hayward performed at the Coronation Concert in 2023, to mark the coronation of Charles III and Camilla.

== Personal life ==
As of 2016, Hayward was living in Stoke Newington in North London.

== Repertoire ==
Ballet	(Principal) Choreographer	Role, Debut Date and Reference
The Nutcracker	Sir Peter Wright (after Lev Ivanov)	Clara (December 2012)
A Month in the Country	Sir Frederick Ashton	Vera (June 2013)
Manon	Sir Kenneth MacMillan	Manon (October 2014)
Alice's Adventures in Wonderland	Christopher Wheeldon	Alice (December 2014)
Romeo and Juliet	Sir Kenneth MacMIllan	Juliet (October 2015)
Rhapsody	Sir Frederick Ashton	Lead Female Principal (January 2016)
The Winter's Tale	Christopher Wheeldon	Perdita (April 2016)
The Invitation	Sir Kenneth MacMillan	The Girl (May 2016)
Frankenstein	Liam Scarlett	Justine (May 2016)
La Fille Mal Gardée	Sir Frederick Ashton	Lise (October 2016)
The Nutcracker	Sir Peter Wright (after Lev Ivanov)	The Sugar Plum Fairy (December 2016)
The Sleeping Beauty	Marius Petipa	Aurora (February 2017)
Mayerling	Sir Kenneth MacMillan	Princess Stephanie (May 2017)
Tarantella	George Balanchine	The Girl (May 2017)
The Dream	Sir Frederick Ashton	Titania (June 2017)
Giselle	Sir Peter Wright	Giselle (February 2018)
Coppelia	Dame Ninette de Valois (after Lev Ivanov and Enrico Cecchetti)	Swanilda (November 2019)
Onegin	John Cranko	Olga (January 2020)

Hayward has also danced as Princess Florine The Sleeping Beauty, Rose Fairy in The Nutcracker, and roles in Infra, Ballo della Regina, Symphony in C, and Within the Golden Hour, and in Robert Binet's immersive work, The Dreamers Ever Leave You (in collaboration with the National Ballet of Canada).

=== Created roles ===
Ballet	Choreographer	Date and Reference
Woolf Works	Wayne McGregor	May 2015
Multiverse	Wayne McGregor	November 2016
Morgen	Wayne McGregor	June 2020
Like Water for Chocolate (ballet)	Christopher Wheeldon	June 2022

== Filmography ==
Year	Title	Role	Notes
2016	Dancing the Nutcracker: Inside the Royal Ballet	Herself	BBC documentary film
2017	The Sun Is God	Francesca	Short film
2019	Romeo and Juliet: Beyond Words	Juliet	
2019	Cats	Victoria	
2020	Audrey	Audrey Hepburn	

== Awards and honours ==
As a student at The Royal Ballet School, Hayward won the 2009 Lynn Seymour Award for Expressive Dance and the 2010 Young British Dancer of the Year Award. She was also awarded the silver medal and Audience Choice Award at the 2010 Genee International Ballet Competition. Hayward won the Best Emerging Artist in 2014 and the Grishko Award for Best Female Dancer in 2016 at the Critics Circle National Dance Awards.

She was one of fifteen women selected to appear on the cover of the September 2019 issue of British Vogue, by guest editor Meghan Markle.

In 2020, Hayward was recognised as one of the United Kingdom's most influential people of African or African Caribbean heritage by being included in the 2021 edition of the annual Powerlist.
