= Maurice Tempelsman =

American businessman (1929–2025)

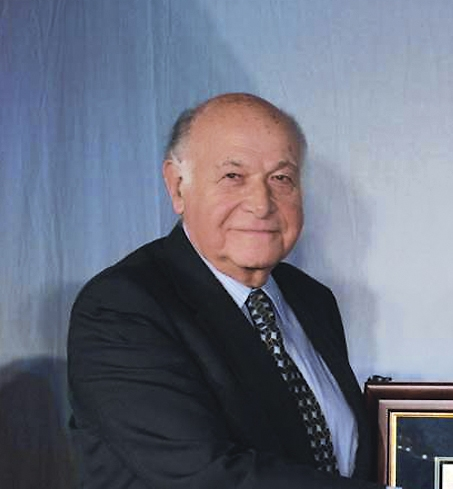
- Tempelsman in 2012
- Born: August 26, 1929; Antwerp, Belgium
- Died: August 23, 2025 (aged 95); New York City, U.S.
- Education: New York University
- Occupations: Businessman; merchant; diamond magnate
- Known for: Founder, Tempelsman Group; Chairman, Lazare Kaplan Intl
- Spouse: Lilly Bucholz (m. 1949; died 2022) (Note: Bucholz and Tempelsman separated in 1984, but were never legally divorced.)
- Partner: Jacqueline Kennedy Onassis (1980–1994; her death)
- Children: 3

Maurice Tempelsman (August 26, 1929 – August 23, 2025) was a Belgian-American businessman, diamond magnate and merchant. He was the longtime companion of Jacqueline Kennedy Onassis, a former first lady of the United States.

== Early life ==
Maurice Tempelsman was born on August 26, 1929, in Antwerp, Belgium, the son of Leon and Helene Tempelsman, both Orthodox Jews. he was raised in a Yiddish-speaking family in Antwerp's Jewish community. In 1940, Tempelsman and his family emigrated to the United States as Nazi Germany invaded Belgium. When he was 16, Tempelsman began working for his father, a diamond broker. He attended New York City's public schools and New York University.

== Business interests ==
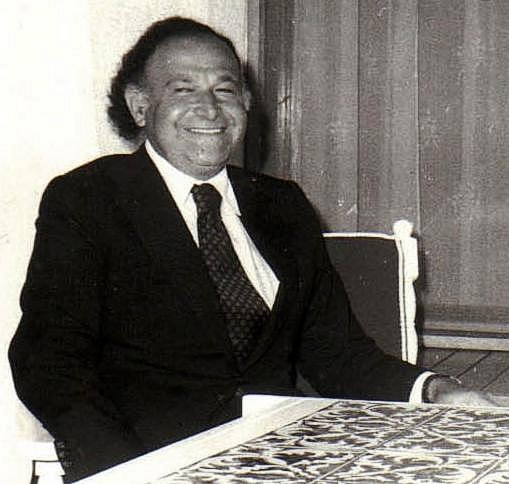
Maurice Tempelsman sitting at a table with Nicolae Ceausescu (not in this detail of the photo) in Romania July 1974.

He was also a general partner of Leon Tempelsman & Son, an investment company specializing in real estate and venture capital.

In 1950, Tempelsman created a new marketing niche by persuading the U.S. government to stockpile African diamonds for industrial and military purposes, with himself as the middleman. In 1957, at the age of 27, he and his lawyer, Adlai Stevenson, traveled to Africa, where Tempelsman had begun forging ties with leaders. His contacts eventually ranged from South African anti-apartheid politician Oliver Tambo to Zaire's kleptocratic dictator, Mobutu Sese Seko, and the influential Oppenheimer diamond family. Declassified memos and cables between former U.S. presidents and State Department officials from the 1950s to the 1990s have named Tempelsman as having direct input in the destabilization of Congo, Sierra Leone, Angola, Zimbabwe, Namibia, Rwanda, and Ghana. He was involved in the overthrow of Ghana's first elected president, Kwame Nkrumah, the CIA-backed assassination of Congo's first-elected prime minister, Patrice Lumumba, and the cover-up of CIA covert support for Mobutu.

Tempelsman was chairman of the board of directors of Lazare Kaplan International Inc. (LKI), the largest diamond company in the United States, noted for its "ideal cut" diamonds sold worldwide under the brand name Lazare Diamonds. Tempelsman was one of fewer than 90 "sightholders" in the world, which means that 10 times a year he was permitted to buy diamonds directly from the powerful De Beers cartel in the City of London. Because De Beers was a virtual monopoly, for many years it could not operate legally in the United States.

== Philanthropic and political activities ==
Tempelsman maintained relations with political and business leaders, in particular government leaders in Africa and Russia, and leading figures in the U.S. Democratic Party. His extensive political contacts and monetary contributions often provided him with access and prestige in those markets, as was the case during the presidency of Bill Clinton. From 1993 to 1997, Tempelsman visited the White House at least ten times, met privately with Hillary Clinton on two occasions, vacationed with the Clintons and the Kennedy family in Martha's Vineyard, and flew to Moscow and back with President Clinton on Air Force One.

In Southern Africa, Tempelsman played a key role in negotiations between hostile governments and companies engaging in diamond exploration. He met with Mobutu Sese Seko, to assist the regime's business dealings with De Beers. In the 1960s Tempelsman hired as his business agent the CIA station chief in Kinshasa, Larry Devlin, who helped put Mobutu in power and afterward served as his personal adviser. From March 3, 1977, Tempelsman briefly held the title of honorary consul general for Zaire, now known as the Democratic Republic of Congo (DRC), at the DRC's consular offices in New York City. In addition to the DRC, Tempelsman played a key role in the diamond industries of Angola, Botswana, Namibia, and Sierra Leone.

Tempelsman served as chairman of the Corporate Council on Africa (CCA) from 1999 to 2002 and again from 2007 to 2008, after which he was named chairman emeritus. An example of his work with the CCA involved assisting government leaders with establishing the New Partnership for Africa's Development. Tempelsman was a board member of the Southern African Enterprise Development Fund, and past chairman and long-serving board member of the Africa-America Institute.

Tempelsman was a trustee of the Eurasia Foundation, and a director of the National Democratic Institute for International Affairs, the Center for National Policy, the Business Council for International Understanding, and the U.S.-Russia Business Council.

He was chairman of the International Advisory Council of the Harvard School of Public Health's AIDS Initiative, and was an honorary trustee and an honorary member of the corporation of the Woods Hole Oceanographic Institution. Tempelsman was a member of the Council on Foreign Relations, and was named a visitor to the Department of Classical Art at the Museum of Fine Arts, Boston. A director of the Academy of American Poets, Tempelsman also served as a trustee of the New York University Institute of Fine Arts, and on Lenox Hill Hospital's advisory board. He has served on several Presidential Commissions including the President's Commission for the Observance of Human Rights, the Citizen's advisory board of Youth Opportunities and the National Highway Safety Advisory Committee, and was appointed to the New York Council on International Business.

== Morgantina acroliths ==
In 1980, Tempelsman purchased two 500 BC acroliths representing Demeter and Persephone (consisting of two marble heads, three feet, and three hands) from the subsequently-infamous art dealer, Robin Symes, for $1 million.

The Italian government claimed the items when on display in a 1988 exhibition at the J. Paul Getty Museum in Malibu; the museum had listed them as belonging to a private collector. The Italian authorities determined that they were looted from Morgantina, and smuggled into Switzerland, where they were acquired by Symes. They were finally repatriated to the archeological museum of Aidone in 2007, after being on exhibit for five years at the Fralin Museum of Art, part of the University of Virginia in Charlottesville. Putatively, in 2005, Tempelsman donated the pieces to the university museum, and the restitution to Italy was mediated by the university's archeology professor Malcolm Bell III.

== Personal life ==
=== Marriage and children ===
In 1949, Tempelsman married Lilly Bucholz or Burkos (sources differ), who had also fled Antwerp with her family. Together they had three children, Rena, Leon and Marcy. Their daughter Rena is the widow of Robert Speisman, an executive vice president of Lazare Kaplan International Inc. who died on board American Airlines Flight 77, when the aircraft crashed into The Pentagon during the September 11 attacks.

Tempelsman and Bucholz separated in 1984. However, they never legally divorced. Lilly died in 2022.

=== Relationship with Jacqueline Onassis ===
Tempelsman was the longtime companion of Jacqueline Kennedy Onassis. Tempelsman and his wife Lilly had previously been frequent guests in the White House during the Kennedy Administration, with Tempelsman eventually becoming Jackie's financial advisor. The two began their relationship in 1980, five years after the death of Jacqueline Onassis's second husband Aristotle Onassis. In 1988, Tempelsman moved into Onassis's Fifth Avenue penthouse apartment in New York City. Details of their romance received limited, if any, media coverage until the time after Onassis's death in 1994, with the New York Times even noting that Tempelsman had been "quietly at her side" even toward the end of her life and did not go "public" until afterwards. Even by 1989, Templesman was described as a "public escort and private companion" who only "stayed several nights a week in Onassis's Fifth Avenue Apartment" rather than living there altogether, with Onassis also living a more private life by 1988.

During their relationship, he handled Onassis's finances, quadrupling the $26 million that was secured from the estate of her late husband Aristotle Onassis. The couple frequently took walks through Central Park and were photographed doing so in the days preceding her death in May 1994. At Onassis's funeral Mass, Tempelsman read Constantine P. Cavafy's poem Ithaca, one of her favorites, and concluded by saying: "And now the journey is over, too short, alas, too short. It was filled with adventure and wisdom, laughter and love, gallantry and grace. So farewell, farewell."

Tempelsman was one of two executors of the will that Onassis had drawn up with her long-time attorney, Alexander D. Forger. She left him a "Greek alabaster head of a woman" and named Tempelsman to be a co‑chair of a charitable organization, the C & J Foundation. Ultimately, there was no residuary left to fund the foundation after estate taxes were paid.

=== Death ===
Tempelsman died of complications from a fall at Weill Cornell Medical Center in Manhattan on August 23, 2025, three days before his 96th birthday.

== See also ==
- List of Belgian Americans
- List of New York University alumni
- List of people from Antwerp
- List of people from New York City
