= Pseudo-Simons =

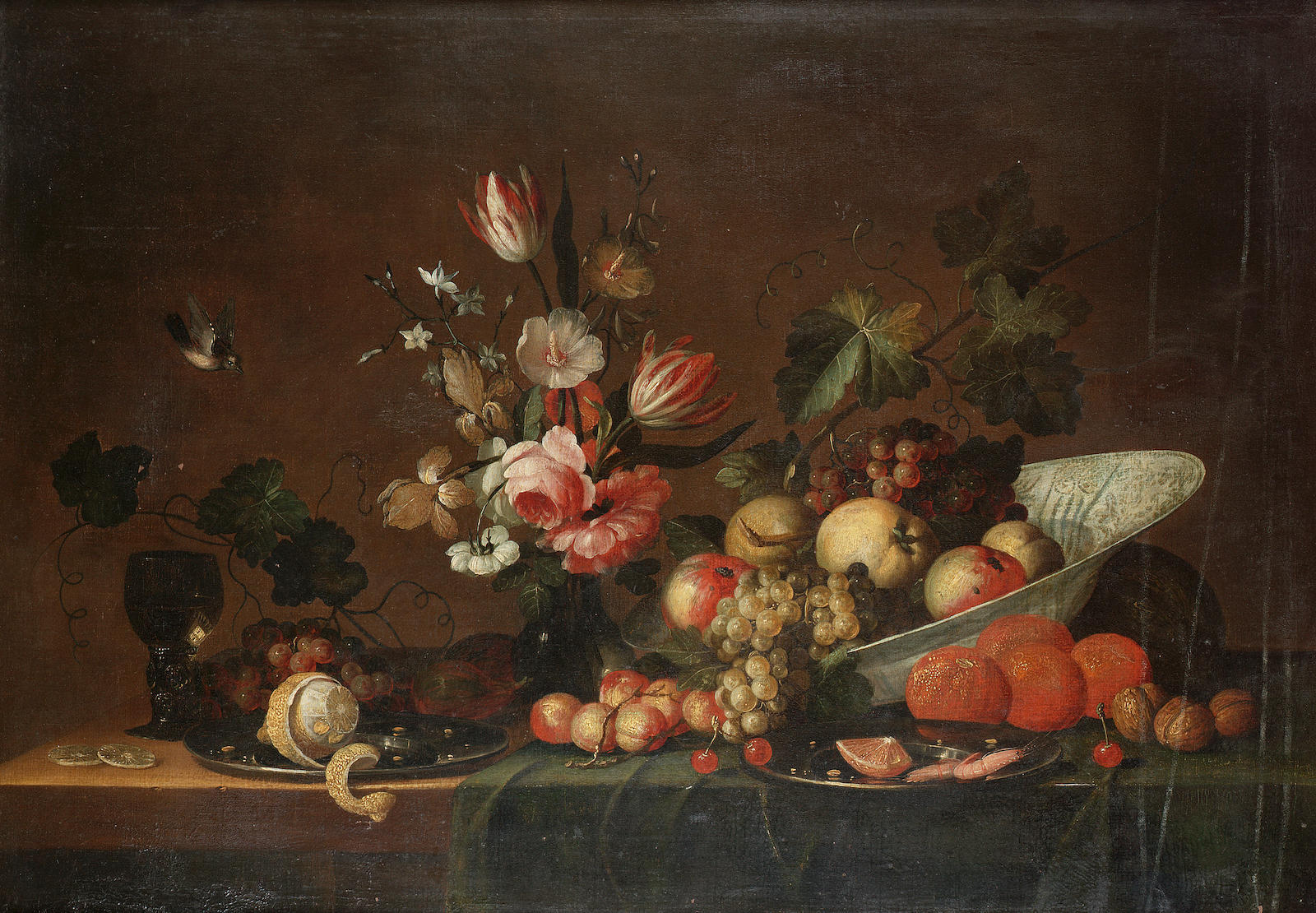
Apples and grapes in a wan-li kraakware dish

The Pseudo-Simons is the notname given to a painter presumed to have been active in Antwerp during the second half of the 17th century and attributed with around 100 works, principally of fruit and flower still lifes as well as pronkstillevens.

== Identification of the artist ==
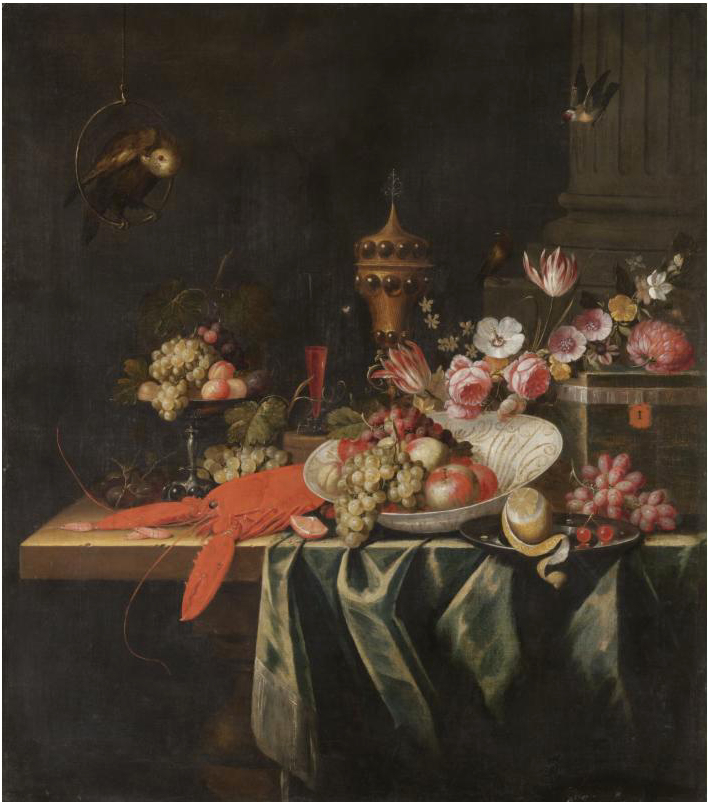
Still life with grapes and apples in a porcelain bowl

The notname of this artist was given by Fred Meijer of the Netherlands Institute for Art History after he grouped a body of about 100 works he considered likely to be of common origin. During the 20th century, these works been attributed to the Dutch still-life painter Michiel Simons (fl. 1648–1673). The attribution to Simons was based the works' stylistic similarities to the work of Jan Davidszoon de Heem, Ambrosius Bosschaert II and Johannes Bosschaert II. These three artists, like Simons, had all worked in Utrecht, Netherlands.

Meijer found that the style was closer to that of Flemish still-life painters of the second half of the 17th century such as Jan Pauwel Gillemans the Elder and Jan Pauwel Gillemans the Younger, concluding that the artist must have must have been familiar with their work. The artist was named the "Pseudo-Simons" due to the erroneous attribution to Simons.

It is believed that this anonymous artist worked in Antwerp some time between 1650 and 1680. He also may have worked in England, which would account for the early presence of his works in English collections.

== Work ==
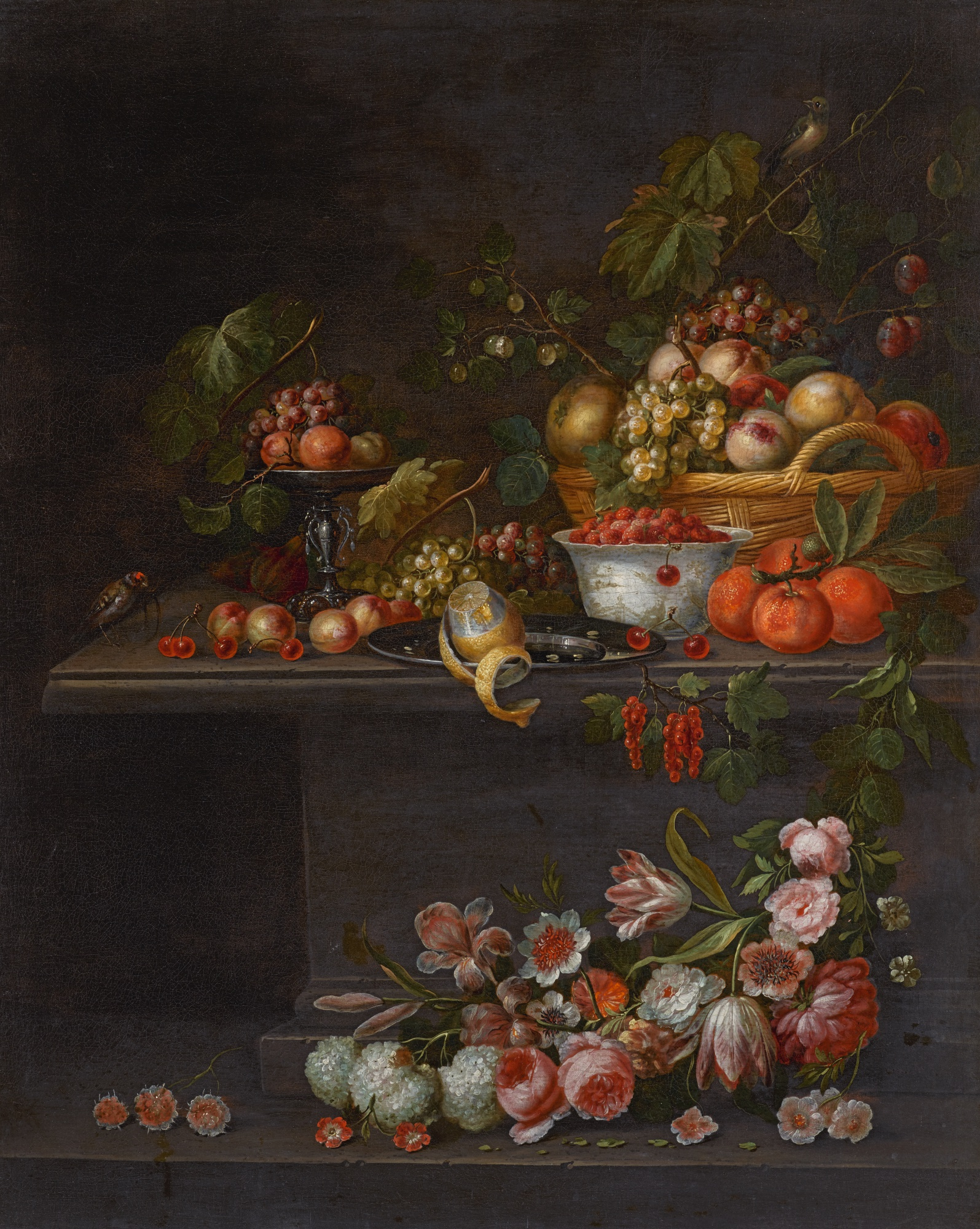
Fruit still life on a stone table with flowers below

About 100 works have been attributed to the Pseudo-Simons. None of the works are signed. These works are principally fruit still lifes, along with some flower still lifes and pronkstillevens (sumptuous still lifes of luxurious objects). His style and subjects show the influence of his contemporary Flemish painters.
