= Lodewyk van Bercken =

15th-century Flemish jeweller and diamond cutter

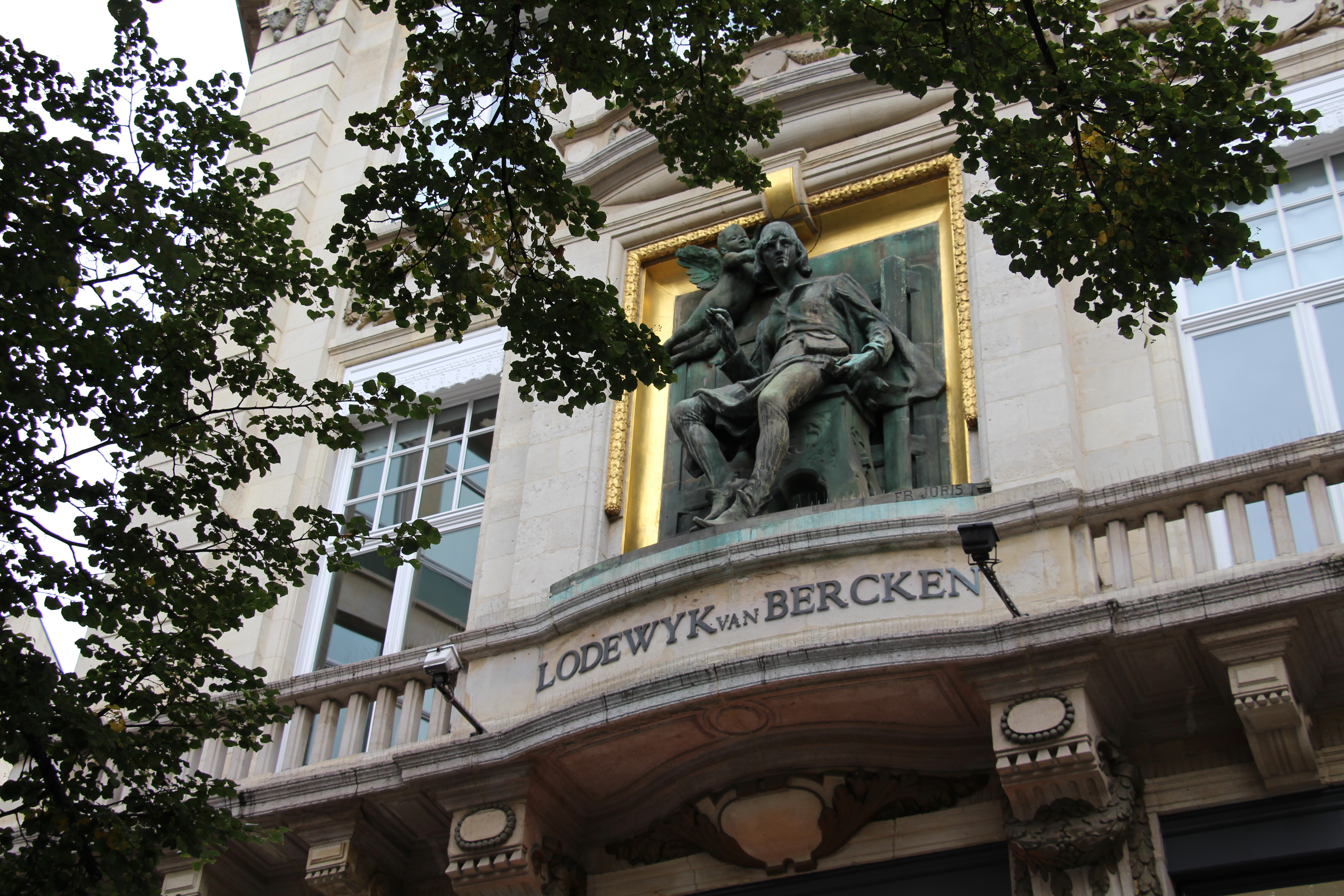
Statue of van Bercken in Antwerp

Lodewyk van Bercken (also known in French as Louis de Berquem) was a mid- to late-15th century Flemish jeweller and diamond cutter, renowned in the industry for inventing the scaif. The device revolutionized the diamond cutting industry and contributed to increased popularity of diamonds.

== About ==
Van Bercken was born in Bruges. He is credited with inventing the scaif, a polishing wheel infused with a mixture of olive oil and diamond dust. With the scaif, it became possible to polish all the facets of the diamond symmetrically at angles that best reflected the light.

== Charles the Bold ==
Charles the Bold, Duke of Burgundy became the patron of van Bercken and in the 1470s commissioned him to cut a 137 carat (27.4 g) stone that later became known as the Florentine Diamond. Van Bercken experimented with three diamonds belonging to Charles the Bold. One stone was the Beau Sancy, another became the property of Pope Sixtus V, and the third was given by Charles to Louis XI. Later Charles the Bold also sent one of his favorite jewels to be recut, which is now known as the Sancy Diamond.

== Legacy ==
Diamonds became popular as ornaments in jewelry in the 1400s and the different techniques and styles of diamond cuts were gradually developed over many years.

Lodewyk van Bercken was a Flemish diamond polisher who invented the scaif. This ingenious polishing wheel enabled him to quickly cut facets into diamonds with precision. The scaif transformed the diamond trade. It opened the doors to the creation of complex diamond cuts which otherwise would have never been possible. The scaif is still used today as an essential tool for the diamond industry in order to create facets on diamonds. In 1475, Lodewyk van Bercken invented the world's first briolette cut diamond. He introduced the concept of absolute symmetry in the placement of facets on the stone. His meticulous and precisely studied advancements resulted in the first pear shaped briolette cut, a revolutionary breakthrough on shape, design and cutting excellence.

A bronze statue in commemoration of Lodewyk Van Bercken's contributions to the diamond industry, can be seen at the beginning of Meir Street in Antwerp, Belgium. The statue depicts Lodewyk Van Bercken holding a diamond in his hand with a baby angel floating above.
