= Dimple Mehta =

British-Indian fashion designer

Dimple Mehta is a British-Indian fashion designer and creative director known for her work in couture fashion. She is the founder and head designer of her eponymous luxury bridal and occasion wear label, Dimple Mehta (formerly known as Dimple Amrin).

== Biography ==
Mehta was born in London and spent part of her early life in Europe, including Belgium, before later relocating to India.

Mehta began her involvement in fashion design in 1996, initially designing garments on a small scale before entering the commercial fashion industry more formally in the early 2010s. She launched couture brand "Dimple Mehta" reportedly around 2011–2012 in Mumbai.

Mehta has presented her collections at various fashion events, including international fashion weeks such as those held in New York, London, Paris, and Dubai. In 2018 and 2019, Mehta received media attention for her mixed-media couture gowns showcased at the Cannes Film Festival. These collections reportedly featured intricate hand-painting, resham embroidery, and bead embellishments designed as tributes to the late Indian actress Sridevi and fashion designer Karl Lagerfeld.

Aside from her work in bridal design, Mehta works as a stylist and creative director for music videos, short films, and international beauty pageants. Since 2018, she has been involved in the styling, grooming, and mentorship of contestants for national and international competitions, including Miss Universe India.
