= Jan Gruter =

Flemish-born philologist, scholar, and librarian (1560-1627)

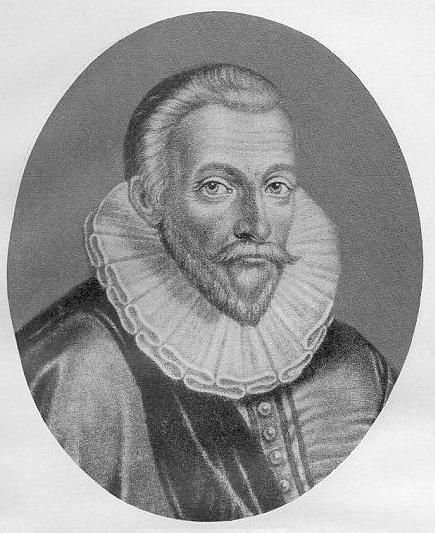
Jan Gruter

Jan Gruter or Gruytère, Latinized as Janus Gruterus (3 December 1560 – 20 September 1627), was a Flemish-born philologist, scholar, and librarian.

== Life ==
Jan Gruter was born in Antwerp. His father was Wouter Gruter, who was a merchant and city administrator of Antwerp, and his mother was Catharina Tishem from Norwich in England. To avoid religious persecution in the early stages of the Eighty Years' War, his parents emigrated to England while he was a child. For some years he studied at Caius College, Cambridge, after which he went to Leiden. In 1584 he obtained the degree of doctor iuris. He then left the Netherlands and commenced a period of travel that brought him to France, Switzerland, Italy and finally to North and East Germany. His Neo-Latin poems are published in Heidelberg at this time.

In 1590, Gruter was appointed professor of history at the University of Wittenberg. As a Calvinist, he refused to subscribe to the formula concordiae, the authoritative Lutheran statement of faith, and lost his position as a result in 1592. From 1589 to 1592, he taught at Rostock, after which he went to Heidelberg, where in 1602 he was appointed librarian to the university. He died at Bierhelderhof, Heidelberg.

== Works ==
Gruter's chief works were:

- Inscriptiones antiquae totius orbis Romani (Note: In full Inscriptiones antiquae totius orbis romani, in absolutissimum corpus redactae, "Ancient inscriptions of the entire Roman world, edited in the most complete assemblage".) (2 vols., Heidelberg, 1603)
- Lampas, sive fax artium liberalium (Note: In full Lampas, sive fax artium liberalium hoc est, thesaurus criticus, in quo infinitis locis theologorum, jurisconsultorum, medicorum etc., scripta supplentur, "A lamp, or torchlight of the liberal arts, in which is offered a critical thesaurus, of infinite examples drawn from theologists, legal experts, doctors, etc.") (7 vols., Frankfort-am-Main, 1602–1634).
