= Cats (1998 film) =

1998 British film by David Mallet

- DVD cover
- Directed by: David Mallet
- Based on: Cats by Andrew Lloyd Webber; Old Possum's Book of Practical Cats by T.S. Eliot
- Produced by: Andrew Lloyd Webber
- Starring: Elaine Paige; John Mills; Ken Page
- Cinematography: Nic Knowland
- Edited by: David Gardener
- Music by: Andrew Lloyd Webber
- Production company: Really Useful Films
- Distributed by: PolyGram Video
- Release date: 5 October 1998
- Running time: 115 minutes
- Country: United Kingdom
- Language: English

Cats is a 1998 British direct-to-video musical film based on the 1981 stage musical by Andrew Lloyd Webber, itself based on Old Possum's Book of Practical Cats (1939) by T. S. Eliot. Lloyd Webber oversaw orchestration and called on Gillian Lynne, the show's original choreographer, to train the cast members. David Mallet served as the director of this production.

The film is a recreation of the stage musical, but with new staging and significant edits made to reduce the runtime for television broadcast. It was filmed at the Adelphi Theatre in London in 1997, with the cast selected from various past and (then) present international productions of Cats. Initially released to VHS and subsequently DVD and Blu-ray, the film has since been shown on television channels including PBS, BBC and Ovation TV.

== Synopsis ==
Partial cast of the filmed version of Cats.

After the overture, the Cats gather on stage and describe the Jellicle tribe and its purpose ("Jellicle Songs for Jellicle Cats"). The cats (who break the fourth wall throughout) then notice that they are being watched, and proceed to explain how the different cats of the tribe are named ("The Naming of Cats"). This is followed by a ballet solo performed by a young, white kitten named Victoria to signal the beginning of the Jellicle Ball ("The Invitation to the Jellicle Ball"). At this moment, Munkustrap, the main narrator, explains that tonight the Jellicle patriarch Old Deuteronomy will make his appearance and choose one of the cats to be reborn into a new life on the Heaviside Layer.

The first contender Munkustrap introduces is Jennyanydots ("The Old Gumbie Cat"), a large tabby cat who lazes around all day, but come nighttime, becomes active, teaching mice and cockroaches various activities to curb their naturally destructive habits. Just as Jennyanydots finishes her song, the music changes suddenly and the Rum Tum Tugger makes his extravagant entrance in front of the tribe ("The Rum Tum Tugger"). He is fickle and unappeasable, "for he will do as he do do, and there's no doing anything about it".

Then, as Rum Tum Tugger's song fades, a shabby, old, grey cat stumbles out wanting to be reconciled; it is Grizabella. All the cats back away from her in fear and disgust and explain her unfortunate state ("Grizabella: The Glamour Cat"). Grizabella leaves and the music changes to a cheerful upbeat number as Bustopher Jones, a fat cat in "a coat of fastidious black", is brought to the stage ("Bustopher Jones: The Cat About Town"). Bustopher Jones is among the elite of the cats, and visits prestigious gentlemen's clubs. Suddenly, a loud crash startles the tribe and the cats run offstage in fright.

Hushed giggling sounds signal the entrance of Mungojerrie and Rumpleteazer, a pair of near-identical cats. They are mischievous petty burglars who enjoy causing trouble around their human neighborhood ("Mungojerrie and Rumpleteazer"). After they finish, they are caught off-guard and confronted by the rest of the cats.

Finally, the Jellicle patriarch, Old Deuteronomy, arrives before the tribe ("Old Deuteronomy"). He is a wise old cat who "has lived many lives" and is tasked with choosing which Jellicle will go to the Heaviside Layer every year. The cats put on a play for Old Deuteronomy ("The Awefull Battle of the Pekes and the Pollicles"), telling a story about two dog tribes clashing in the street and subsequently being scared away by the Great Rumpus Cat. A somber moral from Old Deuteronomy is interrupted by a second loud crash, presumably from Macavity, which sends the alarmed cats scurrying. After a quick patrol for Macavity, Old Deuteronomy deems it a false alarm and summons the cats back as the main celebration begins ("The Jellicle Ball"), in which the cats sing and display their "Terpsichorean powers". During the Ball, Grizabella reappears and is once again shunned by the other cats ("Grizabella: The Glamour Cat (Reprise)") while Old Deuteronomy looks on sadly. She tries to dance along, but her age and decrepit condition prevent her from doing so ("Memory (Prelude)").

After the Jellicle Ball, Old Deuteronomy contemplates "what happiness is", referring to Grizabella. However, the cats do not understand him, so he has Jemima, the youngest of all Jellicles, sing it in simpler terms ("The Moments of Happiness"). Gus – short for Asparagus – shuffles forward as the next cat to be introduced ("Gus: The Theatre Cat"). He was once a famous actor but is now old and "suffers from palsy which makes his paws shake". He is accompanied by Jellylorum, his caretaker, who tells of his exploits. Gus then remembers his past acting career. After Gus exits, Skimbleshanks is seen sleeping in the corner ("Skimbleshanks: The Railway Cat"). He is the cat who is unofficially in charge of the night train to Glasgow. Skimbleshanks is considered vital to the rail operations, as without him "the train can't start". Within his song, a whole steam train engine is assembled out of objects in the junkyard.

With a third crash and an evil laugh, the "most wanted" cat Macavity appears. He is the so-called "Napoleon of Crime" who always manages to evade the authorities. Macavity's henchmen capture Old Deuteronomy and take off with the patriarch in tow. As Munkustrap and his troop give chase, Demeter and Bombalurina explain what they know about Macavity ("Macavity: The Mystery Cat"). When they are finished, Macavity returns disguised as Old Deuteronomy, but his cover is blown by Demeter and he ends up in a fight with Munkustrap and Alonzo. Macavity holds his own for a time, but as the rest of the tribe begins to gang up and surround him, he shorts out the stage lights and escapes in the resulting confusion. After the fight, Rum Tum Tugger calls upon the magician Mr. Mistoffelees for help ("Magical Mr. Mistoffelees"). Known as the "original conjuring cat", Mr. Mistoffelees can perform feats of magic that no other cat can do. He displays his magical powers in a dance solo and uses them to restore the lights and bring back Old Deuteronomy. Now, the Jellicle Choice can be made.

Before Old Deuteronomy can announce his decision, Grizabella returns to the junkyard and he allows her to address the gathering. Her faded appearance and lonely disposition have little effect on her song ("Memory"). With acceptance and encouragement from Jemima and Victoria, her appeal succeeds and she is chosen to be the one to go to the Heaviside Layer and be reborn into a new Jellicle life ("The Journey to the Heaviside Layer"). A tyre rises from the piles of junk, carrying Grizabella and Old Deuteronomy partway towards the sky; Grizabella then completes the journey on her own. Finally, Old Deuteronomy gives an address ("The Ad-dressing of Cats").

== Cast and characters ==
The cast for the film consists of former and contemporary members of various international stage productions of Cats, who were invited to reprise their stage roles. Among the cast were Elaine Paige and Susan Jane Tanner who originated the roles of Grizabella and Jellylorum in the West End respectively, and Ken Page who originated the role of Old Deuteronomy on Broadway. The exception was John Mills who was brought on to play Gus for the first time.

The characters and their respective performers include:

- Admetus: A tan, black, and beige with a soft, vaguely striped unitard, and a brown, white and black wig. He is portrayed by Frank Thompson who also plays the Rumpus Cat.
- Alonzo: An elegant black and white tom often considered the "second-in command" after Munkustrap. He flirts a lot, but can still be serious, loyal and brave. Portrayed by Jason Gardiner.
- Asparagus: A general chorus cat. (Not to be confused with Gus the Theatre Cat in the video production, as the two roles are portrayed separately due to the age of John Mills rendering him unable to perform the dancing and singing roles of Asparagus.) Portrayed by Tony Timberlake.
- Bombalurina: A very beautiful and saucy red queen, confident and outgoing. Portrayed by Rosemarie Ford.
- Bustopher Jones: A fat cat, Bustopher "dresses" in a smart suit and spats. As the upper class "St James' Street Cat", Bustopher spends his time at Gentlemen's clubs, socialising with London's high society. Portrayed by James Barron.
- Cassandra: A sleek brown and cream female Abyssinian, with a braided tail and rolled wig, and no leg warmers. Portrayed by Rebecca Parker.
- Coricopat: Male twin of Tantomile. Both of them are intuitive or even psychic, perfectly synchronised in their movements and nearly identical in appearance. Portrayed by Tommi Sliiden.
- Demeter: A shy and skittish queen. Portrayed by Aeva May.
- Electra: A quiet and reserved kitten. She is a young orange and black tabby female who is close to Etcetera as well as being a fan of the Rum Tum Tugger. Portrayed by Leah Sue Morland.
- Etcetera: A happy, energetic and excitable kitten who is a big fan of the Rum Tum Tugger. Portrayed by Jo Bingham.
- Exotica: A dark, sleek brown and cream female, similar to Cassandra in appearance. She was a character created specially for Femi Taylor, who had been part of the original London cast as Tantomile.
- Grizabella: The former Glamour Cat who has lost her sparkle and now only wants to be accepted by her former friends and family. Portrayed by original London cast member Elaine Paige.
- Gus: A retired "Theatre Cat" who is now very old and ill and can no longer perform. Portrayed by John Mills.
- Jellylorum: A mature female who watches out for the kittens and cares for Gus. Portrayed by original London cast member Susan Jane Tanner.
- Jemima: A young, innocent and curious kitten. Portrayed by Veerle Casteleyn, whose voice was dubbed over by Helen Massey due to the producers fearing that she had a noticeable accent.
- Jennyanydots: Known as the "old Gumbie cat", she sits all day and rules the mice and cockroaches by night. Portrayed by Susie McKenna.
- Macavity: The show's only real villain, he goes out of his way to terrorise the Jellicles. Portrayed by Bryn Walters.
- Mr. Mistoffelees/Quaxo: A young tom who has magical powers. His is a dance-centred role; his signature dance move is the "Conjuring Turn", which is a string of fouettés. Portrayed by Jacob Brent.
- Mungojerrie: Half of a pair of troublesome tabby cats, notorious "cat-burglars", Mungojerrie and Rumpleteazer. Portrayed by Drew Varley.
- Munkustrap: A black and silver tom who is the leader, storyteller and protector of the Jellicle tribe. Portrayed by Michael Gruber.
- Old Deuteronomy: The lovable patriarch of the Jellicle Tribe. He is very old and usually slow-moving. Portrayed by original Broadway cast member Ken Page.
- Plato: A dancing role in the film, he performs a pas de deux with Victoria. Portrayed by Bryn Walters, who also plays Macavity.
- Pouncival: A playful adolescent tom. He loves to annoy the older cats and play with the other kittens. Portrayed by Karl Morgan.
- Rumpleteazer: Female half of a pair of notorious "cat-burglars", Mungojerrie and Rumpleteazer. Portrayed by Jo Gibb.
- Rum Tum Tugger: The ladies' tom and Munkustrap's younger brother. His temperament ranges from clownish to serious. Portrayed by John Partridge.
- Rumpus Cat: A legendary spiky haired cat with glowing red eyes; he is seen as a super hero figure amongst the Jellicles. Portrayed by Frank Thompson.
- Skimbleshanks: The "railway cat". He is an active orange tabby cat who lives on a train, and acts as an unofficial chaperone of the night train to Glasgow. Portrayed by Geoffrey Garratt, but dubbed in his song by David Arneil.
- Tantomile: Female twin of Coricopat. Both of them are perceived as intuitive or even psychic as they are the first among the tribe to sense the presence of strangers. Portrayed by Kaye Brown.
- Tumblebrutus: A bouncy, troublesome young cat. Portrayed by Fergus Logan.
- Victoria: A white kitten who is extremely gifted at dancing. Portrayed by Phyllida Crowley Smith.

== Production ==
The film was shot at the Adelphi Theatre in London over the course of 18 days in August 1997. The cast vocals were recorded first, followed by two run-throughs of the entire show that were captured from multiple angles by 16 cameras, ending with a few weeks of close-up and pick-up shots.

The musical score was recorded with a 100-piece orchestra, with Simon Lee serving as the musical director and conductor. The film infuses the music from various international productions of the stage show.

=== Differences with the stage show ===
Directed for television broadcast, this production was restaged on a new set and was not filmed with an audience. Significant cuts were also made, with the film having a running time of slightly under 2 hours, compared to the 2 hours and 40 minutes running time of the stage show. The entirety of "Growltiger's Last Stand" was cut, along with parts of "The Invitation to the Jellicle Ball" and "Mungojerrie and Rumpleteazer". Extended dance sequences in "The Old Gumbie Cat" and "Mr. Mistoffelees" were filmed but omitted from the final cut of the film.

== Home media ==
Cats was initially released on VHS and DVD by Polygram Video in 1998, reaching No. 6 on the Billboard Top Video Sales chart. The home video released in 2002 by Universal Pictures is certified 19× Platinum in the UK. A Blu-ray was released in 2013 that included additional behind-the-scenes footage.

=== Broadcast ===
The film premiered on PBS' Great Performances on 2 November 1998. It has been televised on other channels, including BBC and Ovation TV, and was shown on Great Performances again in November 2014.

=== Streaming ===
In May 2020, Lloyd Webber announced that he would broadcast this film on YouTube with live commentary in honor of his beloved cat Mika, who was hit and killed by a car that morning.

As of February 2021, the video remains up but consists only of his commentary. It is unknown if an earlier copy included the film onscreen.
