= Jennyanydots =

Character from Cats

- Cats character
- First appearance: Cats (1981)
- Created by: Andrew Lloyd Webber
- Based on: Old Possum's Book of Practical Cats by T. S. Eliot

Jennyanydots is a fictional character from T. S. Eliot's 1939 poetry book Old Possum's Book of Practical Cats. She is also a principal character in the 1981 Andrew Lloyd Webber musical Cats, which is based on Eliot's work. Jennyanydots is a seemingly lazy Jellicle cat who sits around all day, but at night, she becomes very active as she rules the mice and cockroaches, forcing them to undertake helpful functions and creative projects to curb their naturally destructive habits.

In Cats, Jennyanydots' musical number involves her leading a tap dancing routine. The character was originated by Myra Sands in the West End in 1981, and by Anna McNeely on Broadway in 1982. In the 2019 film adaptation, she is portrayed by Rebel Wilson.

== Character ==
The titular character of Eliot's poem "The Old Gumbie Cat", Jennyanydots is an "Edwardian do-gooder" who enjoys making sure everything is in order. During the day, her human family thinks she is lazy because she sits around doing nothing. However, she goes to work once the family is asleep, forcing the household pests to undertake productive activities. She teaches the mice music, crocheting, and tatting, and employs the cockroaches as her "troop of helpful boy-scouts" to counter their destructive habits. She even created a beetles tattoo and taught them how to tap dance. She is also very protective of the kittens and does not allow any of them to touch Grizabella initially, though by the end of the musical she accepts Grizabella back into the tribe.

Jennyanydots' titular song ("The Old Gumbie Cat") involves her leading the cast in a tap dancing number. It is sung by Munkustrap and the "Gumbie Trio" (Bombalurina, Demeter and Jellylorum). During the song, the character's "fat suit" is removed to reveal a bright orange and yellow flapper style costume underneath.

Jennyanydots is a tabby cat with a coat that is covered with tiger stripes and leopard spots. Vocally, the role is meant to be played by a soprano.

== Notable casting ==
Jennyanydots was portrayed by Myra Sands in the original West End production in 1981. The role was to have been played by Judi Dench along with Grizabella, but when Dench had to withdraw, Sands as her understudy took over Jennyanydots. On Broadway, she was originated by Anna McNeely in the original 1982 production, and by Eloise Kropp in the 2016 revival.

On screen, Jennyanydots was portrayed by Susie McKenna in the 1998 film version, and is played by Rebel Wilson in the 2019 film adaptation.
