= Jellylorum =

- Susan Jane Tanner as Jellylorum.
- Created by: T. S. Eliot
- Portrayed by: Susan Jane Tanner (London, video); Bonnie Simmons (Broadway); Shereen Pimentel (Off-Broadway)

In-universe information
- Species: Cat
- Gender: Female

Jellylorum is a principal character in the musical Cats. One of the Jellicle cats, she is usually portrayed as a motherly caretaker and is principally a vocalist. The musical is based on the 1939 collection of poems by T. S. Eliot from Old Possum's Book of Practical Cats, and Jellylorum is named after the poet's own cat.

The role of Jellylorum originated with Susan Jane Tanner in the West End in 1981, and with Bonnie Simmons on Broadway in 1982. Freya Rowley played Jellylorum in the 2019 film adaptation.

== Origins ==
Jellylorum was originally the subject of a T. S. Eliot poem entitled "The Naming of Cats". The character's name is believed to mean "lillie cat", "wisdom" or "tradition", but traduced to Spanish is "Agiolorum".

== Character ==
Jellylorum is a practical and motherly older cat. She is one of the adult characters who initially protects the kittens from Grizabella, whom she later comes to accept. Jellylorum serves as a caretaker for the elderly Gus: The Theatre Cat, and the two sing a duet in the second act of the musical. Jellylorum is also frequently shown as being close friends with Jennyanydots and Skimbleshanks.

On stage, Jellylorum is usually depicted as a predominantly yellow calico or tabby cat. The character's age varies according to the production; many productions have Jellylorum near the age of Bombalurina and Demeter, but others portray the character as slightly older. In the 1998 filmed version, Jellylorum is closer in age to Jennyanydots.

== Songs ==
In Cats, Jellylorum has four main singing parts:

- In "The Old Gumbie Cat" Jellylorum is part of the female chorus often called the "Gumbie Trio".
- In "Bustopher Jones: the Cat About Town" Jellylorum is one of three female soloists.
- In "Gus: the Theatre Cat" Jellylorum sings a duet with Gus.
- In "Growltiger's Last Stand" Jellylorum performs the part of Griddlebone in most productions.

The role of Jellylorum is principally a vocalist part and is played by a soprano who is able to hit high C.

== Notable casting ==
The role of Jellylorum was originated by Susan Jane Tanner in the original West End production in 1981, and by Bonnie Simmons in the original Broadway production in 1982. Other notable performers to have played the character include: Iselin Alme (Oslo, original cast); Susana Zabaleta (Mexico City, original cast); Sara Jean Ford (2016 Broadway revival, original cast).

On screen, Tanner reprised the role in the 1998 filmed version. Freya Rowley played the role in the 2019 film adaptation.The role has also been played by Robyn Chambers. Shereen Pimentel originated the role for the 2024 Off-Broadway production.
