= Demeter (cat) =

Character from the musical Cats

- Demeter as depicted in Cats

Demeter is a main character in the Andrew Lloyd Webber musical Cats. The musical is an adaptation of T. S. Eliot's 1939 poetry book Old Possum's Book of Practical Cats, and the character's name is given in the poem "The Naming of Cats". Demeter is a very troubled and skittish female Jellicle cat. The role was originated by Sharon Lee-Hill in the West End in 1981, and by Wendy Edmead on Broadway in 1982. Daniela Norman played this role in the 2019 film adaptation.

== Character description ==
Demeter is a refined and mature adult cat. She is best friends with Bombalurina and often turns to the latter for help in unpleasant situations. Unlike Bombalurina, she shows no interest in Rum Tum Tugger's advances. Despite her outward appearances, she is very troubled inside and particularly paranoid when it comes to the villainous Macavity, who she has an intense hatred for.

Demeter is the cat who unmasks Macavity when he tries to trick the tribe by disguising as their leader Old Deuteronomy. She is one of the few adult cats to attempt to welcome Grizabella, but cannot bring herself to fully accept her until the show is almost over.

The role of Demeter is dance-heavy and usually calls for a mezzo-soprano range with a high belt.

=== Appearance ===
Demeter, as costumed in the 1998 filmed production, is black and gold with a few patches of white and red or orange, and wears gloves instead of arm warmers, giving her a more elegant touch. In other productions she has larger patches of red. She has a few tabby markings around her face and legs.

== Songs ==
Demeter sings in the backing group in "The Gumbie Cat" with Bombalurina and Jellylorum. Her biggest singing part is in "Macavity", which she sings with Bombalurina. She also sings part of "Grizabella the Glamour Cat".

== Casting ==
The role of Demeter was originated by Sharon Lee-Hill in the original West End production in 1981, and by Wendy Edmead in the original Broadway production in 1982. Other notable performers include Lena Hall, who was a replacement in the original Broadway show from 1999 to 2000, and Zizi Strallen, who played Demeter in the 2014 West End revival.

On screen, Aeva May played Demeter in the 1998 film, and Daniela Norman portrayed the character in the 2019 film adaptation.
