= Cats (2019 film) =

2019 film directed by Tom Hooper

- Theatrical release poster
- Directed by: Tom Hooper
- Screenplay by: Lee Hall; Tom Hooper
- Based on: Cats by Andrew Lloyd Webber; Old Possum's Book of Practical Cats by T. S. Eliot
- Produced by: Debra Hayward; Tim Bevan; Eric Fellner; Tom Hooper
- Starring: James Corden; Judi Dench; Jason Derulo; Idris Elba; Jennifer Hudson; Ian McKellen; Taylor Swift; Rebel Wilson; Francesca Hayward
- Cinematography: Christopher Ross
- Edited by: Melanie Oliver
- Music by: Andrew Lloyd Webber
- Production companies: Working Title Films; Amblin Entertainment; Perfect World Pictures; Monumental Pictures; The Really Useful Group
- Distributed by: Universal Pictures
- Release dates: 16 December 2019 (Alice Tully Hall); 20 December 2019 (United Kingdom and United States)
- Running time: 110 minutes
- Countries: United Kingdom; United States
- Language: English
- Budget: $80–100 million
- Box office: $78.4 million

Cats is a 2019 musical fantasy film based on the 1981 West End musical Cats by Andrew Lloyd Webber, which in turn was based on the 1939 poetry collection Old Possum's Book of Practical Cats by T. S. Eliot, another inspiration for the film. The film was directed by Tom Hooper, in his second feature musical following Les Misérables (2012), from a screenplay by Lee Hall and Hooper. It stars an ensemble cast including James Corden, Judi Dench, Jason Derulo in his feature film debut, Idris Elba, Jennifer Hudson, Ian McKellen, Taylor Swift, Rebel Wilson, and Francesca Hayward in her feature film debut.

Filming took place from December 2018 to April 2019. It premiered at Alice Tully Hall in New York City on 16 December 2019 and went into general release in the United Kingdom and the United States on 20 December. Cats grossed $78.4 million worldwide against a production budget of $80–100 million, resulting in an estimated loss of $71 million after ancillary costs, becoming a box office failure. The film received generally negative reviews from critics and audiences, who were unsettled by the humanoid cats created through visual effects, and is considered to be one of the worst films ever made.

== Plot ==
Victoria, a young white cat, is abandoned by her owner in the streets of pre-war London in the middle of the night. Witnessing this, a group of alley cats introduce themselves to her as the "Jellicles". Mr. Mistoffelees, Munkustrap, Cassandra, and Demeter take Victoria under their wing and show her the world of the Jellicles as they prepare for the Jellicle Ball, an annual ceremony where cats must compete to be chosen to go to the Heaviside Layer and be granted a new life.

Most of the Jellicle Ball competitors are introduced and sing about themselves: Jennyanydots, a domestic tabby who sleeps during the day and boosts the productivity of mice and roaches by night; the Rum Tum Tugger, an extravagant yet indecisive cat who riles up the others; Bustopher Jones, a bourgeois cat who boasts about his weight, and takes food scraps from the garbage; Skimbleshanks, a tidy ginger cat who tap dances and is a train conductor; as well as Gus, an old cat who is a very successful actor.

Victoria also happens to meet the mischievous twins, Mungojerrie and Rumpleteazer, who enjoy causing trouble and messing with things in the house of their human family. They convince Victoria to join in the fun, but leave her tangled up in some necklaces when the family dog is alerted to their presence. Mr. Mistoffelees comes to rescue Victoria, distracting the dog and escaping with her. They return to the group just in time for the arrival of the tribe's wise and beloved matriarch, Old Deuteronomy. The Jellicle Ball commences inside the abandoned Egyptian Theatre. Victoria dances a ballet solo in the moonlight but is distracted by Cassandra harassing Grizabella, a former glamour cat who was banished from the tribe for, among other things, her past allegiance with Macavity, a notorious criminal and con artist capable of teleportation. Victoria relates to Grizabella's feelings of abandonment. As Grizabella slinks away into the streets, Old Deuteronomy witnesses their quiet camaraderie and assures Victoria that she can become a Jellicle herself in time.

A seductive femme fatale named Bombalurina interrupts the ball, distracting the Jellicles present with a song and dance number praising Macavity and simultaneously incapacitating them with catnip. When Macavity arrives and demands to be made the Jellicle Choice, Old Deuteronomy deems him unworthy and is subsequently kidnapped and placed with most of the other contestants that he has kidnapped. As the Jellicles recuperate, distraught over their leader's disappearance, Victoria suggests that Mr. Mistoffelees use his powers to conjure Old Deuteronomy back. He tries several times, eventually making Old Deuteronomy reappear. The cats rejoice and praise Mr. Mistoffelees, and he and Victoria dance together. Meanwhile, a thwarted Macavity and Bombalurina teleport away from his victims, who begin to free themselves via Jennyanydots' costume change. Macavity leaves his lackey, Growltiger, to walk the plank defenseless against the emancipated cats.

Grizabella returns to the Egyptian Theatre. Victoria vouches for her and urges her to sing her true feelings. Grizabella sings a passionate ballad about her mistakes, her former glory, and her beauty, sentiments that touch the hearts of the Jellicles. Old Deuteronomy names Grizabella the Jellicle Choice and sends her off to the Heaviside Layer in a chandelier (repaired by Mr. Mistoffelees' magic to float like a hot air balloon). Macavity, in one last attempt to reach the Heaviside Layer, leaps onto a rope from the chandelier, but falls onto Nelson's Column. The Jellicles, reunited with their kidnapped brethren, and perched on a lion statue, watch Grizabella ascend as the morning sun appears above the horizon. After the congregation disperses, Old Deuteronomy welcomes Victoria to the tribe.

== Cast ==
- Francesca Hayward as Victoria the White Cat
- Judi Dench as Old Deuteronomy
- Idris Elba as Macavity
- Jennifer Hudson as Grizabella
- Laurie Davidson as Mr. Mistoffelees
- Robbie Fairchild as Munkustrap
- Rebel Wilson as Jennyanydots
- James Corden as Bustopher Jones
- Jason Derulo as Rum Tum Tugger
- Ian McKellen as Gus the Theatre Cat
- Taylor Swift as Bombalurina
- Steven McRae as Skimbleshanks
- Danny Collins as Mungojerrie
- Naoimh Morgan as Rumpleteazer
- Ray Winstone as Growltiger
- Mette Towley as Cassandra
- Daniela Norman as Demeter
- Les Twins as Plato and Socrates
- Jaih Betote as Coricopat
- Jonadette Carpio as Jemima
- Bluey Robinson as Alonzo
- Freya Rowley as Jellylorum
- Ida Saki as Electra
- Zizi Strallen as Tantomile
- Eric Underwood as Admetus
- Cory English as Maître D'

== Production ==
=== Development ===
An animated film adaptation based on the musical was initially planned by Amblimation in the 1990s, but was abandoned with the studio's closure. In December 2013, Andrew Lloyd Webber, creator and composer of the musical stage production Cats, teased that Universal Pictures, which had purchased the film rights to Cats many years earlier, was putting the project into active development.

In February 2016, it was reported that Tom Hooper was in negotiations to direct the film, and was considering actresses, including Suki Waterhouse, to star. In May 2016, Hooper was confirmed as director.

In January 2018, Hooper and Working Title began officially casting for the film, while looking into the technical aspect of whether the film would be entirely live-action or computer generated, with Lloyd Webber announcing he would be writing a new song for the film adaptation. On 24 October 2019, it was announced that the new song was titled "Beautiful Ghosts", written by Lloyd Webber and Taylor Swift. The song was sung by Francesca Hayward, followed later in a reprise by Judi Dench, with a credits version sung by Swift. The version sung by Swift was released on 15 November 2019.

=== Casting ===
In June 2018, there were reports that Anne Hathaway was considered for a role in the film, but she declined due to a scheduling conflict. Hugh Jackman was also offered a role by Hooper but turned it down. In July 2018, Jennifer Hudson, Taylor Swift, James Corden, and Ian McKellen joined the cast. Swift had previously tested for the role of Éponine in Tom Hooper's Les Misérables but was given the part of Bombalurina without an audition.

In September 2018, Laurie Davidson and Mette Towley were cast, with Steven Spielberg announced to be executive producing. In October 2018, Idris Elba and Judi Dench joined the cast of the film. Dench was cast in the original stage musical, but had been forced to pull out due to a torn Achilles tendon; Lloyd Webber and Hooper made Old Deuteronomy a female cat and offered her the role.

In November 2018, ballet dancers Francesca Hayward and Steven McRae, and Rebel Wilson, Jason Derulo and Robert Fairchild joined the cast of the film, with rehearsals commencing at Leavesden Studios in Hertfordshire, England. Andy Blankenbuehler choreographed the film, after Wayne McGregor was forced to back out due to scheduling conflicts. Blankenbuehler also choreographed the stage musical's 2016 Broadway revival. In December 2018, Les Twins and Eric Underwood joined the cast.

=== Filming ===
Principal photography began on 12 December 2018 and wrapped on 2 April 2019. Swift said that the cast attended "cat school", in which "We would literally do hours on end of barefoot crawling on the floor, hissing at each other. We learned about cat instincts and the way they carry themselves and the way that they process information, the way they see the world, the way they move."

=== Music ===
Music for the film was composed by Andrew Lloyd Webber with contributions from producer Greg Wells, who was initially brought in after production in mid-2019. The recordings were created partly at Abbey Road Studios with contributions from the London Symphony Orchestra. Wells also played a number of instruments on the music himself, including the drums, pipe organ, bass guitar and Abbey Road's fabled Mrs Mills piano, used in Beatles songs such as "Penny Lane" and "With a Little Help from My Friends".

A "highlights" edition of the soundtrack with a running time of 59 minutes was released on 20 December 2019 by Polydor Records and in the US by Republic Records. The song "Beautiful Ghosts" by Taylor Swift, a single from the soundtrack album, was released on 15 November 2019.

Less than two months before the film was scheduled to be released in theatres, production was still ongoing for its music.

==== Musical numbers ====
- "Overture"/"Prologue: Jellicle Songs for Jellicle Cats" – Orchestra/Company
- "The Naming of Cats"/"The Invitation to the Jellicle Ball"† – Munkustrap, Mr. Mistoffelees & Company
- "Jennyanydots: The Old Gumbie Cat" – Jennyanydots, Munkustrap & Company
- "The Rum Tum Tugger" – Rum Tum Tugger, Jennyanydots & Company
- "Grizabella: The Glamour Cat"† – Grizabella, Cassandra, Demeter & Company
- "Bustopher Jones: The Cat About Town" – Bustopher, Rum Tum Tugger, Maitre D' & Company
- "Mungojerrie and Rumpleteazer" – Mungojerrie, Rumpleteazer & Victoria
- "Growltiger's Last Stand"† – Growltiger
- "Old Deuteronomy" – Munkustrap, Old Deuteronomy & Company
- "The Jellicle Ball"† – Company
- "Memory (Prelude)"/"Beautiful Ghosts" – Grizabella & Victoria
- "The Moments of Happiness"† – Old Deuteronomy
- "Gus: The Theatre Cat" – Gus
- "Skimbleshanks: The Railway Cat" – Skimbleshanks, Munkustrap & Company
- "Macavity: The Mystery Cat" – Bombalurina, Macavity, Mungojerrie, Rumpleteazer, Griddlebone & Company
- "Mr. Mistoffelees" – Mistoffelees, Munkustrap & Company
- "Memory" – Grizabella & Victoria
- "Beautiful Ghosts (Reprise)"† – Victoria & Old Deuteronomy
- "The Journey to the Heaviside Layer"† – Company
- "Finale: The Ad-Dressing of Cats" – Old Deuteronomy & Company

† denotes songs absent from the soundtrack.

=== Visual effects ===
Cats uses extensive visual effects (VFX) throughout to convert the live-action actors into anthropomorphic cats via computer-generated imagery (CGI). However, the production originally intended to use makeup and costumes with fur for the characters. Hooper experimented with using prosthetics to create the look of the cats due to the then-prohibitive costs of VFX, but he was dissatisfied, feeling that "[Y]ou ended up with full-faced prosthetics where you lost so much emotion. ... So all the paths seemed to lead me back to visual effects." When production moved to digital options, companies like Technicolor SA subsidiaries Mill Film and MPC joined in for the visual effects. To aid this, the actors performed in motion capture suits with tracking dots on their costumes and faces. The bodies of the cat characters were rendered using CGI with digital fur blended with the actors' actual faces.

In an interview with The Daily Beast, a VFX editor who worked on the movie confirmed that an early, half-finished iteration of Cats featured visible anuses. Another crew member is quoted as saying that the appearance was not intentional. Rather, it was the result of the film's "unique visual effects". Ultimately, one crew member was assigned the task of editing out anything that appeared to be an anus.

Substantial work on the VFX for Cats was performed at Mill Film Montreal and Adelaide. The Daily Beast reported a troubled production; sources within one VFX studio said that staff had to work 80–90 hour weeks to finish the effects by the release date, and Hooper would send denigrating emails to individual VFX artists about their work and insult them during conferences. The VFX process was reportedly hindered by Hooper's rejection of the usual CGI workflow: rather than viewing partially-rendered "playblasts" of scenes to check movement before fine details such as lighting and fur were added, he demanded costly and time-consuming full renders before reviewing scenes, and told crews that real-life references of cats must be used for every movement, which someone had to point out was impossible because "cats don't dance." The team spent six months producing the film's two-minute trailer, leaving just four months to finish the entire 110-minute film. The film's visuals were completed just hours before its premiere.

At the 92nd Academy Awards, Corden and Wilson appeared in character as Bustopher Jones and Jennyanydots, mocking the film's CGI while presenting Best Visual Effects. This led to criticism from the production's VFX animators, many of whom were laid off when Mill Film Montreal and MPC Vancouver closed following the film's production, as well as condemnation by the Visual Effects Society, an organisation representing the VFX industry. The film's visual effects were also mocked in the 2022 Disney film Chip 'n' Dale: Rescue Rangers, in a scene where the titular characters notice two alley cats resembling the ones in the film as they venture through an "uncanny valley" part of town.

== Release ==
The film premiered at Alice Tully Hall at the Lincoln Center in New York City on 16 December 2019 and was theatrically released in the United Kingdom and United States on 20 December 2019.

=== Marketing ===
On 6 April 2019, Hudson performed "Memory" at the Las Vegas CinemaCon, along with a behind-the-scenes look with the film's cast and crew. On 17 July 2019, Universal released a behind-the-scenes featurette detailing the various aspects of production and featuring interviews with the cast and crew.

The first trailer was released on 18 July 2019, and received overwhelmingly negative reactions from viewers. Many viewers were unsettled by the mix of CGI and live-action used to portray the cats, and cited the effects as an example of the uncanny valley, with some comparing it unfavourably to the design of Sonic in the first trailer of the then-upcoming film Sonic the Hedgehog, which sparked similar criticism that ultimately resulted in the character being redesigned and the film being delayed. The studio spent about $115 million on global promotions and advertisements.

=== Home media ===
Cats was released online on 17 March 2020, and on Blu-ray and DVD on 7 April in the United States. The film was released on 29 April 2020 in Australia and on 1 June 2020 in the United Kingdom.

=== CGI errors and modified release ===
The film's original release contained numerous CGI errors and glitches, such as one scene in which Judi Dench's human hand, complete with her wedding ring, appears instead of Old Deuteronomy's cat paw. After poor reviews, Universal notified cinemas on opening day that an updated Digital Cinema Package with "some improved visual effects" would be available for download on 22 December, urging them to replace the current print as soon as possible. Studio executives and cinema owners said that the decision to release a modified version of a film already in wide release was "unheard of".

== Reception ==
=== Box office ===
Cats grossed $27.2 million in the United States and Canada, and $51.2 million in other territories, for a worldwide total of $78.4 million against a production budget of about $95 million. Deadline Hollywood calculated the net loss of the film to be $113.6 million.

In the United States and Canada, Cats was initially projected to gross $15–20 million in its opening weekend. Universal hoped that the film would appeal to young women as counterprogramming against Star Wars: The Rise of Skywalker, and emphasised Swift in marketing. After making $2.6 million on its opening day (including $550,000 from Thursday night previews), estimates for Cats were lowered to $7 million. Ultimately, the film only debuted to $6.5 million, finishing fourth at the box office. The poor performance was attributed to negative reception of the trailers, poor reviews and competition from The Rise of Skywalker.

In its second weekend, Cats made $4.8 million (for a total of $8.7 million over the five-day Christmas period), finishing in eighth place. It then made $2.6 million in its third weekend, finishing tenth.

=== Critical response ===
The review aggregator website Rotten Tomatoes reported that 19% of critics gave the film a positive review based on 334 reviews, with an average rating of 3.9/10. The site's critics consensus reads: "Despite its fur-midable cast, this Cats adaptation is a clawful mistake that will leave most viewers begging to be put out of their mew-sery." On review aggregator Metacritic, the film has a weighted average score of 32 out of 100 based on 51 critics, indicating "generally unfavorable" reviews. Audiences polled by CinemaScore gave the film an average grade of "C+" on an A+ to F scale, while those at PostTrak gave it an average 0.5 out of 5 stars, with 30% saying they would definitely recommend it.

Peter Debruge of Variety called the film "one of those once-in-a-blue-moon embarrassments that mars the résumés of great actors (poor Idris Elba, already scarred enough as the villainous Macavity) and trips up the careers of promising newcomers (like ballerina Francesca Hayward, whose wide-eyed, mouth-agape Victoria displays one expression for the entire movie)." He criticized the direction and effects, and particularly predicted that the film would appeal to the furry fandom, though many in the furry fandom also found the effects disturbing.

David Rooney of The Hollywood Reporter felt that the film was "hobbled by a major misjudgment in its central visual concept", lamenting its execution (such as the poor proportions of the "cats" to their environments) and deeming the film "exhausting". Peter Travers of Rolling Stone rated the film zero stars out of five, stating it was "bizarre", had terrible special effects, and made the audience "want to cry for mercy", while Hooper "traps the actors in an airless, lifeless bubble of a film that scarcely gives them room to breathe, much less develop a character".

In the Los Angeles Times, Justin Chang wrote: "With its grotesque design choices and busy, metronomic editing, Cats is as uneasy on the eyes as a Hollywood spectacle can be, tumbling into an uncanny valley between mangy realism and dystopian artifice." Debruge said that the film should have used "face paint and Lycra" like the musical.

Simran Hans of The Observer agreed that "many of its uncanny images are sure to haunt viewers for generations". Her one-star review described the film as "a clear career low" for most of the actors, wondering whether they "are aware of what they've gotten themselves into". Peter Bradshaw for The Guardian agreed with the one-star rating. In a review parodying "The Naming of Cats", he criticised the visual style and particularly the character design, while lambasting the film as a "dreadful hairball of woe".

Manohla Dargis of The New York Times felt that Hooper had made "a robust effort" to adapt the stage musical—which "was always going to be difficult, particularly once the decision was made to create a live-action version rather than an animated one"—and "enlisted some talented performers", but that the film version suffered from a lack of the human connection that theatre involves, where performers and audience share a space, without which "all that's left are canned images of fit-looking people meowing and raising their rumps high in the air".

The Hollywood Reporter named Cats one of the ten worst films of 2019, Travers said it "easily scores as the bottom of the 2019 barrel—and arguably of the decade", and Adam Graham of The Detroit News said "Cats is the biggest disaster of the decade, and possibly thus far in the millennium. It's Battlefield Earth with whiskers." Alex Cranz of io9 warned: "I have seen sights no human should see" but said others "must witness" Hooper's, the actors', and Hollywood's hubris, citing a human being appearing in a group of cats, a cat-coloured woman without fur, and other examples of how "the shit's just not finished." Ty Burr of The Boston Globe's half-star review said "there are moments in Cats I would gladly pay to unsee" and warned small children to not watch the film. He reported that the preview audience laughed like the reaction to Springtime for Hitler during Dench's "The Ad-dressing of Cats", because each pause in her lyrics seemed to be the end of the film ("at long last") before continuing. Patrick Gibbs of SLUG said: "There is not enough kitty litter in the world to cover up this mess."

Pete Hammond of Deadline complimented Taylor Swift's performance as Bombalurina and her signature "Macavity" number, as well as "Beautiful Ghosts", which she wrote along with Lloyd Webber. Patrick Ryan of USA Today stated that Swift "makes the most of her brief screen time, bringing her unabating charisma to the flirtatious feline ... if there's one thing that's disappointing about Swift's performance, it's that there isn't more of it". Hans said that she was the only actor "who seems to be having fun, perhaps because she only appears in the film for approximately 10 minutes." Jennifer Hudson similarly received praise for her rendition of "Memory", with some critics describing it as "the best part" of the film and "the sole musical number in the new movie that summons real feeling".

Edward Douglas of The Beat described the film as "the worst thing to happen to cats since dogs." This was later quoted by Ricky Gervais while hosting the 2020 Golden Globe Awards.

Lloyd Webber was critical of the film, calling it "ridiculous" in an interview with The Sunday Times, saying: "The problem with the film was that Tom Hooper decided that he didn't want anybody involved in it who was involved in the original show." He later revealed in an interview with The Daily Telegraph: "I wrote to the head of Universal and said, 'You've got a car crash on your hands unless you get a grip on this thing', a year before they made (it). I didn't even get a reply." In a 2021 interview with Variety, Lloyd Webber claimed his negative reaction to the film had even directly inspired him to adopt a Havanese dog.

In a 2024 interview with the Kingdom of Dreams podcast, Simon Wells, who was previously set to direct the animated film adaptation for Amblimation, said that the live action version had "a lot of things about it that are not good. Other people took it on and they didn't really fare much better". A. S. Hamrah of The New York Review of Books wrote in 2025 that "Universal ... didn’t know that they had produced the worst film of the year, maybe the worst of the decade, maybe the worst ever". The studio provided an open bar for critics after the New York preview screening but, he recalled, they were so appalled that no one went to it: "Writers turning down free drinks. Another ominous sign for the new year".

=== Accolades ===
On 26 December 2019, it was reported that Universal had removed Cats from its For Your Consideration web page. The film was not available on the Academy of Motion Picture Arts and Sciences' private streaming media platform for award contenders.

Awards and nominations for Cats
Award	Date of ceremony	Category	Recipients	Result
Dorian Awards	2020	Campiest Flick of the Year	Cats	Won
Golden Globe Awards	5 January 2020	Best Original Song	"Beautiful Ghosts" – Music and Lyrics by Taylor Swift and Andrew Lloyd Webber	Nominated
Golden Raspberry Awards	16 March 2020	Worst Picture	Debra Hayward, Tim Bevan, Eric Fellner and Tom Hooper	Won
Golden Raspberry Awards	16 March 2020	Worst Director	Tom Hooper	Won
Golden Raspberry Awards	16 March 2020	Worst Actress	Francesca Hayward	Nominated
Golden Raspberry Awards	16 March 2020	Worst Supporting Actor	James Corden	Won
Golden Raspberry Awards	16 March 2020	Worst Supporting Actress	Judi Dench	Nominated
Golden Raspberry Awards	16 March 2020	Worst Supporting Actress	Rebel Wilson	Won
Golden Raspberry Awards	16 March 2020	Worst Screenplay	Lee Hall and Tom Hooper; Based on the musical by Andrew Lloyd Webber, which was based on Old Possum's Book of Practical Cats by T. S. Eliot	Won
Golden Raspberry Awards	16 March 2020	Worst Screen Combo	Any two half-feline/half-human hairballs	Won
Golden Raspberry Awards	16 March 2020	Worst Screen Combo	Jason Derulo and his CGI-neutered "bulge"	Nominated
Golden Reel Awards	2020	Outstanding Achievement in Sound Editing – Musical for Feature Film	John Warhurst, Nina Hartstone, Victor Chaga, Cecile Tournesac and James Shirley	Nominated
Grammy Awards	14 March 2021	Best Song Written for Visual Media	"Beautiful Ghosts" – Music and Lyrics by Taylor Swift and Andrew Lloyd Webber	Nominated
Huading Awards	2020	Best Global Film Theme Song	"Beautiful Ghosts" – Music and Lyrics by Taylor Swift and Andrew Lloyd Webber	Nominated
Nickelodeon Kids' Choice Awards	2 May 2020	Favorite Movie Actress	Taylor Swift	Nominated

== See also ==
- List of films considered the worst
