= Bombalurina =

Character from the Andrew Lloyd Webber musical "Cats"

- Rosemarie Ford as Bombalurina in Cats
- First appearance: Old Possum's Book of Practical Cats
- Created by: T. S. Eliot
- Portrayed by: See below

In-universe information
- Species: Cat
- Gender: Female

Bombalurina is a principal character in the Andrew Lloyd Webber musical Cats. The musical is an adaptation of T. S. Eliot's 1939 poetry book Old Possum's Book of Practical Cats, and the character's name is given in the poem "The Naming of Cats". Bombalurina is a flirtatious, confident female and mischievous cat with a distinct red coat. The role was originated by Geraldine Gardner in the West End in 1981, and by Donna King on Broadway in 1982. In the 2019 film adaptation, she is played by Taylor Swift.

== Character description ==
Bombalurina is a self-assured and generally well-meaning adult cat. She can be mean at times, particularly towards Grizabella initially, though she later comes to accept her. She is best friends with Demeter and often watches out for her troubled friend; they also share a hatred for the villainous Macavity. Bombalurina flirts with many male cats, particularly Rum Tum Tugger who rejects her during his musical number, but later relents and dances with her at the ball.

The role of Bombalurina is dance-heavy and usually calls for a mezzo-soprano range with a high belt.

=== Appearance ===
Bombalurina is usually depicted as a beautiful and tall cat; she wears a spiked collar and her coat is red with black spots and a white chest.

== Songs ==
She sings "The Gumbie Cat" with Demeter and Jellylorum. She has a small solo in "Rum Tum Tugger". She also appears in "Grizabella the Glamour Cat" with Demeter again, and "Bustopher Jones" with Jennyanydots and Jellylorum. Her biggest singing part is in "Macavity", which she sings with Demeter towards the end of the musical. (In the original version, she sings this by herself.)

== Notable casting ==
The role of Bombalurina was originated by Geraldine Gardner in the original West End production in 1981, and by Donna King in the original Broadway production in 1982. When King left the show, the role was taken over by Marlene Danielle who would continue to play the role for the rest of the show's 18-year run on Broadway. On screen, Bombalurina was portrayed by Rosemarie Ford in the 1998 film version of the musical, and by Taylor Swift in the 2019 film adaptation.

== See also ==
- Bombalurina, a band by Lloyd Webber (among others) named after the character

== Print sources ==
- Eliot, T. S.; Eliot, Valerie; Lloyd Webber, Andrew; Nunn, Trevor; Lynne, Gillian; Napier, John (1983). Cats: The Book of the Musical. Harvest Books. ISBN 978-0156155823.
- Sternfeld, Jessica (2006). The Megamusical. Indiana University Press. ISBN 978-0-253-34793-0.
