= Macavity =

- Bryn Walters as Macavity in the 1998 film version of Cats.
- First appearance: Old Possum's Book of Practical Cats; 5 October 1939
- Created by: T. S. Eliot
- Adapted by: Andrew Lloyd Webber
- Portrayed by: John Thornton, Ken Ard, Bryn Walters, Idris Elba

In-universe information
- Full name: Macavity the Mystery Cat
- Alias: Hidden Paw
- Nickname: Napoleon of Crime
- Species: Cat
- Occupation: Criminal; Con artist
- Origin: England

Macavity the Mystery Cat, also called the Hidden Paw, is a fictional character and the main antagonist of T. S. Eliot's 1939 poetry book Old Possum's Book of Practical Cats. He also appears in the Andrew Lloyd Webber 1981 musical Cats, which is based on Eliot's book. Macavity is a cunning criminal and con artist; he possesses mystical powers and is the antagonist of the musical.

== Origins and etymology ==
T. S. Eliot was a big fan of the Sherlock Holmes stories by Arthur Conan Doyle and the character of Macavity is a literary allusion to Professor Moriarty, the criminal mastermind in the Sherlock series. Evidence that Macavity was based on Moriarty was first presented by H.T. Webster and H.W. Starr in 1954, and later rediscovered by Katharine Loesch. Stephen Fry has told of a paper he later presented to the Sherlock Holmes Society of London as a teenage schoolboy, about the parallels between Macavity and Moriarty; he has since realised 'it was hardly news', and he had discovered no great literary secret.

In a letter to Frank Morley, Eliot wrote, "I have done a new cat modeled on the late Professor Moriarty, but he doesn't seem very popular; too sophisticated perhaps." The name "Macavity" is thus a pun on "Moriarty". The word 'cavity' also implies a hole or void or absence of something, and Macavity is described in the poem as being "not there" at the time or location of any crime.

== Poem ==
Beginning:
Macavity's a Mystery Cat: he's called the Hidden Paw -
For he's the master criminal who can defy the Law.
He's the bafflement of Scotland Yard, the Flying Squad's despair:
For when they reach the scene of crime – Macavity's not there!

End:
And they say that all the Cats whose wicked deeds are widely known
(I might mention Mungojerrie, I might mention Griddlebone)
Are nothing more than agents for the Cat who all the time
Just controls their operations: the Napoleon of Crime!

— T. S. Eliot, "Macavity: The Mystery Cat", Old Possum's Book of Practical Cats

The poem "Macavity the Mystery Cat" is the best known of Eliot's Old Possum's Book of Practical Cats, the only book Eliot wrote for a younger audience. The poem is considered particularly suitable reading for 11 and 12-year-olds. Although originally published as part of a collection of poems, "Macavity the Mystery Cat" was published as a standalone book by Faber and Faber in 2015.

In the poem, Macavity is a master criminal who is too clever to leave any evidence of his guilt. His nicknames include: the Mystery Cat, the Hidden Paw, and the Napoleon of Crime. Similarly, Sherlock Holmes describes Moriarty as "the Napoleon of Crime" in The Adventure of the Final Problem and a "Napoleon gone wrong" in The Valley of Fear.

According to the poem, even when the Secret Service decides that Macavity was behind a loss, they are unable to apprehend him, as "he's a mile away", "...[or] engaged in doing complicated long division sums". Doyle wrote that Moriarty "is never caught" as at the moment of the crime he is probably "working out problems on a blackboard ten miles away" (The Adventure of the Final Problem). Macavity is described as being a ginger cat who is very tall and thin with sunken eyes, and "sways his head from side to side with movements like a snake". The poem also says: "His brow is deeply lined in thought, his head is highly domed; His coat is dusty from neglect, his whiskers are uncombed." Once again, this description is a close parallel to that of Professor Moriarty:

His appearance was quite familiar to me. He is extremely tall and thin, his forehead domes out in a white curve, and his two eyes are deeply sunken in his head...his face protrudes forward and is forever oscillating from side to side in a curiously reptilian fashion.

— The Adventure of the Final Problem

The poem accuses Macavity of misbehaviour that would be within the capabilities of an ordinary cat, such as stealing milk, but also holds him responsible for major crimes. He is referred to as a "fiend in feline shape, a monster of depravity" and has been suspected of stifling Pekes, vandalism, theft, cheating at cards, espionage and controlling an organised crime ring with Mungojerrie, Rumpleteazer and Griddlebone among the members. Holmes in Doyle's narrative describes Moriarty as "the organizer of half that is evil and of nearly all that is undetected in this great city."

Webster and Starr assumed that Eliot referred to the cases of Mr. Joseph Harrison (The Adventure of the Naval Treaty) and Herr Hugo Oberstein (The Adventure of the Bruce-Partington Plans) when he wrote in the poem – "And when the Foreign Office finds a Treaty's gone astray,/ And the admiralty loses some plans and drawings by the way".

Macavity's "powers of levitation would make a fakir stare", as he "breaks the law of gravity".

== Musical ==
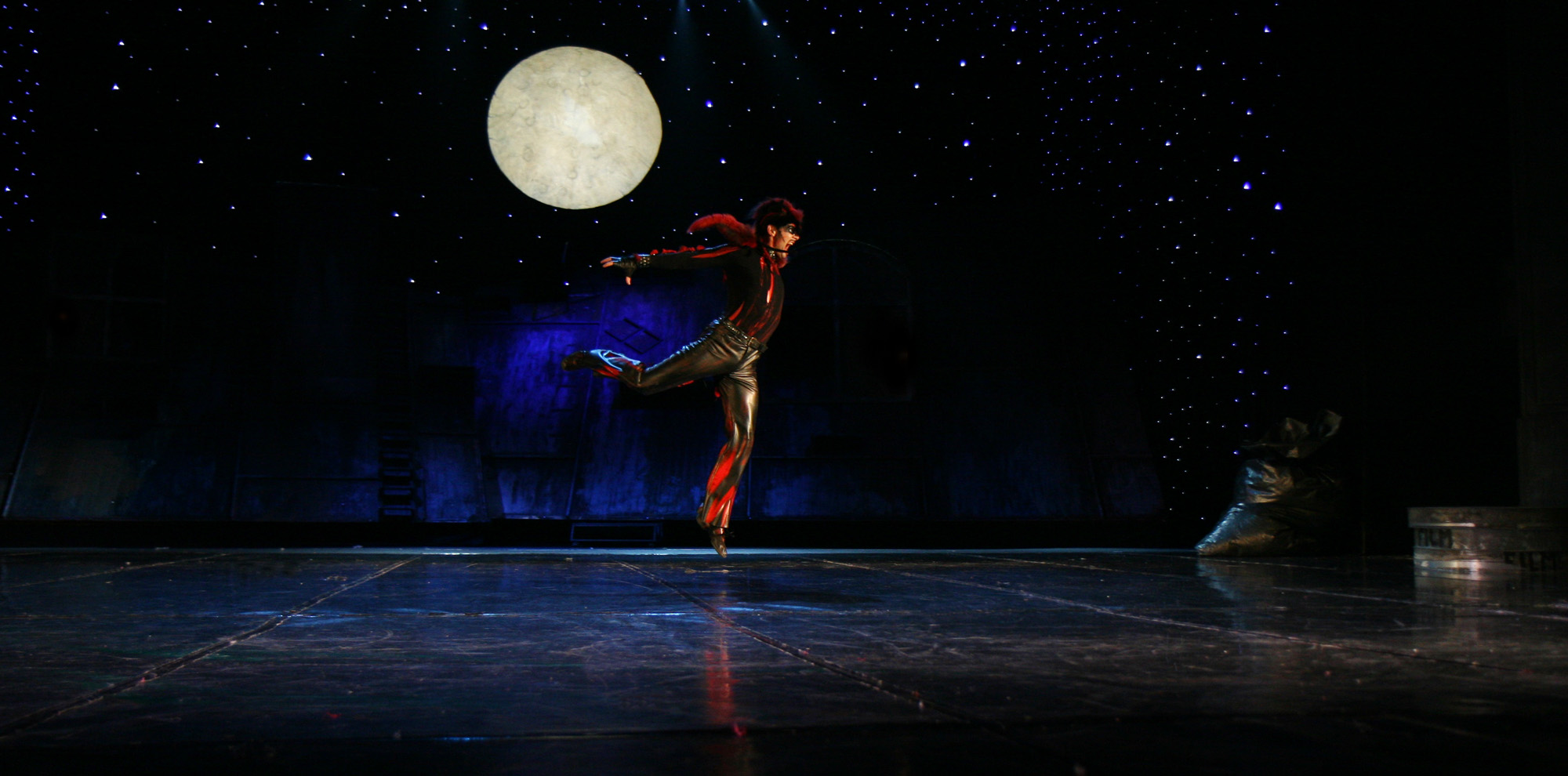
Grzegorz Suski as Macavity in the non-replica production of Cats in Roma Musical Theatre in Warsaw, 9 November 2007

Macavity is considered to be the only real villain in the musical Cats by Andrew Lloyd Webber. He kidnaps Old Deuteronomy, the Jellicle leader, and attempts to abduct Demeter, one of two cats who sing about him. Lloyd Webber noted that "Macavity... is obviously a take-off on Moriarty." The character was originally played by Richard Pettyfer in the original West End production, Kenneth Ard in the Broadway production, Bryn Walters in the Cats 1998 film adaptation, and Idris Elba in the 2019 film adaptation of the musical.

Within the storyline of the musical, Macavity makes several attempts to scare the tribe. This culminates in his abduction of Old Deuteronomy, after which two queen cats, Bombalurina and Demeter, sing about him. He then returns disguised as Old Deuteronomy, but is unmasked by Demeter. Munkustrap and Alonzo come to her defense and, in a dramatic cat fight, battle him. Confronted and surrounded by other tribe members, he manages to escape. As seen in the film production and most stage performances, he appears to be capable of performing some form of hypnosis. When Demeter and Bombalurina (a flirty queen cat who is close friends with Demeter) sing about him, they do so in a sensuous manner, suggesting he is more familiar to them. The Macavity number develops from a bluesy duet into a big female ensemble routine.

Macavity is typically depicted as a cat with a chaotic array of red, orange, white, and sharp black stripes. He is often portrayed with very long claws and wild dark hair. The role of Macavity is usually played by the same actor as Plato (a chorus cat who notably does a pas de deux with Victoria during the Jellicle Ball). His costume is ginger and white, and specifically includes a simple make-up design that the actor transforms into the elaborate Macavity make-up, and then re-applies after the featured scene. Admetus/Plato is also often recognisable as one of the tallest cast members, as the fight scene between Macavity and Munkustrap requires him to be able to lift other male dancers.

== Film ==
In the film Cats (2019), Macavity is played by Idris Elba. This version has a major role as a deranged villain with the intent of getting to the Heaviside Layer by any means. Throughout the film, he kidnaps all the other contestants so that he can be made the Jellicle choice by default.

== In popular culture ==
Mystery Readers International presents the Macavity Awards annually in several categories, including Best Mystery Novel, Best First Mystery Novel, Best Bio/Critical Mystery Work, Best Mystery Short Story.

Polish author Maciej Wojtyszko's children's books feature a character named Macavity the Cat (polish Kot Makawity), a criminal mastermind who loses a chess duel with animal detective Kajetan Chrumps and is then persuaded to become Chrumps' assistant.

In the 1976 movie Logan's Run, Peter Ustinov's character says, "You're full of secrets as Macavity" and then quotes from the poem.

Gillian Robert's schoolteacher detective Amanda Pepper has an elderly male companion cat whose métier seems to be relaxation. The following books by Roberts feature Macavity the cat: Claire and Present Danger (2003), Helen Hath No Fury (2001), Adam and Evil (1999), The Bluest Blood (1998), The Mummer's Curse (1996), How I Spent My Summer Vacation (1995), In the Dead of Summer (1995), With Friends Like These… (1993), I'd Rather Be in Philadelphia (1992), Philly Stakes (1989), Caught Dead in Philadelphia (1987).

In 1995, New Jersey punk band Gimp released an album called Smiles for Macavity.

Former British Prime Minister Gordon Brown, when still Chancellor of the Exchequer, was likened to Macavity by Liberal Democrat Shadow Leader of the House, David Heath, who labelled Brown "the Macavity of the Cabinet" when talking about tax credits during Business Questions on 23 June 2005. Lord Turnbull echoed this two years later, opining that "the chancellor has a Macavity quality. He is not there when there is dirty work to be done."

After Harold Pinter received the 2005 Nobel Prize in Literature, Mary Liddell of The Guardian said: "Pinter has become the Macavity of English letters".

Macavity is the name given by several bus drivers from the West Midlands, England to a white odd-eyed cat which, since January 2007, has been observed to regularly use the local bus service on its own. Macavity's fur is reported to be completely white, he has a green left eye and a blue right eye, and he wears a purple collar. His owner and true name are unknown.
