= The Awefull Battle of the Pekes and the Pollicles =

Poem of cats

(Of) The Awefull Battle of the Pekes and the Pollicles
- (Together with Some Account of the Participation of the Pugs and the Poms and the Intervention of the Great Rumpus Cat)
- by T. S. Eliot
- First published in: 1939

"The Awefull Battle of the Pekes and the Pollicles"

Song
- Released: 1981
- Genre: Musical theatre
- Songwriter(s): Composer: Andrew Lloyd Webber; Lyricist: T. S. Eliot

"(Of) The Awefull Battle of the Pekes and the Pollicles" (Together with Some Account of the Participation of the Pugs and the Poms and the Intervention of the Great Rumpus Cat) is a poem by T. S. Eliot included in Old Possum's Book of Practical Cats, his 1939 book of light verse. It is also included in Andrew Lloyd Webber's 1981 musical Cats, which is an adaptation of the book.

== Poem ==
"(Of) The Awefull Battle of the Pekes and the Pollicles" was first published on 5 October 1939 in T. S. Eliot's Old Possum's Book of Practical Cats. Dogs are treated as "gullible simpletons" in the book and this particular poem revolves around a public commotion caused by warring dogs. Eliot specifically mentions "Pollicle Dogs" to be Yorkshire Terriers in the poem as a reference to his first wife's dog Polly.

The word "Pollicle Dog" is derived from a corruption of the phrase "poor little dog". Similarly, "Jellicle Cat" is a corruption of "dear little cat".

== Cats ==
In Cats, "The Awefull Battle of the Pekes and the Pollicles" is performed in the time signature 6/8 as part of a play within the musical. It is sung by Munkustrap and describes a legendary battle between two neighbouring dog tribes, the Pekes and the Pollicles, who bark "until you could hear them all over the park". Two more dog tribes, the Pugs and the Poms, eventually join in the barking as well. This goes on until the Great Rumpus Cat arrives and scares the dogs away. As Munkustrap narrates, the other cats act out the tale by using items from the junkyard to dress up as the dogs. The play is interrupted at several moments by the antics of Rum Tum Tugger.
