= Memory (Cats song) =

Song written for the 1981 musical Cats

Song by Andrew Lloyd Webber

from the album Cats: Complete Original Broadway Cast Recording
- Released: 1981
- Genre: Show tune
- Composer: Andrew Lloyd Webber
- Lyricist: Trevor Nunn

"Memory" is a show tune composed by Andrew Lloyd Webber, with lyrics by Trevor Nunn based on poems by T. S. Eliot. It was written for the 1981 musical Cats, where it is sung primarily by the character Grizabella as a melancholic remembrance of her glamorous past and as a plea for acceptance. "Memory" is the climax of the musical and by far its best-known song, having achieved mainstream success outside of the musical. According to musicologist Jessica Sternfeld, writing in 2006, it is "by some estimations the most successful song ever from a musical".

Elaine Paige originated the role of Grizabella in the West End production of Cats and was thus the first to perform the song publicly on stage. "Memory" was named the Best Song Musically and Lyrically at the 1982 Ivor Novello Awards. In 2020, Jessie Thompson and Zoe Paskett of the Evening Standard wrote: "Paige's version set the standard and enabled Memory to become one of the most recognisable musical theatre songs of all time."

== Context ==
In Cats, "Memory" is sung primarily by Grizabella, a one-time "glamour cat" who has fallen on hard times and is now only a shell of her former self. For most of the musical, Grizabella is ostracized by her fellow Jellicle cats. She sings a prelude version of "Memory" at the end of the first act, recalling the time before she became an outcast.

Melodic fragments of "Memory" are then sung twice in a higher D major key by Jemima (also known as Sillabub), a young cat who is sympathetic to Grizabella's plight. The first instance occurs at the beginning of the second act after "The Moments of Happiness", and the second instance occurs near the end of the second act right before Grizabella's final appearance. As Grizabella returns near the end of the musical, she sings the full version of the song as she pleads for acceptance, with Jemima joining in briefly to urge her on.

== Conception and composition ==
Andrew Lloyd Webber originally composed the tune for a proposed Giacomo Puccini project that he later abandoned. Although the tune was intentionally written in the style of Puccini, Lloyd Webber was concerned that he had unknowingly lifted it from one of Puccini's own works. He asked his father, a noted expert on Puccini, for his opinion on whether it sounded like one of the composer's works; according to Lloyd Webber, his father responded: "It sounds like a million dollars!" Prior to its inclusion in Cats, the composition had also been earmarked for his early draft of Sunset Boulevard.

The widow of Larry Clinton claimed that "Memory" was based on Clinton's "Bolero in Blue", which in turn was based on Maurice Ravel's Boléro. Musicologist John Snelson dismissed this claim, however, noting the difference in the phrasing between Boléro and "Memory": the former is long and continuous, while the latter is centered on a repeated tone and a "turnlike figure" to emphasize said tone. Snelson further argues that the chord progression (I-vi-IV-iii) and time signature (12/8) in "Memory" are more akin to popular music of the time, suggesting an origin completely different from Boléro.

Cats is based on a 1939 book of poems by T. S. Eliot, Old Possum's Book of Practical Cats, and the lyrics for "Memory" were adapted from Eliot's poems "Rhapsody on a Windy Night" and "Preludes" by the musical's director Trevor Nunn. Lloyd Webber's former writing partners Don Black and Tim Rice had also each submitted a lyric to the show's producers for consideration, although Nunn's version was favoured. Elaine Paige was given a different lyric to sing to the tune of "Memory" every night during previews for Cats.

There are three key changes in "Memory" so as to keep the song within the comfortable range for a chest voice. It starts off in the key of B♭ major, switches to G♭ major as Grizabella collapses, then changes again to D♭ major for the climax. Lloyd Webber and Nunn wrote two versions of the song: one for the stage production and another for a single that Elaine Paige recorded. In the stage version, the second bridge of the song is sung an octave higher by the kitten Jemima, with Grizabella joining her for the second half of said bridge; the reasoning was that the low pitch (as sung by Grizabella in the single) would be difficult to hear in the live theatre setting and moreover, this duet would allow for a visual contrast between the innocent young kitten and the fallen Grizabella in the stage show. The stage version also features a different first verse (sung by Grizabella), the second bridge repositioned as the first bridge, a shortened break and a different second bridge as it was felt that a kitten would not sing about the same hard times as Grizabella.

The first commercial release of "Memory" was an instrumental single performed by guitarist Gary Moore. It was released in early 1981 by MCA Records to promote Cats while the musical was still in development. Paige heard this version driving home one evening and rushed into the house to record it from the radio, vowing to contact Lloyd Webber to insist on recording a vocal version of it. Before she was able to do so, the following morning he rang her to ask whether she would, at short notice, replace the injured Judi Dench as Grizabella in the London production of Cats. Paige later recalled that the opportunity to sing "Memory" was the principal reason for agreeing.

In the 2019 film adaptation featuring Jennifer Hudson as Grizabella, Jemima's soprano part was given to Victoria the White Cat.

== Elaine Paige version ==
Elaine Paige, who originated the role of Grizabella in the West End production of Cats, released a version of the song that was a Top 10 hit in the UK, peaking at No. 6 on the UK Singles Chart in July 1981. The single recording was incorporated into the original London cast recording of the musical. Paige's first recording of her version, in which she sings the line "all alone with the memory" as "all alone with my memory", surfaced on the compilation album The Premiere Collection: The Best of Andrew Lloyd Webber.

She re-recorded the song in 1998 for the video release of the musical. This version, featuring the theatre lyrics, reached #36 in the UK Singles Chart in October of that year. Paige also recorded a version for her 1983 album Stages, produced by Tony Visconti. Live performances of "Memory", which is considered her signature song, are featured on her albums Performance, Live: Celebrating A Life On Stage, and I'm Still Here: Live at the Royal Albert Hall. She also performed the song for Andrew Lloyd Webber's 50th birthday concert, released on DVD as Andrew Lloyd Webber: Celebration, for the first Chinese concerts of his work, released on DVD as Andrew Lloyd Webber: Masterpiece. Paige sang it for the recording of This is Your Life (1994) focused on the composer, and the BBC's concert for his 60th birthday in Hyde Park, London, which was filmed but, as of 2024, has never been broadcast.

== Notable cover versions ==
"Memory" has been covered by numerous musical acts. By 2006, there were around 600 recorded versions of the song, ranging from easy listening to techno covers.

- Barry Manilow released a cover of "Memory" as a single in late 1982; it became the highest-charting version to date on the Billboard Hot 100 when it reached No. 39 in January 1983. Manilow's recording also made the Top 10 on the Billboard adult contemporary chart, reaching No. 8. This version is included on his album Here Comes the Night.
- In 2014, Nicole Scherzinger performed the song in the West End revival of Cats, and was nominated for an Olivier Award for her performance.

=== Barbra Streisand version ===
"Memory"

Single by Barbra Streisand

from the album Memories
- B-side: "Evergreen (Love Theme from A Star Is Born)"
- Released: February 1982
- Studio: Olympic Studios (London, England)
- Genre: Pop
- Length: 3:52
- Label: Columbia
- Songwriters: Andrew Lloyd Webber, T. S. Eliot, and Trevor Nunn
- Producer: Andrew Lloyd Webber

Barbra Streisand singles chronology
"Comin' In and Out of Your Life" (1981)	"Memory" (1982)	"The Way He Makes Me Feel" (1983)

Music video
- "Barbra Streisand - Memory (Official Video)" on YouTube

American singer, songwriter, actress and director Barbra Streisand recorded "Memory" (produced by Lloyd Webber himself) for her 1981 album Memories. When released as a single, Streisand's cover reached No. 52 on the Billboard Hot 100 chart and No. 9 on the Billboard adult contemporary chart in 1982. In the UK this version peaked at No. 34 the same year. The cover was also used in the 2023 superhero film The Marvels.

==== Charts ====
Chart (1981–1984)	Peak position
Austria (Ö3 Austria Top 40)	14
Canadian Adult Contemporary (RPM)	3
Finland (Suomen virallinen lista)	1
France (SNEP)	185
Netherlands (Single Top 100)	19
New Zealand (Recorded Music NZ)	4
South Africa (Springbok)	8
Sweden (Sverigetopplistan)	6
UK Singles (Official Charts)	34
US Billboard Hot 100	52
US Adult Contemporary (Billboard)	9
US Cash Box Top 100 Singles	48
West Germany (GfK)	30

Chart (2012)	Peak position
France (SNEP)	185

== Legacy ==
The song was used in a lip-sync on series 2 of RuPaul's Drag Race UK between contestants Tayce and Cherry Valentine in the second episode.
