= Rum Tum Tugger =

- Old Possum's Book of Practical Cats / Cats character
- Created by: T. S. Eliot
- Portrayed by: Paul Nicholas (musical; West End 1981); Terrence Mann (musical; Broadway 1982); John Partridge (1998 film); Andy Karl (musical; 4th US tour); Jason Derulo (2019 film)

In-universe information
- Species: Cat (Maine Coon)
- Gender: Male
- Affiliation: Jellicle cats

Rum Tum Tugger is one of the many feline characters in the 1939 poetry book Old Possum's Book of Practical Cats by T. S. Eliot, and in the 1981 musical Cats which is based on Eliot's book. Rum Tum Tugger is a rebellious Jellicle cat that loves to be the center of attention.

The role of Rum Tum Tugger was originated by Paul Nicholas on the West End in 1981, and by Terrence Mann on Broadway in 1982. In the 1998 video production, he was performed by John Partridge. Jason Derulo portrayed Rum Tum Tugger in the 2019 film adaptation.

== Origins ==
In T. S. Eliot's Old Possum's Book of Practical Cats, Rum Tum Tugger is described as a rebel cat that cannot help but be difficult. He is never satisfied with what you give him;

The Rum Tum Tugger is a Curious Cat:
If you offer him pheasant he would rather have grouse.
If you put him in a house he would much prefer a flat,
If you put him in a flat then he'd rather have a house.
If you set him on a mouse then he only wants a rat,
If you set him on a rat then he'd rather chase a mouse.

The Rum Tum Tugger is characterized as notoriously hard to please, constantly setting himself apart from others by deliberately doing the opposite of what is expected. By the end of the poem, the reader is left with the impression that he is deviously self-centered and takes pleasure in his contrarian nature. Performers playing this role are often described with the three words: "perverse, preening, and independent".

== Musical ==
=== Character ===
Rum Tum Tugger is a rebellious and unappeasable cat. He loves the limelight, while at the same time enjoys being seen as an individual by slightly separating himself from the tribe. Undeniably charismatic, the female kittens (Victoria, Etcetera, Electra and Jemima) are in awe of him, and he flirts openly with almost every female cat in the 1998 film adaptation (especially Bombalurina), though Demeter seems to deeply dislike him. He also flirts with Mr. Mistoffelees, even going so far as to sing a ballad about how talented he is. His older brother, the serious and responsible Munkustrap, has to frequently keep him in line. In his song, Tugger describes through several examples how he only wants what he can't have and never takes what he is offered. Therefore, it makes sense that he shows interest in Demeter and Mr. Mistoffelees, who are the only cats who are utterly unimpressed by him.

Rum Tum Tugger is often portrayed as a rock star type of cat, and Andrew Lloyd Webber has stated that part of the character is intended to be a homage to Mick Jagger of The Rolling Stones. In an attempt to modernize the show, Rum Tum Tugger was revamped into a street rapper in the 2014 West End revival.

The role is usually played by a rock tenor with a strong falsetto register.

As a major character part, Tugger is a principal singing role with several solos. He sings solo in his own song, "The Rum Tum Tugger", as well as "Magical Mr. Mistoffelees". He sings "Old Deuteronomy" with Munkustrap.

=== Appearance ===
Rum Tum Tugger is a black tomcat with leopard spots on his chest and a wild mane. He wears a spiked collar and a belt covered with silver rhinestones. His cat breed was said to be Maine Coon, because of his wild mane and being portrayed as much larger than the other cats.

=== Notable casting ===
The role of Rum Tum Tugger was originated by Paul Nicholas in the West End in 1981, and by Terrence Mann on Broadway in 1982. The character was played by Antoine Murray-Straughan and Marcquelle Ward in the 2014 and 2015 West End revivals respectively, and by Tyler Hanes in the 2016 Broadway revival.

On-screen, he was played by John Partridge in the 1998 film adaptation, and by Jason Derulo in the 2019 film adaptation.
