= Gus: The Theatre Cat =

Character from the poem and musical Cats

"Gus: The Theatre Cat" is a poem by T. S. Eliot included in Old Possum's Book of Practical Cats. Known as the "Theatre Cat" due to his career as an actor, Gus is an old and frail, yet revered, cat, who "suffers from palsy, which makes his paws shake." His coat is described as "shabby" and he is "no longer a terror to mice or to rats."

Gus, whose full name is Asparagus, is also a character in Andrew Lloyd Webber's musical adaption of the book, Cats. In the musical, the poem is used almost verbatim in the song "Gus: The Theatre Cat".

== The musical ==
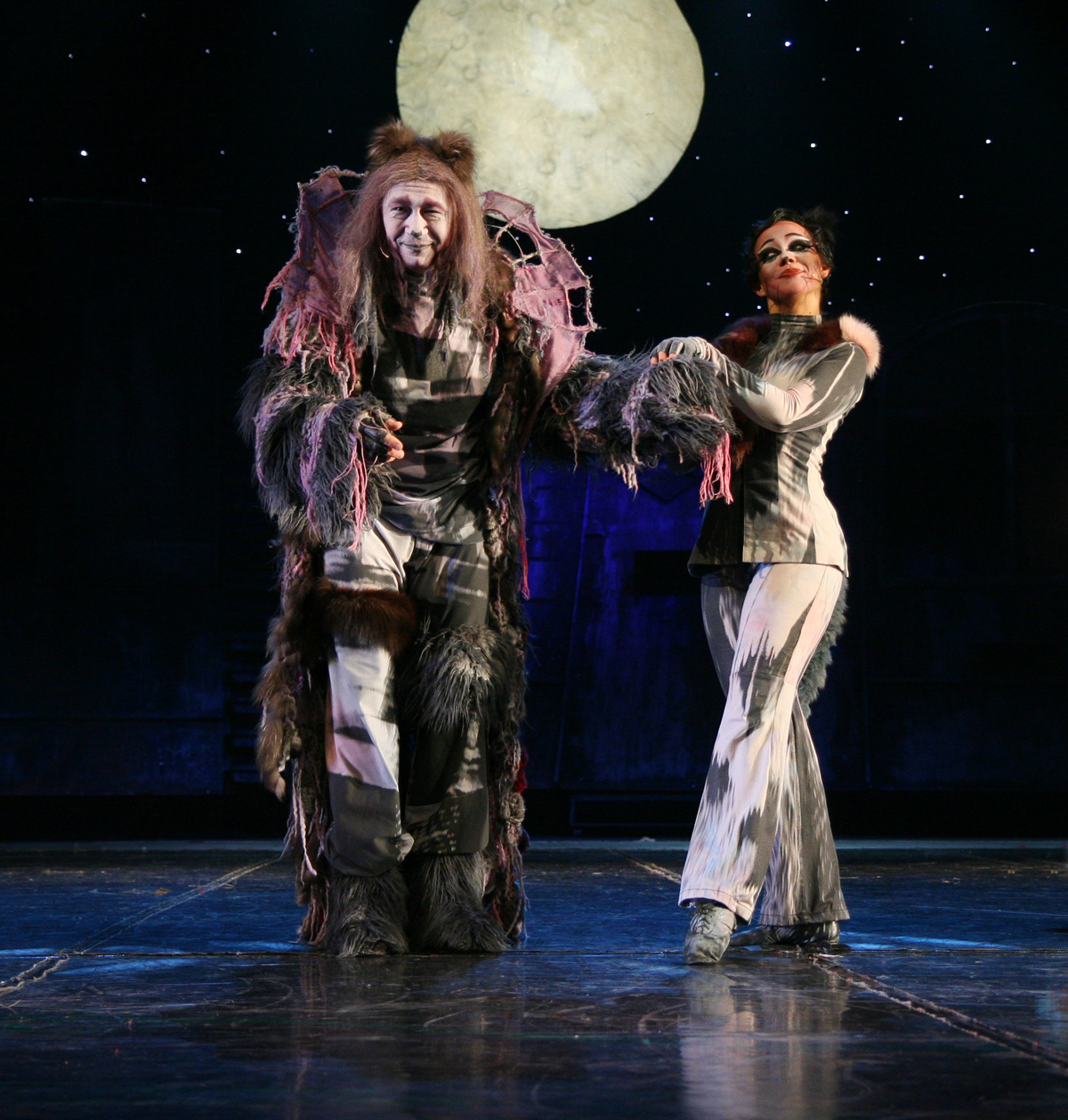
Wojciech Paszkowski as Gus and Marta Smuk as Galaretka (Jellylorum) in the musical "Cats" in Roma Musical Theatre in Warsaw, 13 October 2007.

Gus appears shortly after the start of Act II of Cats, where he and Jellylorum sing a duet about the highlights of his career, contrasting his present state with his acting heyday: "He has acted with Irving, he's acted with Tree." He and Jellylorum stress in particular his creation of the role of Firefrorefiddle, the Fiend of the Fell.

In its only major deviation from the poem, the song modifies the line "He once played a Tiger—could do it again—Which an Indian Colonel pursued down a drain." to "I once played Growltiger—could do it again" and uses this to segue into the song "Growltiger's Last Stand", wherein Gus recreates his role of Growltiger, a pirate cat. At the end of "Growltiger's Last Stand", Gus returns in a short reprise.

In the live stage show, the actor playing Gus is usually double-cast as Bustopher Jones. The role is meant to be played by an operatic tenor.

=== Notable casting ===
The role of Gus was originated by Stephen Tate in the West End in 1981, and by Stephen Hanan on Broadway in 1982. On screen, Gus was portrayed by John Mills in the 1998 film version of the musical, and by Ian McKellen in the 2019 film adaptation.

== Cultural references ==
The description in the original poem about Gus playing a "Tiger... which an Indian Colonel pursued down a drain" is a reference to the short story "The Adventure of the Empty House" by Sir Arthur Conan Doyle. In the story Colonel Sebastian Moran, chief underling of the infamous Professor Moriarty, is said to have pursued a man-eating tiger down a drain during his military service in India, before his criminal career.

Both the original poem and the number in the play refer to Gus's ability of pantomime, specifically in his serving as an understudy in a production of Dick Whittington and His Cat.

In the film Logan's Run, Logan and Jessica meet an old man in the Senate Chamber during their search for Sanctuary. The old man has many cats and references "The Naming of Cats", explaining that each cat has three names: one common, one unique, and one that only the cat knows. He refers to one cat in particular: Gus, short for Asparagus.
