= Munkustrap =

Fictional character in the musical Cats

- Cats character
- Michael Gruber as Munkustrap in the 1998 Cats film.
- First appearance: Cats (1981)
- Created by: Andrew Lloyd Webber
- Based on: Old Possum's Book of Practical Cats by T. S. Eliot

Munkustrap is a Jellicle cat from T. S. Eliot's 1939 poem "The Naming of Cats". He is a principal character and the main narrator in Andrew Lloyd Webber's 1981 musical Cats, which is based on Eliot's poems.

Munkustrap is the storyteller and guardian of his tribe. The role was originated by Jeff Shankley in the West End in 1981, and by Harry Groener on Broadway in 1982. Then, in the 1998 video production, Munkustrap was performed by Michael Gruber. Robbie Fairchild portrayed the role in the 2019 film adaptation.

== Character description ==
Munkustrap is the protector of the Jellicle tribe; he is brave, level-headed and dependable. As the tribe's second-in-command after Old Deuteronomy, he oversees the Jellicle Ball and ensures that everything runs smoothly. He functions as the show's main narrator, singing several songs and introducing many of the other cats. When Macavity attacks the tribe, it is Munkustrap who fights him off. Munkustrap's relationship with the other characters is depicted in the musical: he reveres Old Deuteronomy, watches out for the reckless younger members of his tribe.

He is usually depicted onstage as a tall, grey tabby cat with a commanding presence. The role is meant to be played by a baritone.

== Notable casting ==
The role of Munkustrap was originated by Jeff Shankley on the West End in 1981, and by Harry Groener on Broadway in 1982. Other notable performers include Gary Martin, Bryan Batt, John Partridge, Rob Marshall, David Burt, and Jeffry Denman. In the German-speaking world premiere of Cats, Steve Barton played the role of Munkustrap/Dance Captain in the Theater an der Wien. In the 2011 German tour, Matthew Goodgame played the role of Munkustrap. The character was played by Callum Train in the 2014 West End revival, and by Andy Huntington Jones in the 2016 Broadway revival.

On screen, Michael Gruber portrayed Munkustrap in the 1998 Cats film adaptation. Robbie Fairchild portrayed the role in the 2019 film adaptation.
