= Bryn Walters =

- Occupations: actor, dancer, choreographer

Bryn Walters is an actor, dancer and choreographer.

== Career ==
He played Macavity in the musical Cats, both in London's West End and in the 1998 film in which he also played the uncredited character Plato.

As choreographer and director he specializes in stadium events. He was live action director for the Euro 2012 opening and closing ceremonies, the Sochi 2014 Olympic Closing and Sochi Paralympics Opening Ceremonies, the Rio 2016 Closing Ceremony, and the 2017 Asian Indoor and Martial Arts Games (AIMAG). In 2019, Bryn Walters choreographed the Fete des Vignerons in Vevey, Switzerland. Bryn was engaged as live action director for the 2020 Summer Olympic Games opening ceremony in Tokyo, but the games were postponed due to the COVID19 pandemic and the eventual opening ceremony did not use mass movement as originally planned.
