= Ken Page =

American actor and singer (1954–2024)

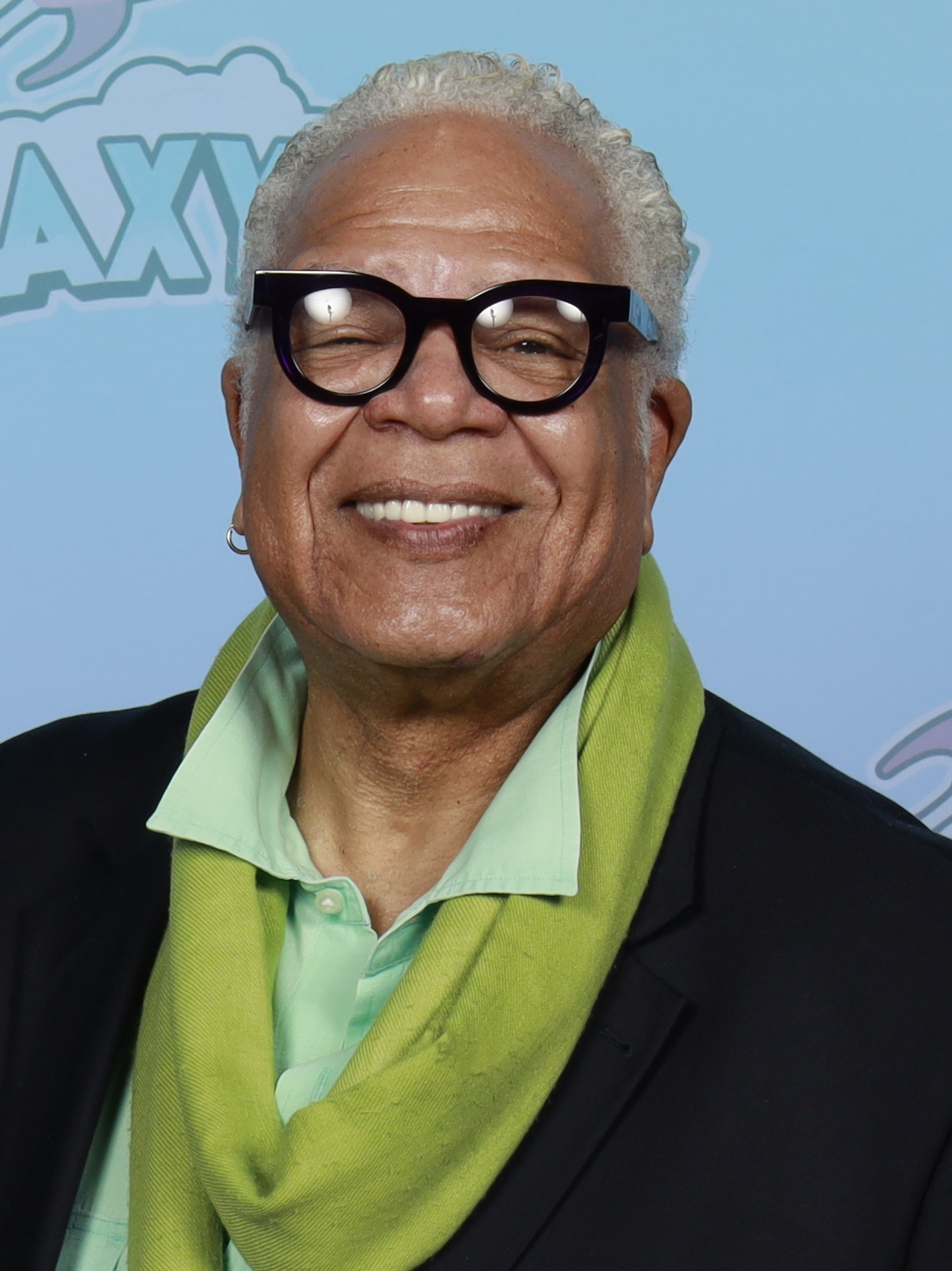
- Ken Page in 2024
- Born: Kenneth Page; January 20, 1954; St. Louis, Missouri, U.S.
- Died: September 30, 2024 (aged 70); St. Louis, Missouri, U.S.
- Education: Fontbonne College
- Occupations: Actor; singer
- Years active: 1973–2024
- Musical career
- Genres: Pop; traditional pop; musical theatre; Blues; R&B; Soul
- Instruments: Vocals
- Label: LML Music

Kenneth Page (January 20, 1954 – September 30, 2024) was an American actor and opera singer who created the part of Ken in the original Broadway production of Ain't Misbehavin' and played Old Deuteronomy in the original Broadway and filmed stage adaptation of Cats. He voiced Oogie Boogie in The Nightmare Before Christmas and Kingdom Hearts franchises, and played in the original Broadway production of The Wiz as The Lion and the first Broadway revival of Guys and Dolls as Nicely-Nicely Johnson.

== Early life ==
Kenneth Page was born and raised in St. Louis, Missouri on January 20, 1954. He was raised Catholic by his mother, Gloria, and his step-father, Garvin Gilstrap. He attended St. Bridget of Erin and St. Nicholas elementary schools. While attending St. Nicholas, he was inspired by a teacher and an older cousin to pursue theatre. He subsequently graduated from Bishop DuBourg High School in 1972. From there he attended Fontbonne College in Clayton, Missouri, on a full scholarship and majored in theatre.

== Career ==
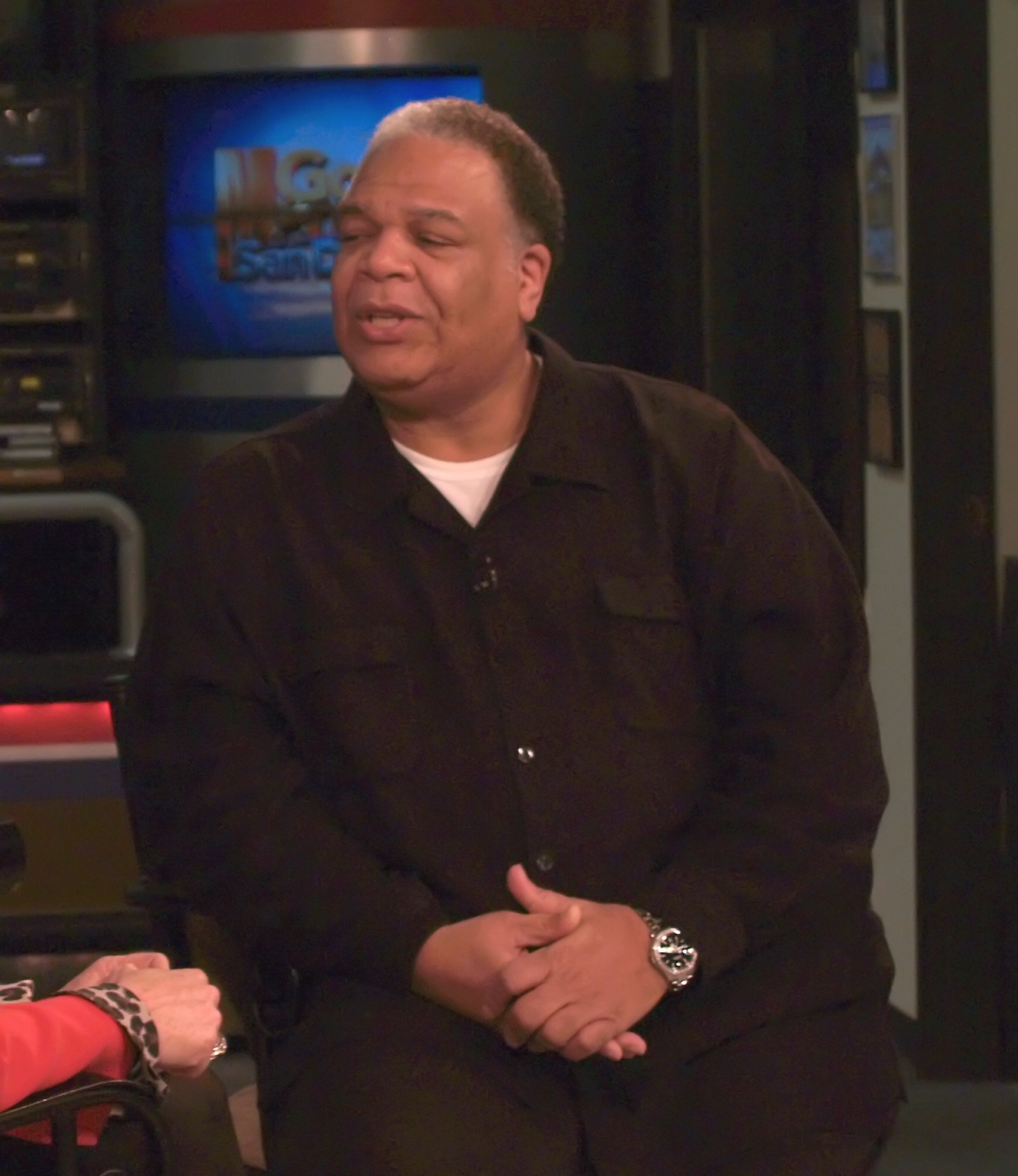
Page in 2008

Page began his career in the chorus of the Muny outdoor theater in St. Louis. After making his Broadway debut in The Wiz, he played Nicely-Nicely Johnson in the all-black revival of Guys and Dolls (Theatre World Award). He was then featured in the original cast of the Fats Waller musical revue, Ain't Misbehavin' (Drama Desk Award), a role he reprised in the 1982 television broadcast. He also returned to the show in its 1988 Broadway revival.

In 1982, Page played Old Deuteronomy in Cats, returning to the part in the 1998 video release. He also played God twice, in Randy Newman's Faust at La Jolla Playhouse and Goodman Theatre and in Stephen Schwartz's Children of Eden (West End). He frequently acted in shows at The Muny, with appearances including Jesus Christ Superstar, Aida, The Wizard of Oz, Les Misérables, My One and Only, and Little Shop of Horrors.

Besides The Nightmare Before Christmas, Page's major film credits included All Dogs Go to Heaven and Torch Song Trilogy, as well as Dreamgirls. His TV credits included guest roles on shows such as Charmed and Touched by an Angel, as well as various films and specials.

In later years, Page developed and performed his cabaret-singer show, Page by Page, and directed various regional and touring productions. He was the voice of the notorious talking plant Audrey II in the Muny's production of Little Shop of Horrors. He also reprised the role of Old Deuteronomy in the Lubbock Moonlight Musicals production of Cats in Lubbock, Texas.

Page regularly reprised his role as Oogie Boogie in several other Disney productions such as the fireworks display HalloWishes at Walt Disney World's Magic Kingdom, its sister show, Halloween Screams at Disneyland, the Haunted Mansion Holiday (also at Disneyland), the Hocus Pocus Villain Spelltacular (at Magic Kingdom) and subsequent video games including The Nightmare Before Christmas: The Pumpkin King, The Nightmare Before Christmas: Oogie's Revenge and the Kingdom Hearts series.

== Personal life ==
In September 2012, Page explained to the St. Louis Magazine: "I'm not closeted, never have been to my knowledge. But 'gay' means so many different things to people." He advised others: "Be careful. I understand, believe me – because I fought for your label. But don't define yourself by the label you put on yourself."

== Death ==
Ken Page died in his sleep on September 30, 2024, at the age of 70, at his home in St. Louis. (Note: Attributed to multiple sources:)

== Filmography ==
=== Film ===
Year	Title	Role	Notes
1988	Torch Song Trilogy	Murray	
1989	All Dogs Go to Heaven	King Gator	Voice
1993	The Nightmare Before Christmas	Oogie Boogie	Voice
1994	I'll Do Anything	Hair Person	
1998	Cats	Old Deuteronomy	Direct-to-video
2003	Shortcut to Happiness	Clerk	
2006	Dreamgirls	Max Washington	

=== Television ===
Year	Title	Role	Notes
1984	Gimme a Break!	Kenneth Wilson	Episode: "Class of '84"
1987–1988	Sable	Joe "Cheesecake" Tyson	6 episodes
1989	Polly	Mayor Warren	Television film
1989	Teen Angel Returns	Chubby	
1990	Family Matters	Darnell Watkins	Episode: "The Big Reunion"
1990	Capital News		Episode: "Finished? Not Dunne"
1990	Polly: Comin' Home!	Mayor Warren	Television film
1993–1994	Adventures in Wonderland	The Walrus	7 episodes
1994	Duckman	Additional Voices	Episode: "American Dicks"
1994	South Central	Dr. Raymond McHenry	3 episodes
1995	Touched by an Angel	Ox	Episode: "There But for the Grace of God"
1998–2005	Great Performances	Old Deuteronomy	2 episodes
2000	Welcome to New York	Chef Andre	Episode: "Tickets"
2005	All Grown Up!	Narrator, Man	Voice, episode: "Blind Man's Bluff"
2007	State of Mind	Florian	

=== Video games ===
Year	Title	Role	Notes
2002	Kingdom Hearts	Oogie Boogie	
2004	The Nightmare Before Christmas: Oogie's Revenge	Oogie Boogie	
2005	The Nightmare Before Christmas: The Pumpkin King	Oogie Boogie	
2006	Kingdom Hearts II	Oogie Boogie	
2007	Kingdom Hearts II: Final Mix+	Oogie Boogie	
2013	Kingdom Hearts HD 1.5 Remix	Oogie Boogie	Archive footage
2014	Kingdom Hearts HD 2.5 Remix	Oogie Boogie	Archive footage
2024	Disney Speedstorm	Oogie Boogie	Posthumous update release

== Theatre ==
=== Broadway ===
- 1975: The Wiz as The Lion
- 1976: Guys and Dolls as Nicely-Nicely Johnson
- 1978: Ain't Misbehavin' as Ken
- 1982: Cats as Old Deuteronomy
- 1988: Ain't Misbehavin' as Ken
- 1999: It Ain't Nothin' But the Blues as Performer

=== Off Broadway ===
- 1981: Louis as Joe "King" Oliver
- 1995: Call Me Madam as Senator Gallagher
- 1995: Out of this World as Jupiter
- 1998: The Wizard of Oz as The Cowardly Lion
- 2002: The Pajama Game as Mr. Hassler

=== Regional ===
- 1981: Damn Yankees as Van Buren (with Dick Van Dyke and Don Most)
- 1995: Randy Newman's Faust as the Lord
- 1996: Randy Newman's Faust as the Lord
- 2003: Dr. Seuss' How the Grinch Stole Christmas! The Musical as Old Max
- 2004: Breakfast at Tiffany's as Joe Bell
- 2006: Aida as Amonasro
- 2011: Grumpy Old Men: The Musical as Chuck
- 2014: Cats as Old Deuteronomy
- 2018: Little Shop of Horrors (musical) as Audrey II (voice)
- 2019: Grumpy Old Men: The Musical as Chuck

=== The Muny-St. Louis ===
- 1973: South Pacific as Stewpot
- 1973: Fiddler on the Roof as Chaim / Fruma Sarah (legs)
- 1974: Bitter Sweet as Ensemble
- 1994: Ain't Misbehavin' as Ken
- 1995: Camelot as King Pellinore
- 1996: Sleeping Beauty as the voice of Wendell
- 1997: The Wizard of Oz as Zeke/The Cowardly Lion
- 1998: Radio City Rockettes MUNY Spectacular as Ensemble
- 1998: Damn Yankees as Mgr. Van Buren
- 1999: Grease as Teen Angel
- 2001: My Fair Lady as Colonel Pickering
- 2002: The Fantasticks as Bellomy
- 2004: Cats as Old Deuteronomy
- 2004: Breakfast at Tiffany's as Joe
- 2005: Jesus Christ Superstar as King Herod
- 2005: Beauty and the Beast as Maurice/Narrator
- 2006: The Wizard of Oz as Professor Marvel/The Wizard of Oz
- 2006: Oliver! as Mr. Bumble
- 2006: Aida as Amonasro
- 2007: Les Misérables as Monsieur Thénardier
- 2008: My One and Only as Rt. Rev. J.D. Montgomery
- 2008: 90 Years of Muny Magic as Principal
- 2010: Cats as Old Deuteronomy
- 2010: Beauty and the Beast as Maurice/Narrator
- 2011: The Little Mermaid as King Triton
- 2011: Little Shop of Horrors as the voice of Audrey II
- 2012: Dreamgirls as Marty
- 2012: Aladdin as Sultan
- 2013: West Side Story as Doc
- 2014: Tarzan as Porter
- 2015: Into the Woods as The Narrator
- 2016: Aida as Amonasro
- 2018: Meet Me in St. Louis as Grandpa Prophater
- 2019: Guys and Dolls as Arvide Abernathy
- 2023: West Side Story as Doc
- 2024: Les Misérables as The Bishop of Digne

=== Hollywood Bowl ===
- 2009: Guys and Dolls in Concert as Nicely-Nicely Johnson
- 2018: The Nightmare Before Christmas in Concert as Oogie Boogie
- 2019: The Little Mermaid: An Immersive Live-to-Film Concert Experience as Sebastian

=== Other ===
- 1979: Ain't Misbehavin' as Performer 4 (US Tour)
- 1991: Children of Eden as Father/God (West End)
- 1995: Anyone Can Whistle as Police Chief Magruder (Carnegie Hall)
- 1997: A Christmas Carol as Ghost of Christmas Present/Sandwichboard Man (Madison Square Garden)
- 2021: The Nightmare Before Christmas in Concert as Oogie Boogie (BMO Stadium)
- 2022: The Nightmare Before Christmas in Concert as Oogie Boogie (Wembley Arena)

== Discography ==
=== Singles ===
- "Page by Page" (2008)

=== Soundtrack ===
Year	Artist / Writer	Song	Role	Film
1989	Charles Strouse & T.J. Kuenster	"Let's Make Music Together"	King Gator	All Dogs Go to Heaven
1993	Danny Elfman	"Oogie Boogie's Song"	Oogie Boogie	The Nightmare Before Christmas
1997	Charles Strouse & T.J. Kuenster	"Let's Make Music Together"	King Gator	MGM Sing-Alongs: Being Happy
1998	Andrew Lloyd Webber & T.S. Eliot	"Jellicle Songs for Jellicle Cats" "Old Deuteronomy" "The Awful Battle of the Pekes and the Pollicles" "The Jellicle Ball" "The Moments of Happiness" "Skimbleshanks: The Railway Cat" "The Ad-dressing of Cats"	Old Deuteronomy	Cats
2004	Danny Elfman	"Oogie's Song" "Casino Clash" "A Filthy Finale"	Oogie Boogie	The Nightmare Before Christmas: Oogie's Revenge

== Awards and nominations ==
Year	Award	Category	Play	Result
1976	Theatre World Award	Best Actor	Ain't Misbehavin	Won
1978	Drama Desk Award	Outstanding Actor in a Musical	Guys and Dolls	Won
