= Digital fur =

Computer generated imagery technique

Digital fur is the rendering of fur using computer generated imagery techniques. The rendering of fur is technically complex, because of the geometric complexity of modelling the hair strands or grass, the complex interplay of light within the fur volume and the effects of subsurface scattering within the skin.

Digital fur plays a substantial part in the creation of pseudo-photorealistic films such as Cats and The Lion King.
