= Jeff Shankley =

British actor and singer

Jeffrey Richard Shankley (born 17 November 1947) is a British actor, singer and a former member of the Royal Shakespeare Company who has had a long career as a television and stage actor particularly in the musicals of Andrew Lloyd Webber for whom he originated several roles, including Munkustrap in the original London production of Cats at the New London Theatre in London in 1981 and Greaseball in Starlight Express at the Apollo Victoria Theatre in 1984.

== Early life ==
Jeff Shankley was born in London in 1947, the son of Louisa Mary née Bundy (1922–1991) and Frederick John Shankley (1920–2006). He trained from 1966 to 1968 at the Royal Academy of Dramatic Art (RADA), where he won a silver medal for acting, and prizes for diction and expressiveness in movement.

== Television ==
His first television role was as Sydney in an episode of No Hiding Place in 1963. His other appearances include Alec Law/Tom/Walker/George Ward in Dixon of Dock Green (1963–1966); Lionel in ITV Play of the Week (1964); Peter in Our Man at St. Mark's (1964); Peter in The Barnstormers (1964); Ken in You and the World (1965); 1st Soldier/Devil/Third Shepherd in Mysteries and Miracles (1965); Cox in Redcap (1965); Apprentice in Let's Go Out (1966); Private Boakes in A Family at War (1971); Jimmy Dunn in The Expert (1971); Mark in ITV Sunday Night Theatre (1971); Clive Savage in Beryl's Lot (1974); Captain Bidet in T-Bag (1992); Barry from the Shop in Sean's Show (1992–1993); Gerry Summers in Love Hurts (1994); Jeff Brodie in Peak Practice (1995); Chief Superintendent Spencer/Dan Paley in The Bill (1994–1998), Des in Playing the Field (2000); Boss in My Family (2000), and Uriah Rhodes/Harry Irwin in Holby City (2009).

== Theatre roles ==
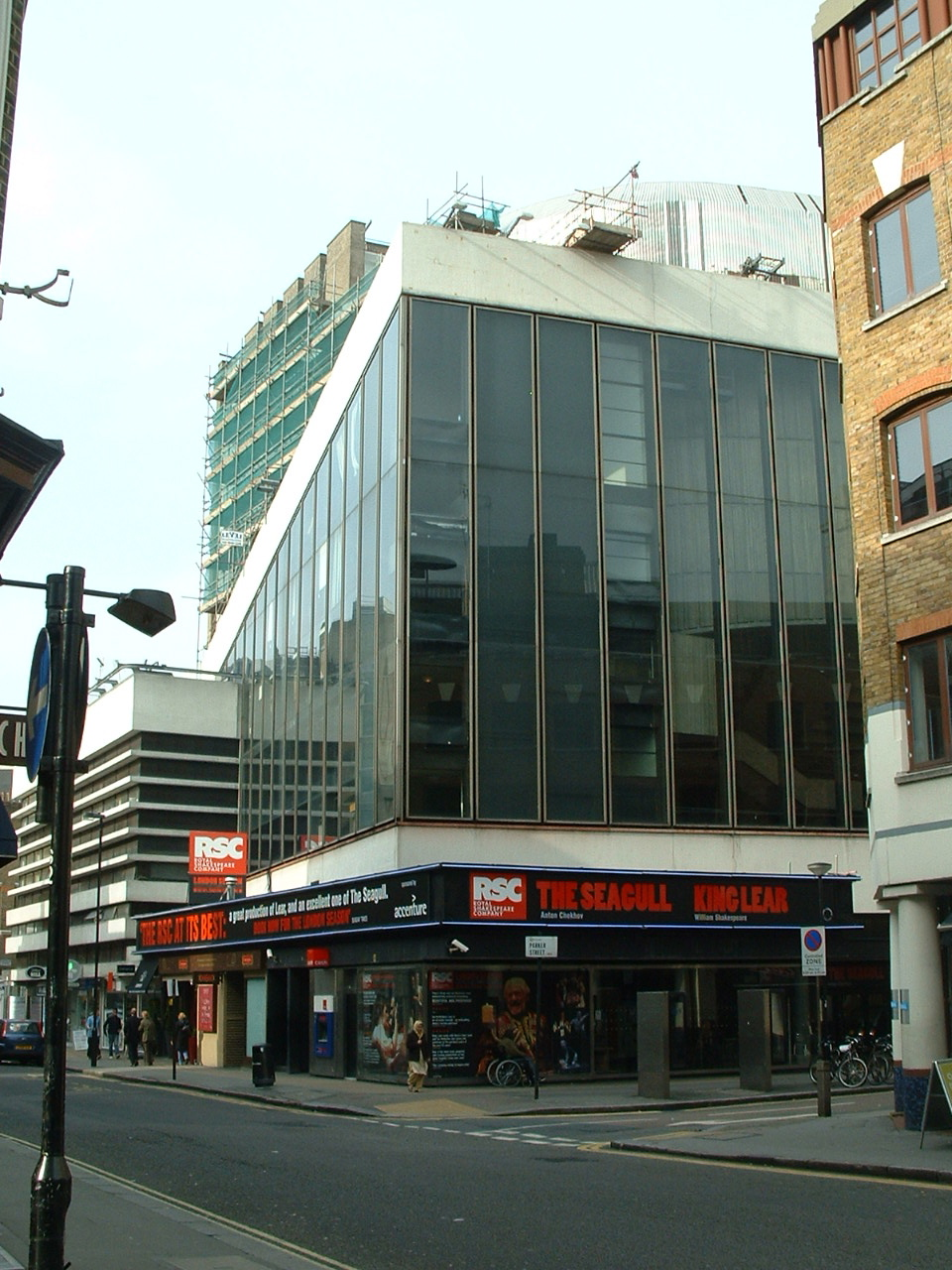
Shankley originated the role of Munkustrap in Cats at the New London Theatre in London (1981)

A baritone, his theatre credits include Pilate in Jesus Christ Superstar at the Palace Theatre in London (1972); Eric Birling in An Inspector Calls at the Alexandra Theatre, Birmingham and the Grand Theatre, Swansea (1974); Frank-N-Furter in a German production of The Rocky Horror Show in 1980, and Necheave in The Revolutionary at the Royal Court Theatre. Puck in A Midsummer Night's Dream, Don John in Much Ado About Nothing and Laertes in Hamlet at The New Shakespeare Company. For the Birmingham Repertory Company in 1969 he appeared in Waiting for Godot, Toad of Toad Hall and Quick, Quick, Slow and was Prince Hal in Henry IV, Part 1 and Fred in Saved. In 1980 he returned to the company to play Victor Prynne in Private Lives. He played Monsieur André in the first workshop of The Phantom of the Opera.

His West End credits include Frank Schultz in Show Boat, Jed in West of Suez, Pontius Pilate in Jesus Christ Superstar, Al in A Chorus Line and Endicott in Windy City. He originated the roles of Munkustrap in Cats at the New London Theatre in London (1981), Greaseball in Starlight Express at the Apollo Victoria Theatre (1984), Lord Melchisedic The Time Lord in Time at the Dominion Theatre (1986), and Lorry Driver/Bruce Tick/Motorcyclist in Alan Ayckbourn's The Revengers' Comedies at the Stephen Joseph Theatre in Scarborough (1989) and at the Strand Theatre in London in 1991.

He was Gary Strong in Radio Times at the Queen's Theatre in London with Tony Slattery (1992), and was the Ghost of Christmas Present for the Royal Shakespeare Company at the Barbican Theatre in London in 1995. Shankley played George in Spend Spend Spend at the Piccadilly Theatre (1999); Gus/Growltiger in Cats in Germany in 2002; Sir Henry Baskerville in The Hound of the Baskervilles at the Nottingham Playhouse (2004), while in 2005–2006 and 2016 he played Pop in We Will Rock You at the Dominion Theatre. 2008 saw him playing John Wilkes/Dr Meade in the musical Gone With the Wind at the New London Theatre.
