= Cats: Complete Original Broadway Cast Recording =

Cats

Cast recording by the original Broadway cast
- Released: January 26, 1983
- Recorded: October 1982
- Genre: Show tunes
- Length: 1:41:07
- Label: Geffen Records
- Producer: Andrew Lloyd Webber

A cast recording by the original Broadway cast of the musical Cats was released on January 26, 1983, by Geffen Records. It was later reissued by Polydor in 1993, and remastered in 2005.

The recording won Best Cast Show Album at the 26th Annual Grammy Awards.

== Development and release ==
The original Broadway cast of Cats, including the understudies, recorded the album in October 1982. Andrew Lloyd Webber flew in from London to oversee the recording, which was estimated to cost as much as $400,000.

The recording was released on January 26, 1983, in two versions: a two-record/disc/cassette complete set, and a one-record/disc/cassette highlights version.

== Track listing ==
All tracks written by T. S. Eliot and Andrew Lloyd Webber, with any additional writers noted.

In the later Polydor reissue of the recording, the third track on disc two is incorrectly listed as containing "The Ballad of Billy McCaw", a duet based on an unpublished poem by Eliot that was used in the original London production. It actually contains an Italian mock aria titled "In Una Tepida Notte", which replaced "The Ballad of Billy McCaw" in the original Broadway run and was incorporated into all other US and UK productions of Cats.

"The Awefull Battle of the Pekes and the Pollicles", a song describing a fight between two tribes of dogs, is not included in this recording. It originally appeared between "Old Deuteronomy" and "The Jellicle Ball" in Act One, then was moved to Act Two to replace "Growltiger's Last Stand" after the latter song was cut from the US and UK productions in 2016.

Disc 1
No.	Title	Writer(s)	Length
1.	"The Overture"		2:52
2.	"Prologue: Jellicle Songs for Jellicle Cats"	Trevor Nunn; Richard Stilgoe	5:17
3.	"The Naming of Cats"		3:02
4.	"The Invitation to the Jellicle Ball"		2:10
5.	"The Old Gumbie Cat"		3:49
6.	"The Rum Tum Tugger"		3:42
7.	"Grizabella, The Glamour Cat"		3:06
8.	"Bustopher Jones"		3:08
9.	"Mungojerrie and Rumpelteazer"		4:28
10.	"Old Deuteronomy"		4:03
11.	"The Jellicle Ball"		9:34
12.	"Grizabella, The Glamour Cat/Memory"	Nunn	4:22

Disc 2
No.	Title	Writer(s)	Length
1.	"The Moments of Happiness"		3:14
2.	"Gus: The Theatre Cat"		6:32
3.	"Growltiger's Last Stand/The Ballad of Billy McCaw"		11:41
4.	"Skimbleshanks: The Railway Cat"		4:52
5.	"Macavity: The Mystery Cat"		8:23
6.	"Mr. Mistoffelees"		4:25
7.	"Memory"	Nunn	5:21
8.	"The Journey to the Heaviside Layer"		2:44
9.	"The Ad-Dressing of Cats"		4:22

== Reception ==
Professional ratings
Review scores
Source	Rating
AllMusic	5/5 stars

=== Critical reception ===
Matthew Murray gave the recording four out of five stars, praising the orchestration and the cast's performance, particularly Betty Buckley's rendition of "Memory". However, he was wary of "the unconvincing Brit[ish] accents and American vocal mannerisms." The recording also received favorable reviews from the Star Tribune and the Times Colonist.

=== Commercial performance ===
The album was certified Platinum by the Recording Industry Association of America on December 5, 1988. According to Playbill, it has sold over 2 million copies and is the 16th-best-selling cast recording in the United States of all time.

=== Accolades ===
The recording won Best Cast Show Album at the 26th Annual Grammy Awards.

== Weekly charts ==
Chart	Peak position
Austrian Albums (Ö3 Austria)	5
New Zealand Albums (RMNZ)	17
US Billboard 200	131
