= Michael Gruber (actor) =

American actor (born 1964)

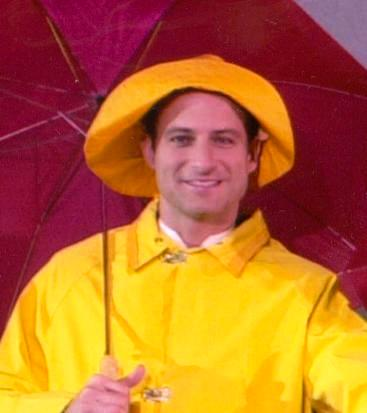
- Michael in Singin' In The Rain, Music Theatre Of Wichita, 2000
- Born: November 1, 1964 (age 61); Cincinnati, Ohio, U.S.
- Occupation: Actor
- Years active: 1987–present
- Spouse: Tony Vierling (m. 2013)

Michael Thomas Gruber (born November 1, 1964) is an American actor.

He was born in Cincinnati, Ohio, the youngest of four children, two sisters and one brother. At an early age, Michael showed great interest in gymnastics and diving. He became the 2nd best diver in his age class in the world at the age of fourteen.

Michael was an All-American diver who graduated from Indian Hill High School in 1982 and attended the University of Michigan on an athletic scholarship as an Olympic diving hopeful training under then Olympic coach Dick Kimball.

His passion was acting and he decided to study theatre at the University of Cincinnati College-Conservatory of Music. He made his Broadway debut in the final company of A Chorus Line, 1989-90.

Michael is a composer and co-lyricist, with long-time collaborator Jennifer Allen, of three musicals: The Old Dead Five, Vegas Organic and Hit It, Mike!. He has also composed music for poems, currently working on a series set to children's poetry.

Michael has performed the roles of Munkustrap both on Broadway and in the 1998 Cats proshot. He quotes regarding Cats, "It is sort of the signature of my career."

== Theatre credits ==
=== New York ===
Year	Title	Role	Theatre	Notes
2007	Stairway To Paradise	Joe	New York City Centre Encores!	Revue in Review An Original Encores! Production
2006	Applause for the Golden Boy: The Music of Charles Strouse	Performer	New York Historical Society, New York City	Benefit Tribute
2005	And Then I Wrote... The Songs of Steve Marzullo	Performer	Birdland Jazz Club, New York City	Concert
2003	Laughing Room Only	Standby	Lena Horne Theatre	Broadway
2003	A Manhattan Christmas	Performer	King Kong Room, New York City	Cabaret
2001	Kiss Me, Kate	Hortensio (Second Suitor) (replacement); Ensemble (replacement)	Al Hirschfeld Theatre	Broadway
2000	14th Annual Easter Bonnet Competition	Performer	New Amsterdam Theatre	BCEFA event
1999-20	Swing!	Performer	St. James Theatre	Broadway, part of the original cast
1998	Dreamgirls	Dave	Evening Dinner Theatre, Elmsford, NY	Dinner Theatre
1997	The Wizard of Oz	The Tin Man/Hickory	The Theatre at Madison Square Garden	Off Broadway
1996-99	CATS	Munkustrap	Winter Garden Theatre	Broadway, periodically left to do other shows
1996	Angela Lansbury - A Celebration	Me and My Town Dancer	Majestic Theatre	This benefit concert only had one performance on November 17, 1996
1995	Little By Little	Man	Eighty-eights Club, New York City	Off-Off Broadway
1993	7th Annual Easter Bonnet Competition	Broadway GI	Broadway Theatre	BCEFA event
1992-93	My Favorite Year (musical)	Ensemble	Vivian Beaumont Theater	Broadway, part of the original cast
1991-94	Miss Saigon	Ensemble	Broadway theatre	Broadway, part of the original cast. Periodically left to do other shows
1989-90	A Chorus Line	Mike	Sam S. Shubert Theatre	Broadway, part of the final cast. Michael's Broadway debut!

=== Tours ===
Year	Title	Role	Notes
2008-09	A Chorus Line	Zach	National and International Tours
1999	Tommy	Cousin Kevin	Concert Tour
1990	West Side Story	Riff	US National Tour
1988	West Side Story	Riff	European Tour

=== Regional shows ===
Year	Title	Role	Theatre	Notes
2024-25	White Christmas	Bob Wallace	Chanhassen Dinner Theatres, Chanhassen, MN	
2023-24	Jersey Boys	Gyp DeCarlo	Chanhassen Dinner Theatres, Chanhassen, MN	
2022-23	Footloose	Rev. Shaw Moore	Chanhassen Dinner Theatres, Chanhassen, MN	
2020-22	The Music Man	Harold Hill	Chanhassen Dinner Theatres, Chanhassen, MN	The show stopped running because of COVID from January to July 2021
2019-20	Mamma Mia!	Harry Bright	Chanhassen Dinner Theatres, Chanhassen, MN	
2018-19	Holiday Inn	Jim Hardy	Chanhassen Dinner Theatres, Chanhassen, MN	
2018	Newsies	Nunzio	Chanhassen Dinner Theatres, Chanhassen,	
2016	South Pacific	Cmdr. William Harbison	Guthrie Theater, Minneapolis, MN	Wurtele Thrust Stage
2015	The Music Man	Ensemble	Guthrie Theater, Minneapolis, MN	Wurtele Thrust Stage
2014	My Fair Lady	Swing	Guthrie Theater, Minneapolis, MN	Wurtele Thrust Stage
2013-14	Fiddler on the Roof	Avram	Chanhassen Dinner Theatres, Chanhassen, MN	
2012-13	Bye Bye Birdie	Albert Peterson	Chanhassen Dinner Theatres, Chanhassen, MN	
2012	Roman Holiday	Ensemble	Guthrie Theater, Minneapolis, MN	McGuire Proscenium Stage
2011-12	Hairspray	Corny Collins	Chanhassen Dinner Theatres, Chanhassen, MN	
2011	Jesus Christ Superstar	Judas/ James of Alphaeus	Chanhassen Dinner Theatres, Chanhassen, MN	
2010-11	Joseph and the Amazing Technicolor Dreamcoat	Simeon	Ordway Center for the Performing Arts	
2010	Hairspray	Corny Collins	Theatre Under the Stars, Houston, TX	The Hobby Center Sarofim Hall
2010	Hits from The Music Man	Harold Hill	Benaroya Hall, Seattle, WA	Seattle Symphony, conducted by Marvin Hamlisch
2009	White Christmas	Bob Wallace	5th Avenue Theatre, Seattle, WA	
2009	Singin' in the Rain	Don Lockwood	Ordway Center for the Performing Arts, St. Paul, MN	
2009	Grey Gardens	George Gould Strong	Ordway Center for the Performing Arts, St. Paul, MN	
2008	White Christmas	Bob Wallace	Theatre Under The Stars, Houston	
2007	Irving Berlin's Easter Parade	Don Hewes	Chanhassen Theatres, Chanhassen, MN	World Premiere
2007	White Christmas	Bob Wallace	5th Avenue Theatre, Seattle and California Musical Theatre, Sacramento	
2006	My One and Only	Billy Buck	Reprise Concert Series, Freud Playhouse, Westwood, CA	
2006	Godspell	Jesus	Walnut Street Theatre, Philadelphia	
2006	Guys and Dolls	Sky	Maltz Jupiter Theatre, FL	
2005	White Christmas	Phil Davis	Wang Center Theatre, Boston Revival	
2005	What a Glorious Feeling	Stanley Donen	Mason Street Warehouse, MI	World Premiere
2005	Singin' in the Rain	Don Lockwood	Theatre Under The Stars - Houston, TX; 5th Avenue Theatre - Seattle, WA; California Musical Theatre - Sacramento, CA	A co-operative production with the theatres listed
2004	Anything Goes	Billy Crocker	Stratford Festival of Canada	
2003	Wizard of Oz	The Tin Man/Hickory	Stratford Festival of Canada	
2003	Crazy for You	Bobby Child	Marian Theatre and Solvang Festival, CA	
2003	Anything Goes	Billy Crocker	Riverside Theatre, FL	
2002	Dames at Sea	Lucky	Goodspeed Opera House-CT	
2002	Smokey Joe's Cafe		Sacramento, CA	
2002	Dames at Sea	Lucky	Goodspeed Opera House	
2001	Red Hot and Blue	Fingers	Paper Mill Playhouse, Milburn, NJ	
2000	Anything Goes	Billy Crocker	5th Avenue Theatre-Seattle	
2000	Rags	Saul	Walnut Street Theatre, Philadelphia	
2000	Singin' in the Rain	Don Lockwood	Music Theatre of Wichita (KS)	
1999	Floyd's Follies Flood Relief	Performer	Paper Mill Playhouse, Milburn, NJ	Benefit Concert
1998	Follies	Young Ben	Paper Mill Playhouse, Milburn, NJ	
1998	History of Sex	Narrator	Golden Nugget Casino, Las Vegas	
1995	West Side Story	Riff	Muny Theatre, St. Louis, MO	
1995	Curtain Raisers Salute New Year's	Performer	Paper Mill Playhouse, Milburn, NJ	Concert
1995	Oklahoma!	Jud Fry	Phoenix & Tucson, AZ	
1994	Kiss Me, Kate	Bill/Lucentio	Goodspeed Opera House-CT	
1994	West Side Story	Riff	Music Theatre of Wichita	
1994	Harvest of Stars Gala: An Autumn Evening with ArtsPower	Performer	Paper Mill Playhouse, Milburn, NJ	ArtsPower Benefit
1994	Singin' in the Rain	Don Lockwood	Paper Mill Playhouse, Milburn, NJ	
1993	Little Me	George Musgrove	Birmingham Theatre, Birmingham, MI	
1993	Falsettos	Whizzer	Alliance Theatre, Atlanta	
1993	Anything Goes	Billy Crocker	Music Theatre of Wichita	
1993	Good News!	Tom Marlowe	Music Theatre of Wichita	
1993	Singin' in the Rain	Don Lockwood	California Musical Theatre	
1993	Songs of Unlikely Lovers	Performer	Music Theatre of Wichita	A Valentine's Day Review
1992	Singin' in the Rain	Don Lockwood	Music Theatre of Wichita	
1988	Joseph and the Amazing Technicolor Dreamcoat	Joseph	Alaska Light Opera, Anchorage	
1987	My One and Only	Ensemble	Paper Mill Playhouse, Milburn, NJ	

=== Readings / Workshops ===
Year	Title	Notes
2003	Taboo	New York City
2003	Sammy Cahn	
2002	Ain't That a Kick in the Head	Workshop at The New 42nd Street Studios, New York City
1997	Dodsworth	Part of a New Works festival at National Alliance for Musical Theatre

== Filmography ==
=== Film ===
Year	Title	Role	Notes
1997	Oz: The American Fairyland	Tin Man (uncredited)	Documentary
1997	CATS	Munkustrap	Filmed 1997, released 1998

=== Television ===
Year	Title	Role	Notes
2000	The Rosie O'Donnell Show	Self	Dated February 1st 2000 and June 1st 2000
1997	The 51st Annual Tony Awards	Self	TV Special
1991	The 45th Annual Tony Awards	Self	TV Special
1996	As The World Turns	Ron	Dated March 8th 1996

== Discography ==
Year	Title	Record label
2013	A Midnight Queer	One Voice Mixed Chorus
2001	Carols for a Cure 2001 (BC/EFA)	Rock-It Science Records
2000	Swing!	Sony Classics
2000	The Most Happy Fella	Jay Records
1998	Wonderful Town	Jay Records
1998	Follies	TVT Soundtrax
1996	42nd Street	Jay Records
1996	Singin' in the Rain	Jay Records
1993	My Favorite Year	BMG Classics
1993	Good News!	Jay Records
