= Old Deuteronomy =

Character from Cats

- Cats character
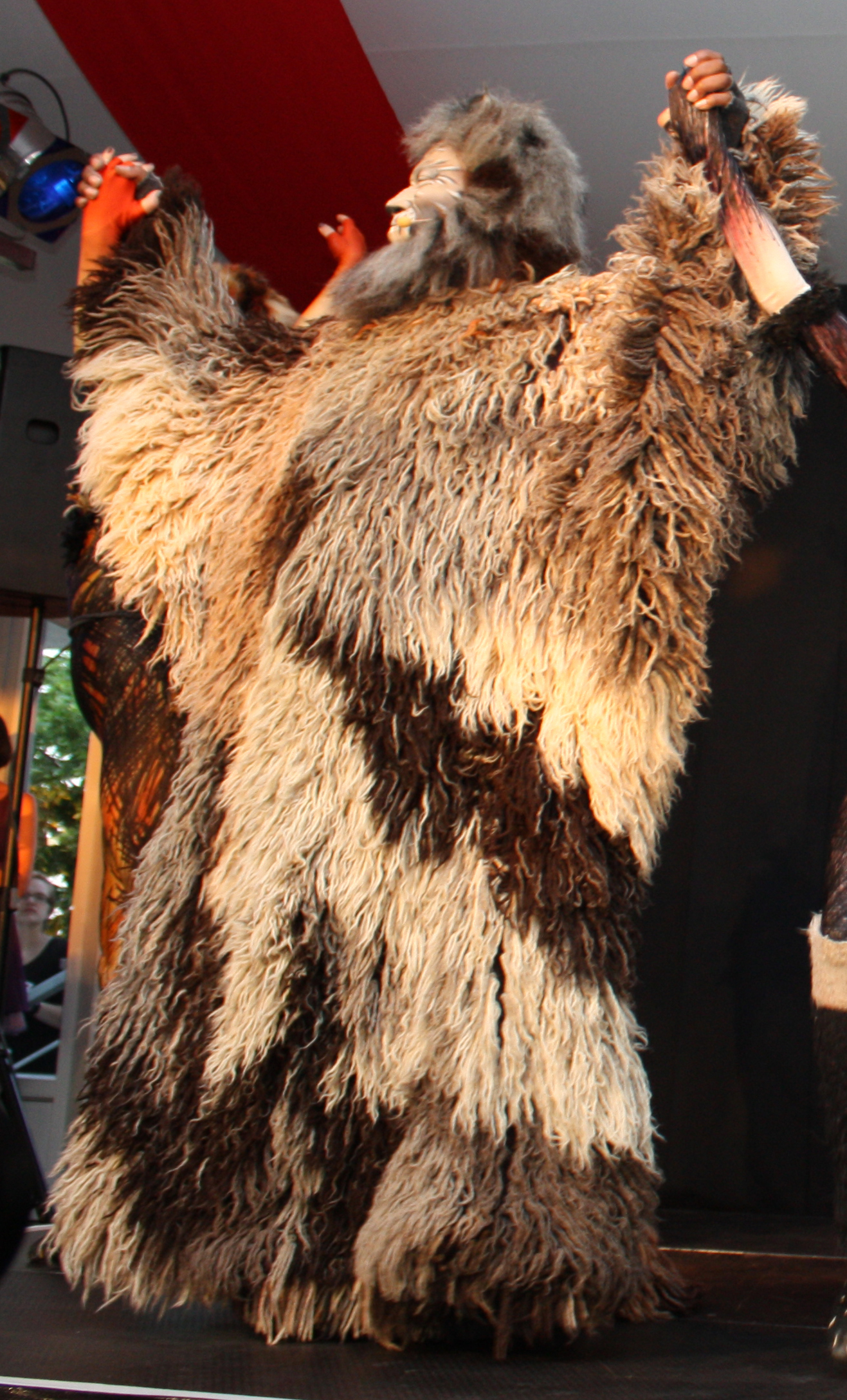
- Old Deuteronomy as he is typically depicted; from a promotional event in Germany in 2011.
- First appearance: Cats (1981)
- Created by: Andrew Lloyd Webber
- Based on: Old Possum's Book of Practical Cats by T. S. Eliot

Old Deuteronomy is a character in T. S. Eliot's 1939 Old Possum's Book of Practical Cats and its 1981 musical adaptation, Cats. He is a wise and beloved elderly cat, further serving as the Jellicle patriarch in the musical. The role of Old Deuteronomy was originated by Brian Blessed in the West End in 1981, and by Ken Page on Broadway in 1982. Judi Dench plays Old Deuteronomy in the 2019 film adaptation.

== Poem ==
In Eliot's original poem, Old Deuteronomy is described as an ancient, wise cat who has "lived many lives in succession" and is respected by the other cats and humans (and perhaps even dogs) around him. His name derives from the biblical Book of Deuteronomy, which shares the central element of law with the character (who is a magistrate).

== Musical ==
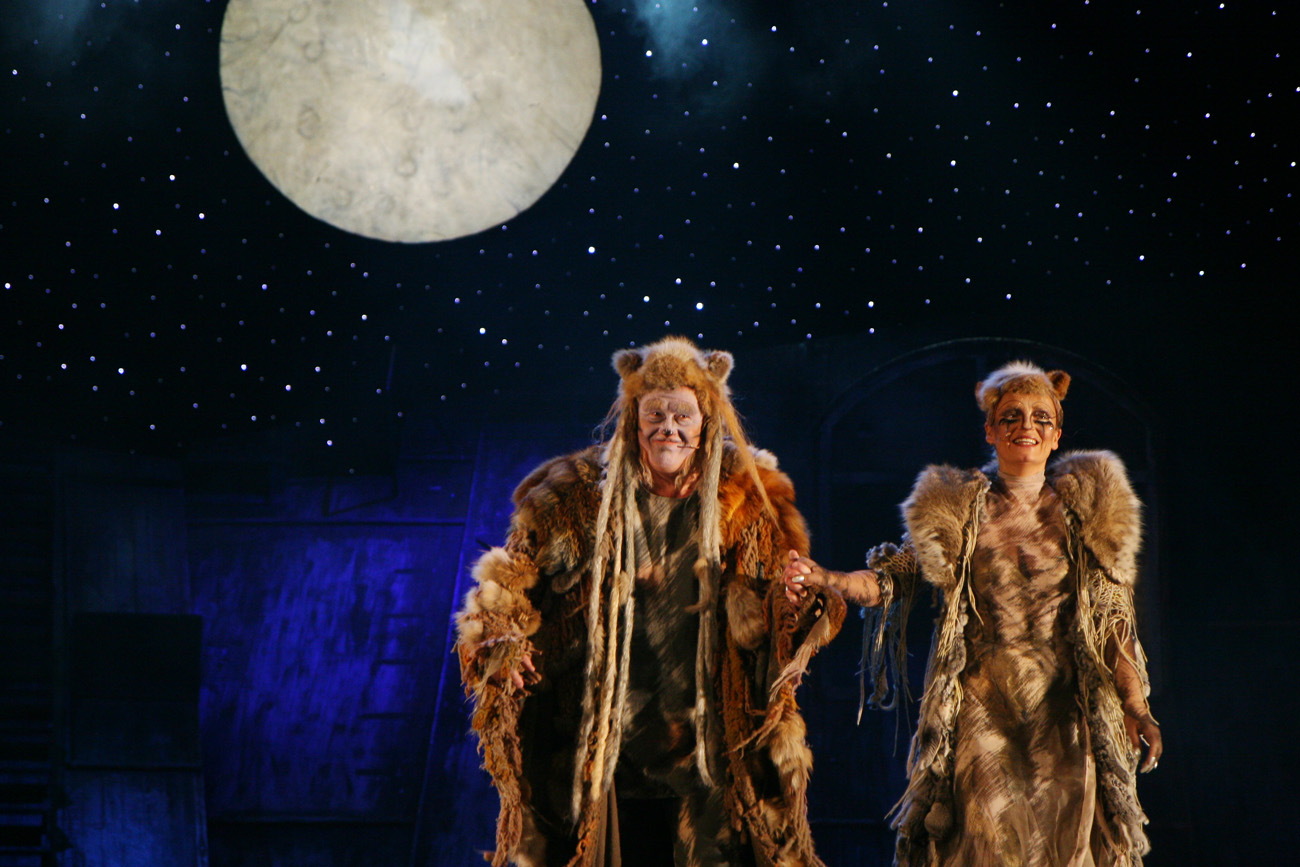
Zbigniew Macias as Old Deuteronomy (left) and Izabela Zając as Grizabella in the non-replica Polish production of Cats, 2007.

Cats expands on the theme of wisdom by depicting Old Deuteronomy as the leader of the show's Jellicle cats, providing comfort and guidance to the other characters. He also has the task of making the "Jellicle Choice" and choosing the cat who will ascend to the Heaviside Layer. Much of the plot of Cats is fueled by this premise; several characters perform and try to convince Old Deuteronomy to choose them. Towards the end of the show, Old Deuteronomy is kidnapped by Macavity and eventually rescued by Mr. Mistoffelees. He then persuades the other cats to listen to Grizabella, selects her to be reborn, and escorts her to the Heaviside Layer.

More has been revealed about Old Deuteronomy's past than most of the other Jellicle cats, although how much of it is true is debatable. He is alleged to have been alive long before Queen Victoria was crowned and has been mated numerous times (supposedly, anywhere between nine and ninety-nine). Though Old Deuteronomy has outlived his partners, he has had numerous progeny.

Old Deuteronomy has three songs in Cats, including the final number, "The Ad-dressing of Cats." He is traditionally played by a high baritone or tenor who can hit G♯.

=== Appearance ===
Old Deuteronomy has a full beard and, unlike the unitard that the other characters don, his costume consists of a loose-fitting shaggy coat.

=== Notable casting ===
The role of Old Deuteronomy was originated by Brian Blessed in the West End in 1981, and by Ken Page on Broadway in 1982. Quentin Earl Darrington played the character in the 2016 Broadway revival. West End star Dave Willetts portrayed the role in the 20th anniversary cast of the West End production. André De Shields played the role in the off-Broadway revival Cats: "The Jellicle Ball" at Perelman Performing Arts Center in 2024, which he later reprised for the Broadway transfer.

On screen, Page reprised the role for the 1998 filmed version, being the only cast member from the original Broadway cast to appear in the film. Judi Dench portrayed a female Old Deuteronomy in the 2019 film adaptation.
