= Grizabella =

Main character in the musical Cats

- Elaine Paige as Grizabella
- Created by: T. S. Eliot
- Portrayed by: Elaine Paige (West End, video); Betty Buckley (Broadway); Jennifer Hudson (film)

In-universe information
- Species: Cat
- Gender: Female

Grizabella the Glamour Cat is a starring role in the Andrew Lloyd Webber musical Cats. The show's signature number, "Memory," belongs to her.

Elaine Paige originated the role in the show's West End premier in 1981 (replacing Dame Judi Dench just four days before the production's opening night), and by Betty Buckley on Broadway in 1982. Buckley won the 1983 Tony Award for Best Featured Actress in a Musical for her portrayal. Jennifer Hudson played Grizabella in the 2019 film version.

== Character ==
In Act I, the Jellicle Cats are in the process of deciding who among them will ascend to the Heaviside Layer (the Jellicles' conception of heaven). Grizabella enters the scene an outsider to the tribe, old and decrepit. She is no longer the glamorous cat of her youth. Having left the Jellicle cats behind long ago, she is now alone, left with only memories of happier days. She begs for re-acceptance, but Demeter and Bombalurina, repulsed, explain to the tribe who she once was ("Grizabella the Glamour Cat"), and urge them to shun her, which they do.

At the end of Act I, Grizabella is left to watch from afar as the other cats dance at the Jellicle Ball. When she attempts to dance, too, she finds that she is now too weak to do so, a fact that she laments in both a reprise of "Grizabella" and a prelude to "Memory."

In the show's climactic scene, Grizabella sings "Memory" in full to the gathering of the Jellicle cats, pleading for understanding and acceptance. She collapses, near death, in midst of it but presses on until the end, encouraged by the kitten Jemima. Victoria then offers her a gesture of acceptance, and then the other Jellicles follow suit. They escort Grizabella before their leader, Old Deuteronomy, who in turn escorts her as she ascends as their chosen one to the Heaviside Layer.

The role of Grizabella requires a wide vocal range and the ability to belt to E♭5.

== Origins and songs ==
T. S. Eliot omitted Grizabella when he published Old Possum's Book of Practical Cats, the musical's source; he thought that her story was "too sad for children."

The opening lyrics of the musical's number "Grizabella: The Glamour Cat" are from Eliot's "Rhapsody on a Windy Night" (with the substitution of "cat" for "woman"):

Remark the woman
Who hesitates toward you in the light of the door
Which opens on her like a grin.
You see the border of her dress
Is torn and stained with sand,
And you see the corner of her eye
Twists like a crooked pin.

— Excerpt from "Rhapsody on a Windy Night", T. S. Eliot

The song lyric concludes with an unpublished fragment—all that remained of the omitted poem—given to Lloyd Webber by Eliot's widow and literary executor, Valerie Eliot:

Grizabella had "haunted many a low resort," and made the postman sigh "as he scratched his head / You really would have thought she ought to be dead / And who would ever suppose that that / Was Grizabella the Glamour Cat?"

LLoyd Webber combined this composite figure with his own interpretation of a letter Eliot had written to his publisher referring to the Jellicle Cats as ballooning "Up, up, up to the Russell Hotel / Up, up, to the Heaviside Layer" (of the ionosphere, originally). This pair of concepts transformed Lloyd Webber's musical setting of Eliot's verses for children into a landmark of musical theatre, introducing to a central death-and-rebirth theme not present in any of the Eliot source material.

Grizabella's song "Memory," is the centerpiece of the show, and is considered to be one of the most successful Broadway musical songs. Trevor Nunn is said to have loosely based its lyrics on Eliot's "Rhapsody," too, completing them only during the show's opening previews in London.

The song has been recorded hundreds of times by artists including Barbra Streisand, Jennifer Hudson, Nicole Scherzinger, Leonora Lewis and Johnny Mathis.

== Notable performers ==
The role of Grizabella was originated by Elaine Paige in the West End in 1981. She later reprised the role for the 1998 film version. Betty Buckley originated the role in the 1982 Broadway production, earning the 1983 Tony Award for Best Featured Actress in a Musical for her performance. In 2015, pop singer Nicole Scherzinger was nominated for a Laurence Olivier Award for Best Supporting Actress for her performance in the West End revival. In the 2016 Broadway revival, Mamie Parris replaced Leona Lewis in the role in October.

Notable performers who have played the role of Grizabella include:

=== West End ===
- Elaine Paige (original cast)
- Angela Richards (1982)
- Marti Webb (1983)
- Anita Harris (1985–1986)
- Rosemarie Ford (1995)
- Diane Langton (1996)
- Stephanie Lawrence (1997)
- Sally Ann Triplett (1998)
- Chrissie Hammond (1999–2002)
- Nicole Scherzinger (2014–2015)
- Kerry Ellis (2015)
- Beverley Knight (2015–2016)
- Madalena Alberto (2015–2016)

=== Broadway ===
- Betty Buckley (original cast)
- Laurie Beechman (1984–1988, 1997)
- Loni Ackerman (1988–1991)
- Lillias White (1991–1992)
- Liz Callaway (1993–1999)
- Linda Balgord (1999–2000)
- Leona Lewis (2016)
- Mamie Parris (2016–2017)
- "Tempress" Chasity Moore (Cats: "The Jellicle Ball" 2026)

=== Film ===
- Elaine Paige (1998)
- Jennifer Hudson (2019)

=== Others ===
- Kim Criswell (Los Angeles, 1985)
- Jan Horvath (US tour, 1990)
- Natalie Toro (US tour, 1992 and 1997)
- Dee Roscioli (US tour, 2002)
- Jacquelyn Piro Donovan (US regional, 2003 and 2009)
- Stephanie J. Block (US regional, 2010)
- Taylor Dayne (New York, 2013)
- Paula Lima (Brazil, 2010)
- María del Sol (México, 1991–1992)
- Filippa Giordano (México, 2013)
- Lisset (México, 2014)
- Rocío Banquells (México, 2014)
- Lila Deneken (México)
- Myriam Montemayor Cruz (México)
- Yuri (México, 2018–2019)
- Ute Lemper (Vienna, 1983)
- Maarja-Liis Ilus
- Di Botcher
- Yukimi Shimura (Original Japanese Cast)
- Monica Aspelund (Finland, 1986)
- Pia Douwes (Vienna and The Netherlands, 1987–1989 and 2006)
- Ruth Jacott (Original Netherlands cast, 1987)
- Akiko Kuno (Japan, 1983–85)
- Mikiko Shiraki (Japan)
- Masako Saito (Japan)
- Vera Mann (The Netherlands, 2006)
- Ruthie Henshall
- Yasuko Sado (Japan)
- Sayoko Hayami (Japan)
- Yukie Yokoyama (Japan)
- Yuri Sawa (Japan, 2004)
- Anita Meyer (The Netherlands, 2006)
- Pernilla Wahlgren (Sweden, 2003)
- Rikako Orikasa (Japan, 2007–09, 2010–12, 2013, 2019–2020, 2022)
- Katarína Hasprová (Slovakia, 2016)
- Honoka Suzuki (Japan, 2012–13)
- Aya Kawamura (Japan, 2013–15)
- Joanna Ampil (European Tour 2013, 2016–17)
- Sophia Ragavelas (European Tour 2013–15)
- Kei Miyahara (Japan, 2015)
- Dianne Pilkington (UK tour, 2006)
- Susan McFadden
- Chiaki Kimura (Japan, 2015–2018, 2022)
- Jane McDonald (UK Tour, 2015)
- Anita Louise Combe (UK and European Tour, 2016–2017)
- Chimene Badi (Paris, 2016)
- Nao Matsumoto (Japan, 2016–2020)
- Jenna Lee-James (UK and European Tour, 2017–2019)
- Li-Tong Hsu (International Tour 2019)
- Bev Harrell (Australia/New Zealand), 1989/1990
- Delia Hannah (Australia, 1994, 1999, and 2016)
- Marina Prior (Australia, 2014)
- Delta Goodrem (Australia, 2015–2016)
- Debra Byrne (Original Australian cast, 1985)
- Lea Salonga (Manila, 2010)
- Louise Dearman (Cyprus)
- Erin Cornell (South Korea, Singapore, Macau, 2014-15 / Australia (Standy) 2015-16)
- Masae Ebata (Japan, 2017–2022)
- Shin Youngsook (South Korea, 2008–2009)
- Ock Joo-hyun (South Korea, 2008–2009)
- Insooni (South Korea, 2011–2012)
- Park Hae-mi (South Korea, 2011–2012)
- Silvie Paladino (Malaysia)
- Miki Kanehara (Japan, 2019, 2020–2025)
- Emma Hatton (UK Tour, 2018)
- Lucy O'Byrne (UK Tour, 2018–2019)
- Keri René Fuller (US Tour, 2019–2020)
- Donna Vivino (US Tour, 2020)
- Jacinta Whyte (UK and International Tour, 2021–2022)
- Jacintha Abisheganaden (Singapore, 1993)
- Slindile Nodangala (International Tour 2004)
- Lucy May Barker (International Tour 2024-2025)
- "Tempress" Chasity Moore (Cats: "The Jellicle Ball" off-Broadway 2024)
- Nikki Biddington (International Tour 2025)

== In popular culture ==
Madame Tussauds New York features a wax figure of Grizabella that sings "Memory".
