= Old Possum's Book of Practical Cats =

Book of poems by T. S. Eliot

- First edition cover
- Author: T. S. Eliot
- Language: English
- Genre: Light poetry
- Publication date: 5 October 1939
- Media type: Print

Old Possum's Book of Practical Cats (1939) is a collection of whimsical light poems by T. S. Eliot about feline psychology and sociology, published by Faber and Faber. It serves as the basis for Andrew Lloyd Webber's 1981 musical Cats.

Eliot wrote the poems in the 1930s and included them, under his assumed name "Old Possum", in letters to his godchildren. Eliot tried to persuade the poet Ralph Hodgson to illustrate the poems but failed. They were collected and published in 1939, with cover illustrations by the author, and quickly re-published in 1940, illustrated in full by Nicolas Bentley. They have also been published in versions illustrated by Edward Gorey (1982), Axel Scheffler (2009) and Rebecca Ashdown (2014).

== Contents ==
The contents of Old Possum's Book of Practical Cats, along with the names of the featured cats where appropriate, are:

- "The Naming of Cats"
- "The Old Gumbie Cat" (Jennyanydots)
- "Growltiger's Last Stand"
- "The Rum Tum Tugger"
- "The Song of the Jellicles"
- "Mungojerrie and Rumpleteazer"
- "Old Deuteronomy"
- "(Of) The Awefull Battle of the Pekes and the Pollicles (Together with Some Account of the Participation of the Pugs and the Poms and the Intervention of the Great Rumpus Cat)"
- "Mr. Mistoffelees"
- "Macavity: The Mystery Cat"
- "Gus: The Theatre Cat"
- "Bustopher Jones: The Cat about Town"
- "Skimbleshanks: The Railway Cat"
- "The Ad-dressing of Cats"
- "Cat Morgan Introduces Himself" (added in the 1952 edition)

== Reception ==
According to the Guardian, Old Possum's Book of Practical Cats outsold Eliot's 1922 poem The Waste Land. A 1939 review in the Boston Evening Transcript said "Mr Eliot's light touch is sometimes skillful, sometimes old maid, sometimes mediocre... this book is really for people who love cats, not poetry." Writer Burton Raffel described the book as "pleasant, inoffensive, and unremarkable".

According to the Guardian, at the time the book was published, in 1939, literary critics felt Eliot "had misjudged the nation’s mood" and believed the book was a "significant indiscretion". It said that view changed in 1981 when Andrew Lloyd Webber adapted the book for the stage.

== Adaptations ==
In 1954, English composer Alan Rawsthorne set six of the poems in a work for speaker and orchestra entitled Practical Cats, which was recorded soon afterwards, with the actor Robert Donat as the speaker. At about the same time another English composer, Humphrey Searle, composed another narrated piece based on the poems, using flute, piccolo, cello and guitar. This work, Two Practical Cats, consists of settings of the poems about Macavity and Growltiger.

The best-known musical adaptation of the poems is Andrew Lloyd Webber's musical Cats, which was premiered in the West End of London in 1981 and on Broadway in 1982. It became the longest-running Broadway show in history until it was overtaken by another musical by Lloyd Webber, The Phantom of the Opera. As well as the characters found in the book, Cats introduces several additional characters from Eliot's unpublished drafts, most notably Grizabella. The musical was adapted into a direct-to-video film in 1998. A feature film adaptation of Cats was released on 20 December 2019. As of December, 2019, the feature film's production cost was $100 million but only grossed $38.3 million globally, yielding an approximate $70 million loss.

== Cultural references ==
In the film Logan's Run, Logan and Jessica meet an old man in the ruins of the United States Senate Chamber during their search for Sanctuary. The Old Man has many cats and refers to the poem "The Naming of Cats", explaining that each cat has three names: one common, one fancy and one that only the cat knows. Later the Old Man refers to one cat in particular, "Gus", short for "Asparagus", and goes on to recite parts of "Macavity: the Mystery Cat".

In Tad Williams' feline fantasy novel Tailchaser's Song, cats have three names.

The British rock band Mungo Jerry derived their name from the book's poem "Mungojerrie and Rumpleteazer".

The Tombs, a bar and restaurant in Washington, D.C., is named after the fictional establishment mentioned in the poem "Bustopher Jones: The Cat About Town".

== Comparable work ==
On 5 June 2009, The Times revealed that in 1937 Eliot had composed a 34-line poem entitled "Cows" for the children of Frank Morley, a friend who, like Eliot, was a director of the publishing company Faber and Faber. Morley's daughter, Susanna Smithson, uncovered the poem as part of the BBC Two programme Arena: T.S. Eliot, broadcast that night as part of the BBC Poetry Season.
