= Jellicle cats =

Fictional cats

Jellicle cats are a fictional type of feline from Old Possum's Book of Practical Cats, a 1939 collection of light poetry by T. S. Eliot. Jellicle cats were adapted for the 1981 stage musical Cats by Andrew Lloyd Webber, where the wide array of diverse Jellicles is central to the musical's worldbuilding.

== Origins ==
"Jellicle cats" are briefly mentioned in T. S. Eliot's 1933 poem "Five-Finger Exercises", although they are not described until Eliot's poem "The Song of the Jellicles", depicting the cats as commonly nocturnal, black and white, scruffy cats. Eliot specifically mentions how they gather at an event called the "Jellicle Ball". The name "Jellicle" comes from Eliot's unpublished poem "Pollicle Dogs and Jellicle Cats", where "Pollicle dogs" is a corruption of "poor little dogs" and "Jellicle cats" of "dear little cats".

In contrast with their source material, the Jellicles in Cats possess many kinds of coat-patterns, diverse personalities, and individual talents. Many of the ensemble characters were created by the original 1981 London cast through extensive improvisation sessions held during the rehearsal process. Musical theatre scholar Vagelis Siropoulos noted that the level of detail given to each character was crucial in fleshing out the fantasy world of Cats, with even the minor cats having established personalities, relationships, and hierarchies within the tribe. In the musical, sub-plots involving individual Jellicle cats include the struggle of Grizabella, a former "glamour cat", and the kidnapping of the Jellicle patriarch, Old Deuteronomy.

A total of 54 cat names are given in Old Possum's Book of Practical Cats, most of which Eliot derived from British culture, including references to Anglican traditions, historic and literary figures, as well as geographical locations. When not taken from a corresponding eponymous poem, many of the musical's character names are from Eliot's poem "The Naming of Cats".

== In popular culture ==
The 1976 film Logan's Run has the old man offering one of his Jellicle cats to Logan.

Since 2014, the refrain of "Jellicle Songs for Jellicle Cats" from the musical cast recording has been a running gag on the animated series BoJack Horseman; the refrain plays on a loop as the on-hold music for anthropomorphic cat Princess Carolyn.

The 2017 picture book Jellicle Cats published by Faber and Faber adapts "The Song of the Jellicles" as a standalone poem.

Madame Tussauds New York displays wax figures of some of the musical's Jellicle cats since 2019, including Grizabella who performs “Memory”.

The 2020 Dungeons & Daddies episode "The Jellicle Ball" features a game played with a team of Jellicle cats.

The musical Cats: The Jellicle Ball ran off-Broadway in New York City in 2024 until it moved to the Broadhurst Theatre on Broadway in Spring 2026. The show is a reimagining of the original Cats musical informed by black, queer ballroom culture.
