= The Naming of Cats =

1939 poem by T. S. Eliot

The Naming of Cats is a poem in T. S. Eliot's 1939 poetry book Old Possum's Book of Practical Cats. It was adapted into a musical number in Andrew Lloyd Webber's 1981 musical Cats, and has also been quoted in other films, notably Logan's Run (1976). The poem describes to humans how cats get their names.

== Poem ==
The Naming of Cats (excerpt)

The Naming of Cats is a difficult matter,
It isn't just one of your holiday games;
You may think at first I'm as mad as a hatter
When I tell you, a cat must have THREE DIFFERENT NAMES.
First of all, there's the name that the family use daily,
Such as Peter, Augustus, Alonzo or James,
Such as Victor or Jonathan, George or Bill Bailey--
All of them sensible everyday names.
There are fancier names if you think they sound sweeter,
Some for the gentlemen, some for the dames:
Such as Plato, Admetus, Electra, Demeter--
But all of them sensible everyday names.
But I tell you, a cat needs a name that's particular,

— T. S. Eliot, Old Possum's Book of Practical Cats

The poem uses a short rhythmic dialogue to describe how cats get or choose their names. It states that "a cat must have THREE DIFFERENT NAMES"; specifically, one that is "familiar", one that is "particular", and one that is "secretive". English professor Dorothy Dodge Robbins noted that the many examples of feline names given in the poem by the Missouri-born poet were heavily influenced by his love and adoption of British culture: "After all, his are the monikers of distinctly London cats; they are not the practical names of Midwestern barn cats."

Familial names are typically common human names that the cat's "family use daily". Examples given include "Victor or Jonathan, George or Bill Bailey," the last of which was derived from the 1902 song "Won't You Come Home Bill Bailey". The poem also suggests "fancier" familial names derived from ancient and mythological figures such as "Plato, Admetus, Electra, and Demeter."

Particular names are said to be "peculiar" yet "dignified", and Eliot's examples include the invented names of "Munkustrap, Quaxo, Coricopat, Bombalurina, and Jellylorum." Robbins speculates that the name "Coricopat" was derived as a linguistic variation of the "Calico Cat" from Eugene Field's poem "The Duel".

On the "ineffable" secretive names of cats, Eliot declares that "no human research can discover" them for "THE CAT HIMSELF KNOWS, and will never confess."

== Cats ==
In Cats, "The Naming of Cats" is the second song of the musical. It is entirely spoken and presented as a slow, eerie chant which breaks the fourth wall, acknowledging the audience and explaining to them how cats are given their names. While it is delivered by the cast in unison, whispered in natural rhythmic dialogue, the chant never follows a singsong style as the voices are spoken at different pitches and varying inflections. As the number is performed, cast members venture out into the audience before retreating backstage as the song transitions to Victoria's dance solo.

The music is a fragmented and dissonant variation of a theme introduced in the overture. It has no constant key signature or harmonic structure.

Many of the characters' names are taken from the poem, including Bombalurina, Demeter, and Munkustrap.

== In other media ==
In the 1976 movie Logan's Run, Peter Ustinov's character recites a shortened version of the poem.

Sped-up parts of Eliot's recording of the poem were used in various Shining Time Station Season 1 episodes as phone voices, including "And The Band Played Off".
