= Pouncival =

- Cats character
- First appearance: Cats (1981)
- Created by: Andrew Lloyd Webber
- Based on: Old Possum's Book of Practical Cats by T. S. Eliot

Cast of the filmed version of Cats. Pouncival centre front row.

Pouncival is a character in the musical Cats and in T. S. Eliot's Old Possum's Book of Practical Cats (on which the musical was based). He is brown, white, gray, and black and has a lot of freckles. He is portrayed as a tom between kittenhood and adulthood in most productions of the musical. He is usually played by an actor trained in gymnastics, for he pounces, does leaps and handsprings throughout the production, as well as using the flying trapeze. He has been played by Karl Morgan in the 1998 filmed version, Herman W. Sebek in the original Broadway cast, and by Luke Baxter in the original London production.

Pouncival is essentially the same character as Carbucketty. Over the years the name Carbucketty was used in London, and Pouncival on Broadway and subsequent productions.

== Actors to have played the part ==
Robert Burke (Currently in the closing cast of the North American Tour 2012) Steve Konopelski, Jacob Brent, Trevor Downey, Michael J. Rios, Karl Morgan, Josh Andrews and Caleb Bartolo in the Australian 2010 Tour. Pouncival is played by Sharrod Williams in the 2016 Broadway Revival.
