= Rumpus =

Rumpus may refer to:

- Recreation room, also known under the term "rumpus room"
- Rumpus Cat, a fictional character from T. S. Eliot's Old Possum's Book of Practical Cats and the musical Cats
- Rumpus Magazine, a bi-monthly student tabloid publication at Yale College
- Rumpus McFowl, a Disney comic book character
- The Rumpus, an online literary magazine

== See also ==
- Ruckus (disambiguation)
