= Ruckus =

Ruckus may refer to:

== People with the name ==
- Ruckus (wrestler), ring name of pro wrestler Claude Marrow
- Obe "Rukus" Watson, a member of The Trinity Band who mixes as DJ Rukus

== Arts, entertainment, and media ==
- Ruckus (album), a 2003 album from the group Galactic
- Ruckus (film) a 1981 action-thriller film, starring Dirk Benedict
- Ruckus (game show), a short-lived 1991 syndicated game show with The Amazing Johnathan
- Ruckus, a children's variation of the card game Rummy

=== Fictional characters ===
- Ruckus (comics), a mutant supervillain from Marvel Comics
- Ruckus (Transformers), a Decepticon in the Transformers toy line
- Uncle Ruckus, a character from the comic strip and television show The Boondocks

== Brands and enterprises ==
- Ruckus Network, formerly a provider of digital entertainment services for all American colleges and universities
- Ruckus Networks, formerly known as Ruckus Wireless, a computer networking company selling wired and wireless networking equipment and software
- Honda Ruckus, a model of motor scooter made by Honda

== Organizations ==
- Ruckus Society, an organization that provides training in techniques of political activism

== See also ==
- Rumpus (disambiguation)
