= Cats (musical) =

1981 musical by Andrew Lloyd Webber

- Music: Andrew Lloyd Webber
- Lyrics: T. S. Eliot; Trevor Nunn; Richard Stilgoe
- Basis: Old Possum's Book of Practical Cats by T. S. Eliot
- Premiere: 11 May 1981; 45 years ago: New London Theatre, London, England, U.K.
- Productions: 1981 West End; 1982 Broadway; 2014 West End revival; 2015 West End revival; 2016 Broadway revival; 2026 Broadway revival
- Awards: Laurence Olivier Award for Best New Musical; Tony Award for Best Musical; Tony Award for Best Book of a Musical; Tony Award for Best Original Score

Cats is a sung-through musical with music by Andrew Lloyd Webber. It is based on the 1939 poetry collection Old Possum's Book of Practical Cats by T. S. Eliot. The musical tells the story of a tribe of cats called the Jellicles and the night they make the "Jellicle choice" by deciding which cat will ascend to the Heaviside Layer and come back to a new life. As of 2024, Cats remains the fifth-longest-running Broadway show and the eighth-longest-running West End show.

Lloyd Webber began setting Eliot's poems to music in 1977, and the compositions were first presented as a song cycle in 1980. Producer Cameron Mackintosh then recruited director Trevor Nunn and choreographer Gillian Lynne to turn the songs into a complete musical. Cats opened to positive reviews at the New London Theatre in the West End in 1981 and then to mixed reviews at the Winter Garden Theatre on Broadway in 1982. It won numerous awards including Best Musical at both the Laurence Olivier and Tony Awards. Despite its unusual premise, it initially deterred investors yet turned out to be an unprecedented commercial success with a worldwide gross of US$3.5 billion by 2012.

The London production ran for 21 years and 8,949 performances, while the Broadway production ran for 18 years and 7,485 performances, making Cats the longest-running musical in both theatre districts for a number of years. Cats has since been revived in the West End twice and on Broadway twice. It has also been translated into multiple languages and performed around the world many times. Long-running foreign productions include a 15-year run at the Operettenhaus in Hamburg that played over 6,100 performances, as well as an ongoing run in a purpose-built theatre in Japan that has played over 10,000 performances since it opened in 1983.

Cats started the megamusical phenomenon, establishing a global market for musical theatre and directing the industry's focus to big-budget blockbusters, as well as family and tourist-friendly shows. The musical's profound but polarising influence also reshaped the aesthetic, technology, and marketing of the medium. Cats was adapted into a direct-to-video film in 1998 and a feature film in 2019.

== Background ==
Cats is based on T. S. Eliot's 1939 poetry book Old Possum's Book of Practical Cats, and the songs in the musical consist of Eliot's verse set to music by Andrew Lloyd Webber. The musical is unusual in its construction; along with Eliot's poems, music and dance are the main focus of the show at the expense of a traditional narrative structure. Musicologists William Everett and Paul Laird described Cats as "combining elements of revue and concept musical". The plot centres on a tribe of cats called the Jellicles, as they come together at the annual Jellicle Ball to decide which one of them will ascend to the Heaviside Layer (their version of heaven) and be reborn into a new life. The bulk of the musical consists of the different contenders being introduced, either by themselves or by other cats.

=== Poems ===
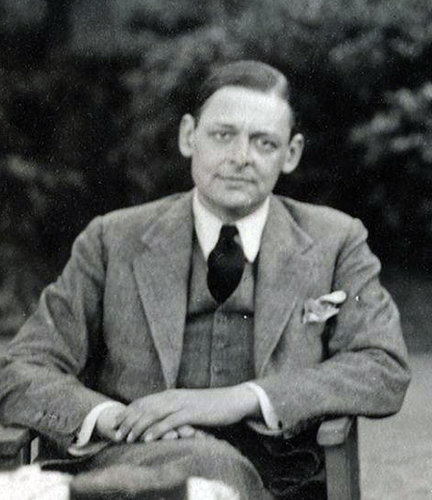
Eliot's poetry provided most of the lyrics for Cats

Old Possum's Book of Practical Cats is a collection of light poetry about cats that Eliot had originally written for his godchildren in the 1930s. Due to the rhythmic nature of Eliot's work, there had been previous attempts before Cats at setting his poems to music, though none of these attempts had been met with much critical or commercial success. John Snelson, a musicologist, wrote of the poems:

[They] provided excellent material for musicalization, as Eliot's style in this collection is reminiscent of a popular lyricist. The poet uses repeated catch phrases, strong hooks, steady rhythm and outrageous, attention-grabbing, witty rhymes, which are the ingredients of every well-crafted popular lyric.

Most of the lyrics in Cats were adapted from Old Possum's Book of Practical Cats, with only minor alterations. Additional verses from Eliot's unpublished poems were adapted for "Grizabella: The Glamour Cat" and "The Journey to the Heaviside Layer", while "The Moments of Happiness" drew from a passage in Eliot's The Dry Salvages. Director Trevor Nunn and lyricist Richard Stilgoe provided the remaining lyrics, namely for the opening number "Jellicle Songs for Jellicle Cats" and the most famous song from the musical: "Memory". The former was written by Nunn and Stilgoe and was modelled after an unpublished poem by Eliot titled "Pollicle Dogs and Jellicle Cats", while the latter was written by Nunn based on another Eliot poem titled "Rhapsody on a Windy Night". Other lines in the song were taken from Eliot's "Preludes".

== Creation ==
=== Inception ===
Lloyd Webber began composing the songs in late 1977 as a songwriting exercise, partly because Eliot's book had been a childhood favourite and partly to see if he could write music to predetermined lyrics. The compositions were performed privately for friends but Lloyd Webber had no further intentions for them at the time. After his song cycle Tell Me on a Sunday was televised by the BBC in early 1980, Lloyd Webber began to consider using his musicalization of Eliot's poems in the same vein for a televised concert anthology. He approached producer Cameron Mackintosh to explore possible avenues for the songs.

Practical Cats, as the show was then called, was first presented as a song cycle at the 1980 summer Sydmonton Festival. The concert was performed by Gemma Craven, Gary Bond and Paul Nicholas. Eliot's widow and literary executor, Valerie, was in attendance and brought along various unpublished cat-themed poems by Eliot. One of these was "Grizabella the Glamour Cat" which, although rejected from Eliot's book for being "too sad for children", gave Lloyd Webber the idea for a full-blown musical. He explained:

The musical and dramatic images that this created for me made me feel that there was very much more to the project than I had realised. I immediately decided that I needed the support of another to encourage me to re-work my settings and to see if a dramatic whole could be woven from the delightful verse that I was now to be allowed to develop.

Lloyd Webber thus decided to turn Practical Cats into a musical, co-produced by Mackintosh and the Really Useful Group's Brian Brolly.

=== Development ===
Shortly after the Sydmonton Festival, Lloyd Webber began setting the unpublished poems he had been given to music, a few of which were later added into the show. He also composed the overture and "The Jellicle Ball", incorporating analog synthesizers into these orchestrations to try to create a unique electronic soundscape. Meanwhile, Mackintosh recruited Nunn, the then artistic director of the Royal Shakespeare Company (RSC), to direct Practical Cats. Nunn was an unusual choice as he was considered "too high-brow" for musical theatre, but Mackintosh felt that a "pedigree" director was needed to ensure Valerie Eliot's approval of the project. After much persuasion, Nunn came on board and was joined by his RSC colleagues, choreographer Gillian Lynne and set and costume designer John Napier. Nunn initially envisioned Practical Cats as a chamber piece for five actors and two pianos, which he felt would reflect "Eliot's charming, slightly offbeat, mildly satiric view of late-1930s London". However, he yielded to Lloyd Webber's more ambitious vision for the musical. Nunn was also convinced that for the musical to have the wide commercial appeal that the producers desired, it could not remain as a series of isolated numbers but instead had to have a narrative through line. He was therefore tasked with piecing the self-contained poems together into a story. Nunn wrote about the significance "Grizabella the Glamour Cat" had on the construction of the narrative:

Here in eight lines Eliot was describing an intensely recognizable character with powerful human resonances, while introducing the themes of mortality, and the past, which occur repeatedly in the major poems. We decided that if Eliot had thought of being serious, touching, almost tragic in his presentation of a feline character, then we had to be doing a show which could contain that material, and the implications of it. Furthermore, we would have to achieve the sense of progression through themes more than incidents.

An event called the Jellicle Ball was referenced by Eliot in the poem "The Song of the Jellicles", while a cat version of heaven known as the Heaviside Layer was mentioned in one of his unpublished poems. Nunn expanded on these concepts by conceiving the Jellicle Ball as an annual ritual in which the cats vie to be chosen to ascend to the Heaviside Layer, thus giving the characters a reason to gather and sing about themselves in the musical. He also added the element of rebirth as a play on the idea that cats have nine lives.

One of Nunn's stipulations for agreeing to direct Practical Cats was that actress Judi Dench would be cast in the musical. Lloyd Webber was happy to oblige given her credentials and so Dench joined the company in the dual roles of Grizabella and Jennyanydots. Former Royal Ballet principal dancer Wayne Sleep was offered the part of Mr. Mistoffelees after Lloyd Webber and Mackintosh attended a performance by his dance troupe, one of the many dance showcases they saw in preparation for the musical. Casting for the other roles began in November 1980, with auditions held across the UK for dancers who could also sing and act. There was an initial disagreement over the casting of Paul Nicholas as Rum Tum Tugger; Nunn had misgivings about the actor's easy-going attitude but eventually yielded to Lloyd Webber, Mackintosh and Lynne, all of whom were keen on Nicholas for the role. Sarah Brightman, who had already made a name for herself with the chart hit "I Lost My Heart to a Starship Trooper", arranged a private audition and was cast in an as-then undecided role. By December, the full cast had been assembled.

Meanwhile, Mackintosh engaged the advertising agency Dewynters to design a poster for the musical. After much back-and-forth, the agency presented a minimalist poster consisting of a pair of yellow feline eyes (with dancing silhouettes for the pupils) set against a black backdrop. The producers and the creative team loved the design but felt that the title — Practical Cats — looked out of place when paired with the image of the cat's eyes. The musical's title was thus shortened to just Cats.

The musical was scheduled to open on 30 April 1981, with previews starting on 22 April. Shortly before tickets went on sale in mid-February, Nunn revealed to the alarmed producers that he was struggling to write the script for the musical. Despite still having no established book or score, rehearsals began on 9 March 1981 in a church hall in Chiswick, London. The situation improved later that day when Lloyd Webber, Mackintosh and Nunn met with Richard Stilgoe, a musician known for his ability to improvise lyrics on the spot, in hopes that Stilgoe could write an opening song for the musical. By the next evening, Stilgoe had produced a draft for "Jellicle Songs for Jellicle Cats". However, "Memory", an 11 o'clock number for Grizabella that Nunn insisted the show needed as its "emotional centre", still had no lyrics at this point. Lloyd Webber's former writing partner Tim Rice was brought in to write a lyric for the song, but his version was rejected by Nunn for being too depressing. The lyrics for "Memory" were not completed by Nunn until well into the previews.

The original 1981 London cast of Cats

Many of the ensemble characters were created by the original cast through extensive improvisation sessions held during the rehearsal process. Said Nunn: "[O]n day one of rehearsals what we had was 15 poems set to music and five weeks later we had a show with characters, relationships and stories running from beginning to end." The production faced a last minute mishap when Dench snapped her Achilles tendon during rehearsals for "The Old Gumbie Cat" and had to pull out one week before the first preview. Shortly after this, the original music director, Chris Walker, also had to leave the production for medical reasons and was replaced by the film conductor Harry Rabinowitz. Dench's understudy Myra Sands replaced her as Jennyanydots, while Elaine Paige agreed to take over the role of Grizabella. Opening night was pushed back to 11 May, but Mackintosh refused to postpone the previews as he wanted to dispel the industry rumours that the production was an impending debacle.

The development of Cats was also plagued by financial troubles. Mackintosh struggled to raise the £450,000 (US$1.16 million) needed to stage the musical in the West End as major investors were sceptical of the show's premise and refused to back it. Lloyd Webber personally underwrote the musical and took out a second mortgage on his house for the down payment of the theatre. He later recalled that if Cats had been a commercial failure, it would have left him in financial ruin. The remaining capital was eventually raised by small investments procured from 220 individuals through newspaper advertisements. After the musical became a massive hit, the rate of return for these investors was estimated to have exceeded 3,500 per cent.

== Plot ==
=== Act I – When Cats Are Maddened by the Midnight Dance ===
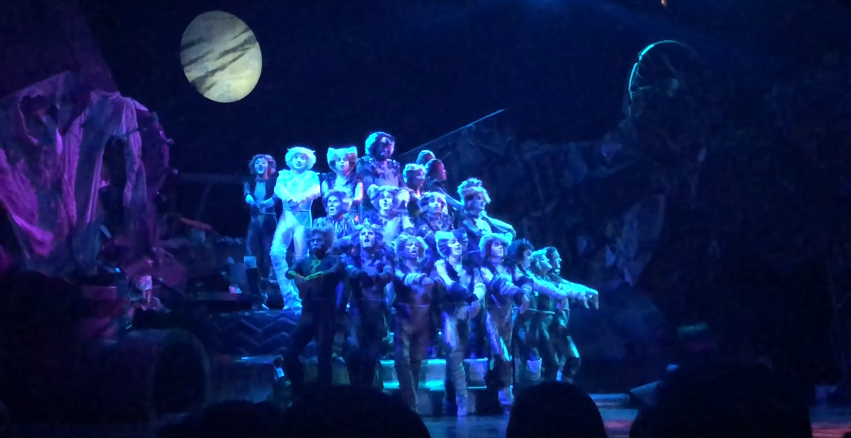
The Jellicle cats gather every year to make the "Jellicle choice" and decide which cat will ascend to the Heaviside Layer and come back to a new life.

After the overture, a tribe of cats known as the Jellicles gather on stage and describe themselves and their purpose ("Jellicle Songs for Jellicle Cats"). The cats (who break the fourth wall throughout the show) then notice that they are being watched by a human audience, and proceed to explain how the different cats of the tribe are named ("The Naming of Cats"). This is followed by a ballet solo performed by Victoria to signal the beginning of the Jellicle Ball ("The Invitation to the Jellicle Ball"). At this moment, Munkustrap, the show's main narrator, explains that tonight the Jellicle patriarch Old Deuteronomy will make an appearance and choose one of the cats to be reborn into a new life on the Heaviside Layer.

Munkustrap introduces the first contender Jennyanydots ("The Old Gumbie Cat"), a large tabby cat who lazes around all day, but come nighttime, she becomes active, teaching mice and cockroaches various activities to curb their naturally destructive habits. Just as Jennyanydots finishes her song, the music changes suddenly and Rum Tum Tugger makes his extravagant entrance in front of the tribe ("The Rum Tum Tugger"). He is very fickle and unappeasable, "for he will do as he do do, and there's no doing anything about it".

Then, as Rum Tum Tugger's song fades, a shabby old grey cat stumbles out wanting to be reconciled; it is Grizabella. All the cats back away from her in fear and disgust and explain her unfortunate state ("Grizabella: The Glamour Cat"). Grizabella leaves and the music changes to a cheerful upbeat number as Bustopher Jones, a fat cat in "a coat of fastidious black", is brought to the stage ("Bustopher Jones: The Cat About Town"). Bustopher Jones is among the elite of the cats, and visits prestigious gentlemen's clubs. Suddenly, a loud crash startles the tribe and the cats run offstage in fright. Hushed giggling sounds signal the entrance of Mungojerrie and Rumpleteazer, a pair of near-identical cats. They are mischievous petty burglars who enjoy causing trouble around their human neighbourhood ("Mungojerrie and Rumpleteazer"). After they finish, they are caught off-guard and confronted by the rest of the cats.

Finally, the Jellicle patriarch, Old Deuteronomy, arrives before the tribe ("Old Deuteronomy"). He is a wise old cat who "has lived many lives" and is tasked with choosing which Jellicle will go to the Heaviside Layer every year. The cats put on a play for Old Deuteronomy ("The Awefull Battle of the Pekes and the Pollicles"), telling a story about two dog tribes clashing in the street and subsequently being scared away by the Great Rumpus Cat. A moral from Old Deuteronomy is interrupted by a second loud crash, presumably from Macavity, which sends the alarmed cats scurrying. After a quick patrol for Macavity, Old Deuteronomy deems it a false alarm and summons the cats back as the main celebration begins ("The Jellicle Ball"), in which the cats sing and display their "Terpsichorean powers".

During the Ball, Grizabella reappears and tries to dance along, but her age and decrepit condition prevent her from doing so ("Grizabella: The Glamour Cat (Reprise)"). As a result, she is once again shunned by the other cats, but that does not stop her from vowing to return for another chance to be in the spotlight while a guilty Old Deuteronomy looks on ("Memory (Prelude)").

=== Act II – Why Will the Summer Day Delay – When Will Time Flow Away? ===
After the Jellicle Ball, Old Deuteronomy gathers his tribe to contemplate the nature of happiness. Jemima (also known as Sillabub), the youngest of all Jellicles, understands the patriarch is referring to Grizabella, and passes the message on to the rest of the tribe ("The Moments of Happiness"). Gus – short for Asparagus – shuffles forward as the next cat to be introduced ("Gus: The Theatre Cat"). He was once a famous actor but is now old and "suffers from palsy which makes his paws shake". He is accompanied by Jellylorum, his caretaker, who tells of his exploits. Gus then remembers how he once played the infamous pirate captain, Growltiger ("Growltiger's Last Stand"). He tells of Growltiger's romance with Lady Griddlebone, leading to the pirate's capture by a horde of Siamese cats and his execution by walking the plank.

Back in the present, after Gus exits, Skimbleshanks is seen sleeping in the corner ("Skimbleshanks: The Railway Cat"). He is the cat who is unofficially in charge of the nightly train from London to Gallowgate, and it will not depart unless he is aboard. Within his song, a whole steam train engine is assembled out of objects in the junkyard.

With a third crash and an evil laugh, the "most wanted" cat Macavity appears. He is the so-called "Napoleon of Crime" who always manages to evade the authorities. Macavity's henchmen capture Old Deuteronomy and take off with the patriarch in tow. As Munkustrap and his troop give chase, Demeter and Bombalurina explain what they know about Macavity ("Macavity: The Mystery Cat"). When they are finished, Macavity returns disguised as Old Deuteronomy, but his cover is blown by Demeter and he ends up getting beaten by Munkustrap and Alonzo. Macavity holds his own for a time, but as the rest of the tribe begin to gang up and surround him, he shorts out the stage lights and escapes in the resulting confusion.

After the fight, Rum Tum Tugger calls upon the magician Mr. Mistoffelees for help ("Magical Mr. Mistoffelees"). Known as the "original conjuring cat", Mr. Mistoffelees can perform feats of magic that no other cat can do. He displays his magical powers in a dance solo and uses them to restore the lights and bring back Old Deuteronomy. Now, the "Jellicle choice" can be made.

Before Old Deuteronomy can make his decision, Grizabella returns to the junkyard and he allows her to address the gathering. Her faded appearance and lonely disposition have little effect on her song ("Memory"). With acceptance and encouragement from Jemima and Victoria, her appeal succeeds and she is chosen to be the one to go to the Heaviside Layer and be reborn into a new Jellicle life ("The Journey to the Heaviside Layer"). A tyre rises from the piles of junk, carrying Grizabella and Old Deuteronomy partway towards the sky; Grizabella then completes the journey on her own. (Note: The method in which Grizabella ascends to the Heaviside Layer varies depending on the production. In the original London and Broadway productions, she climbs up a stairway that emerges from the ceiling. In the 1990s and 2000s scaled-down touring productions, she ascends via a flying saucer-like vessel.) Finally, Old Deuteronomy closes the show by giving his final speech to the audience ("The Ad-dressing of Cats").

== Music ==
=== Musical numbers ===
Act I

- "Overture" – Orchestra
- "Prologue: Jellicle Songs for Jellicle Cats" – The Company
- "The Naming of Cats" – Asparagus, Munkustrap, The Company
- "The Invitation to the Jellicle Ball" – Victoria, Quaxo, Munkustrap, Company
- "The Old Gumbie Cat" – Jennyanydots, Munkustrap, Bombalurina, Jellylorum, Demeter, Company
- "The Rum Tum Tugger" – Rum Tum Tugger, Quaxo, Bombalurina, Company
- "Grizabella: The Glamour Cat" – Grizabella, Demeter, Bombalurina, Company
- "Bustopher Jones: The Cat About Town" – Bustopher Jones, Jennyanydots, Bombalurina, Jellylorum, Company
- "Mungojerrie and Rumpleteazer" – Mungojerrie, Rumpleteazer, Company
- "Old Deuteronomy" – Munkustrap, Rum Tum Tugger, Old Deuteronomy, Company
- "The Awefull Battle of the Pekes and the Pollicles"† – Munkustrap, Rumpus Cat and Company
- "The Jellicle Ball"‡ – The Company
- "Grizabella: The Glamour Cat (Reprise)" – Jellylorum and Jemima
- "Memory (Prelude)" – Grizabella

Act II

- "The Moments of Happiness" – Old Deuteronomy, Jemima, Company
- "Gus: The Theatre Cat" – Asparagus, Jellylorum
- "Growltiger's Last Stand" (including "The Ballad of Billy M'Caw" or "In Una Tepida Notte")† – Growltiger, Griddlebone, Genghis, The Crew, Company
- "Skimbleshanks: The Railway Cat" – Skimbleshanks and Company
- "Macavity: The Mystery Cat" – Demeter, Bombalurina, Girls
- "Mr. Mistoffelees" – Mr. Mistoffelees, Rum Tum Tugger, and Company
- "Memory" – Grizabella, Jemima
- "The Journey to the Heaviside Layer" – The Company
- "Finale: The Ad-Dressing of Cats" – Old Deuteronomy and Company

†"Growltiger's Last Stand" has been dropped from US and UK productions since 2016, with "The Awefull Battle of the Pekes and the Pollicles" moving to Act II to replace it.
‡Also credited as "Song of the Jellicles and the Jellicle Ball".

=== Orchestration ===
Based on the definitive 16-piece licensed version.

- Woodwind I: flute, tenor saxophone, soprano saxophone
- Woodwind II: B♭ clarinet, baritone saxophone, flute
- Woodwind III: oboe, cor anglais
- Horn I
- Horn II
- Trumpet I: B♭ trumpet, piccolo trumpet
- Trumpet II: B♭ trumpet, flugelhorn
- Trombone: B♭
- Keyboard I
- Keyboard II
- Keyboard III
- Percussion
- Cello
- Guitar: electric, acoustic
- Electric upright bass
- Drums

The size of the orchestra varies between productions: Tours normally use reduced orchestrations, while theaters might use their bigger in-house orchestras. The 2019 Vienna production set a new record with a 27-piece score worked out by Andrew Lloyd-Webber himself.

== Characters ==
Cats is an ensemble show with a large supporting cast and no leads.

=== Featured ===
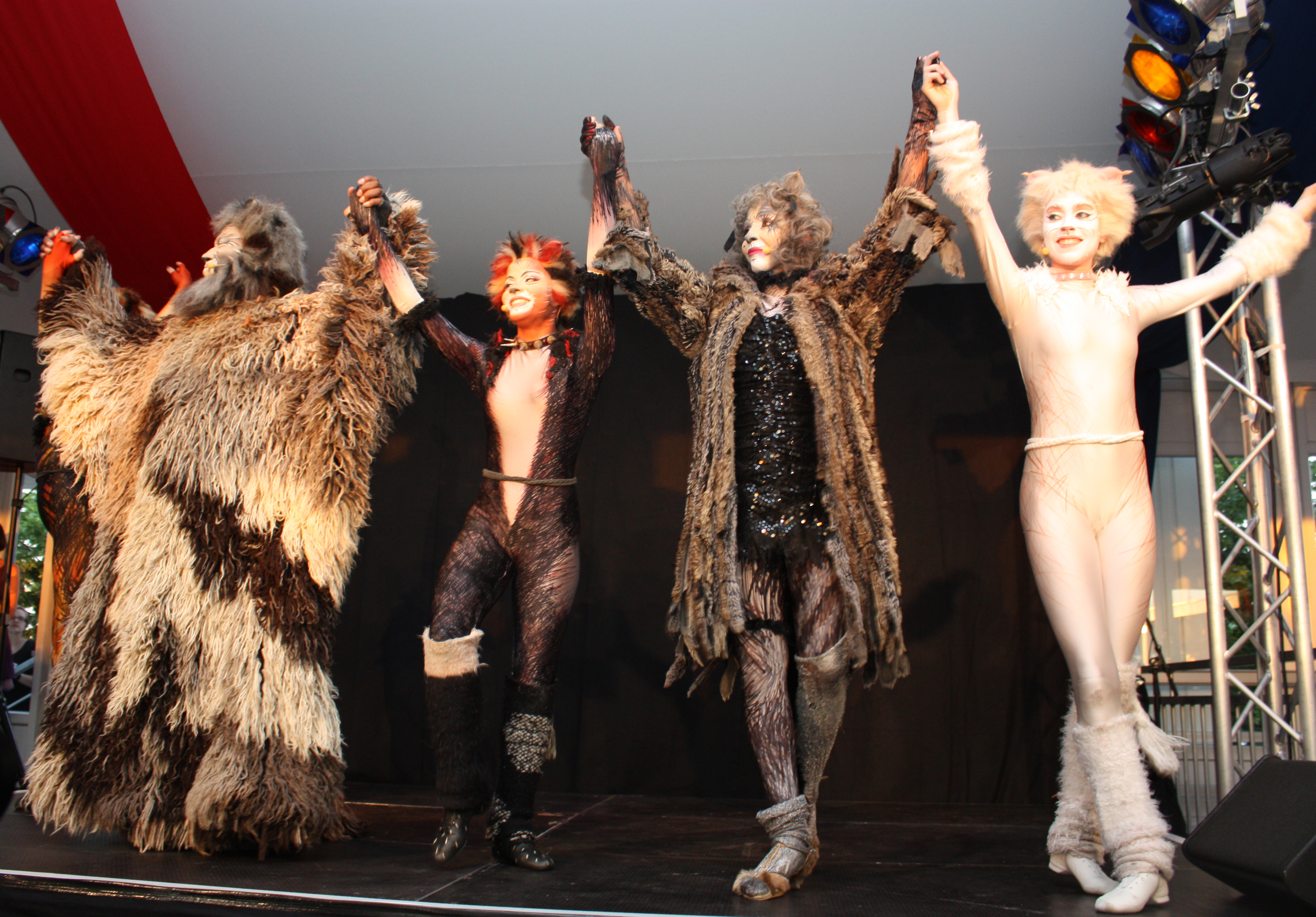
From left to right: Old Deuteronomy, Jemima, Grizabella and Victoria during an event in Germany, 2011.

Characters who are featured singers and/or dancers:

- Asparagus (Gus) a.k.a. the Theatre Cat – A frail elderly cat who used to be a famous stage actor.
- Bombalurina – A flirty and confident red queen; she is best friends with Demeter and the two share an intense hatred for Macavity.
- Bustopher Jones a.k.a. the Cat About Town – A fat upper-class cat with a carefully-groomed black coat and white markings on his legs that resemble spats. Respected by all, he is a cat of leisure who frequents gentlemen's clubs for their fine dining. In most productions, the actor playing Gus also plays Bustopher, though in early productions the part was handled by the actor playing Old Deuteronomy.
- Demeter – A troubled and skittish queen; she is best friends with Bombalurina and the two share an intense hatred for Macavity.
- Grizabella – A former Glamour Cat, ostracised by the Jellicles, who has lost her sparkle and now only wants to be accepted.
- Jellylorum – A motherly caretaker who watches out for the kittens and looks after Gus.
- Jemima/Sillabub – The youngest kitten. Idealistic and jovial, she is sympathetic to Grizabella's plight.
- Jennyanydots a.k.a. the Old Gumbie Cat – She sits around all day and is seemingly very lazy, but at night, she becomes very active as she rules the mice and cockroaches, forcing them to undertake helpful functions and creative projects to curb their naturally destructive habits.
- Macavity a.k.a. the Mystery Cat – A notorious criminal known as the "Napoleon of Crime". Usually played by the actor playing Admetus/Plato.
- Mr. Mistoffelees – A young black-and-white tuxedo tom learning to control his magical powers. He is a featured dancer, performing his signature "Conjuring Turn" (twenty-four consecutive fouettés en tournant) during his number. Mistoffelees' chorus identity is sometimes known as Quaxo.
- Mungojerrie – A mischievous troublemaker, he is one-half of a notorious duo of cat-burglars along with Rumpleteazer.
- Munkustrap – A grey tabby tomcat who is the storyteller and protector of the Jellicle tribe. He is Old Deuteronomy's second-in-command and the show's main narrator.
- Old Deuteronomy – The wise and benevolent elderly Jellicle leader who is beloved by his tribe.
- Rumpleteazer – A mischievous troublemaker, she is one half of a notorious duo of cat-burglars along with Mungojerrie.
- Rum Tum Tugger – A flashy and unappeasable cat who loves to be the centre of attention.
- Skimbleshanks a.k.a. the Railway Cat – An upbeat and active orange tabby cat, who lives on the mail trains and acts as an unofficial chaperone to such an extent he is considered rather indispensable to the train and station employees.
- Victoria – A demure and graceful white kitten. She is a featured dancer, opening with a ballet solo after "The Naming of the Cats" and is the first character to touch Grizabella.

=== Others ===
Other characters who have appeared in multiple notable productions include:

- Admetus/Plato – The chorus identity of Macavity. He is a teenage ginger-and-white young tom, and is typically paired with Victoria in a pas de deux during the Jellicle Ball.
- Alonzo – A black-and-white tom. He is vain, insecure and full of bravado.
- Bill Bailey/Tumblebrutus – A playful tom kitten, often performing acrobatics as well as being a strong dancer. His costume consists of brown patches (including a brown eye patch) on a white base.
- Carbucketty/Pouncival – A playful and acrobatic brown-and-white tom kitten.
- Cassandra – An elegant and aloof brown pointed queen.
- Coricopat and Tantomile – Mysterious twin brother and sister with psychic abilities.
- Electra – A reserved and solemn tortoiseshell kitten. Her costume is brown, red and black.
- Etcetera – An exuberant and immature tabby kitten. Her costume is white, black and brown.
- Griddlebone – Growltiger's lover in "Growltiger's Last Stand", in which she sings "The Ballad of Billy M'Caw" or the mock Italian aria "In Una Tepida Notte" (depending on production). Usually played by the actress playing Jellylorum.
- Growltiger – A theatrical character Gus recalls playing in his youth, and who appears in Gus' memory during "Growltiger's Last Stand". In some productions he is portrayed as a vicious pirate; in others, he is more comical. Usually played by the actor playing Gus.
- Rumpus Cat – A spiky-haired cat with glowing red eyes, seen as a sort of superhero figure in "The Awefull Battle of the Pekes and the Pollicles" despite his ineptness. Usually played by one of the male ensemble characters in the play within the musical.

== Notable cast ==
Role (Note: All roles are listed alphabetically, with the exception of those shared by the same actor in two or more productions)	West End	Broadway	West End revival	West End revival	Broadway revival	Broadway revival
Role	1981	1982	2014	2015	2016	2026
Admetus/Plato	Steven Wayne	Kenneth Ard	Cameron Ball	Javier Cid	Daniel Gaymon	—N/a
Macavity	John Thornton	Kenneth Ard	Cameron Ball	Javier Cid	Daniel Gaymon	Leiomy
Alonzo	Roland Alexander	Héctor Jaime Mercado	Adam Lake	Jack Butterworth	Ahmad Simmons	—N/a
Asparagus (Gus)	Stephen Tate	Stephen Hanan	Paul F. Monaghan	Paul F. Monaghan	Christopher Gurr	Junior LaBeija
Growltiger	Stephen Tate	Stephen Hanan	Paul F. Monaghan	Paul F. Monaghan	—N/a	—N/a
Bustopher Jones	Brian Blessed	Stephen Hanan	Paul F. Monaghan	Paul F. Monaghan	Christopher Gurr	Nora Schell
Bill Bailey	Peter Barry	Robert Hoshour	Adam Salter	Jon-Scott Clark	Kolton Krouse	—N/a
Tumblebrutus	Peter Barry	Robert Hoshour	Adam Salter	Jon-Scott Clark	Kolton Krouse	Primo Thee Ballerino
Bombalurina	Geraldine Gardner	Donna King	Charlene Ford	Emma Lee Clark	Christine Cornish Smith	Garnet Williams
Carbucketty	Luke Baxter	Steven Gelfer	Joel Morris	Luke Cinque-White	Giuseppe Bausilio	—N/a
Cassandra	Seeta Indrani	René Ceballos	Cassie Clare	Danielle Cato	Emily Pynenburg	Emma Sofia
Coricopat	Donald Waugh	René Clemente	Benjamin Mundy	James Titchener	Corey John Snide	—N/a
Demeter	Sharon Lee-Hill	Wendy Edmead	Zizi Strallen	Anna Woodside	Kim Fauré	Bebe Nicole Simpson
Electra	Anita Pashley	—N/a	—N/a	—N/a	Lili Froehlich	—N/a
Etcetera	Julie Edmett	Christine Langner	—N/a	—N/a	—N/a	Kya Azeen
George/Pouncival	John Chester	Herman W. Sebek	Stevie Hutchinson	Jordan Shaw	Sharrod Williams	—N/a
Griddlebone	Susan Jane Tanner	Bonnie Simmons	Clare Rickard	Clare Rickard	—N/a	—N/a
Jellylorum	Susan Jane Tanner	Bonnie Simmons	Clare Rickard	Clare Rickard	Sara Jean Ford	Bryson Battle
Grizabella	Elaine Paige	Betty Buckley	Nicole Scherzinger	Beverley Knight	Leona Lewis	"Tempress" Chasity Moore
Jemima/Sillabub	Sarah Brightman	Whitney Kershaw	Natasha Mould	Tarryn Gee	Arianna Rosario	Teddy Wilson Jr.
Jennyanydots	Myra Sands	Anna McNeeley	Laurie Scarth	Jane Quinn	Eloise Kropp	Xavier Reyes
Mr. Mistoffelees	Wayne Sleep (Note: Also credited as "Quaxo" (chorus cat))	Timothy Scott	Joseph Poulton	Mark John Richardson	Ricky Ubeda	Robert "Silk" Mason
Mungojerrie	John Thornton	René Clemente	Benjamin Yates	Harry Francis	Jess LeProtto	Jonathan Burke
Munkustrap	Jeff Shankley	Harry Groener	Callum Train	Matt Krzan	Andy Huntington Jones	Dudney Joseph Jr.
Old Deuteronomy	Brian Blessed	Ken Page	Nicholas Pound	Adam Linstead	Quentin Earl Darrington (Note: Also credited as "Victor" (chorus cat))	André De Shields
Rum Tum Tugger	Paul Nicholas	Terrence Mann	Antoine Murray-Straughan	Marcquelle Ward	Tyler Hanes	Sydney James Harcourt
Rumpleteazer	Bonnie Langford	Christine Langner	Dawn Williams	Georgie Leatherland	Shonica Gooden	Dava Huesca
Rumpus Cat	Roland Alexander	Kenneth Ard	Adam Lake	Jack Butterworth	Christopher Gurr	—N/a
Skimbleshanks	Kenn Wells	Reed Jones	Ross Finnie	Evan James	Jeremy Davis	Emma Sofia
Tantomile	Femi Taylor	Janet Hubert-Whitten	Kathryn Barnes	Gabrielle Cocca	Emily Tate	—N/a
Victoria	Finola Hughes	Cynthia Onrubia	Hannah Kenna Thomas	Hannah Kenna Thomas	Georgina Pazcoguin	Baby Byrne

=== Notable replacements ===
Notable replacements from the musical's West End and Broadway runs:

==== West End ====
- Admetus/Macavity: Richard Armitage (1994–1995)
- Alonzo: Warren Carlyle (1992), Steven Houghton (1993), Jason Gardiner (1997), Chris Jarvis (2001–2002)
- Asparagus/Bustopher Jones/Growltiger: Paul Bentley (1988), Mark Wynter (1990–1992), Peter Polycarpou (2001–2002)
- Bill Bailey: Michael Sundin (1982)
- Bombalurina: Femi Taylor (1984–1985), Janie Dee (1990), Donna King (1992)
- Coricopat: Danny John-Jules (1983)
- Demeter: Erin Lordan (1985), Louise Fribo (1994–1995)
- Electra: Sarah-Jane Honeywell (1993–1994)
- Etcetera: Sarah-Jane Honeywell (2001–2002)
- Grizabella: Angela Richards (1982), Marti Webb (1983), Anita Harris (1985–1986), Clare Burt (1993), Rosemarie Ford (1995), Diane Langton (1996), Stephanie Lawrence (1997), Sally Ann Triplett (1998), Chrissie Hammond (1999–2002), Kerry Ellis (revival; 2015), Madalena Alberto (revival; 2015–2016)
- Jellylorum/Griddlebone: Rebecca Lock (2000–2001)
- Jemima: Ruthie Henshall (1987–1989), Louise Fribo (1996), Veerle Casteleyn (1998–1999)
- Jennyanydots: Ann Emery (1983–1986)
- Mistoffelees: Gen Horiuchi (1998), Louie Spence (1999), Jacob Brent (2001)
- Munkustrap: David Burt (1982), Gary Martin (1987–1990), Steven Houghton (1994)
- Old Deuteronomy: John Turner (1983–1985), John Rawnsley (1995–1997), Dave Willetts (2001), Junix Inocian (2001–2002)
- Rum Tum Tugger: John Partridge (1995, 2001–2002), Tommie Earl Jenkins (1997–1998)
- Rumpleteazer: Anna-Jane Casey (1988–1990), Jo Gibb (1996–1997)
- Victoria: Phyllida Crowley Smith (1992–1993)

==== Broadway ====
- Alonzo: Scott Wise (1984)
- Bustopher Jones/Asparagus/Growltiger: Tim Jerome (1984–1986), Gregg Edelman (1986)
- Cassandra: Charlotte d'Amboise (1984–1985)
- Demeter: Lena Hall (1999–2000)
- Grizabella: Laurie Beechman (1984–1988, 1997), Loni Ackerman (1988–1991), Lillias White (1991–1992), Liz Callaway (1993–1999), Linda Balgord (1999–2000)
- Jennyanydots: Sharon Wheatley (1999–2000)
- Mistoffelees: Gen Horiuchi (1991–1993, 1995–1996), Jacob Brent (1996–1999), Christopher Gattelli (1999)
- Munkustrap: Rob Marshall (1987), Bryan Batt (1991–1992), Michael Gruber (1996–1997, 1999), Jeffry Denman (1999–2000)
- Old Deuteronomy: Walter Charles (u/s), Bill Nolte (u/s)
- Plato/Macavity/Rumpus Cat: Scott Wise (1983)
- Pouncival: Robert Montano (1985–1987), Christopher Gattelli (1996–1998, 1999–2000)
- Rum Tum Tugger: David Hibbard (1993–1996, 1997–1999), Stephen Bienskie (1999–2000)
- Rumpleteazer: Jennifer Cody (1994)
- Tumblebrutus: Randy Bettis (1990–1991, 1996–1998)

== Artistic elements ==
=== Musical treatment ===
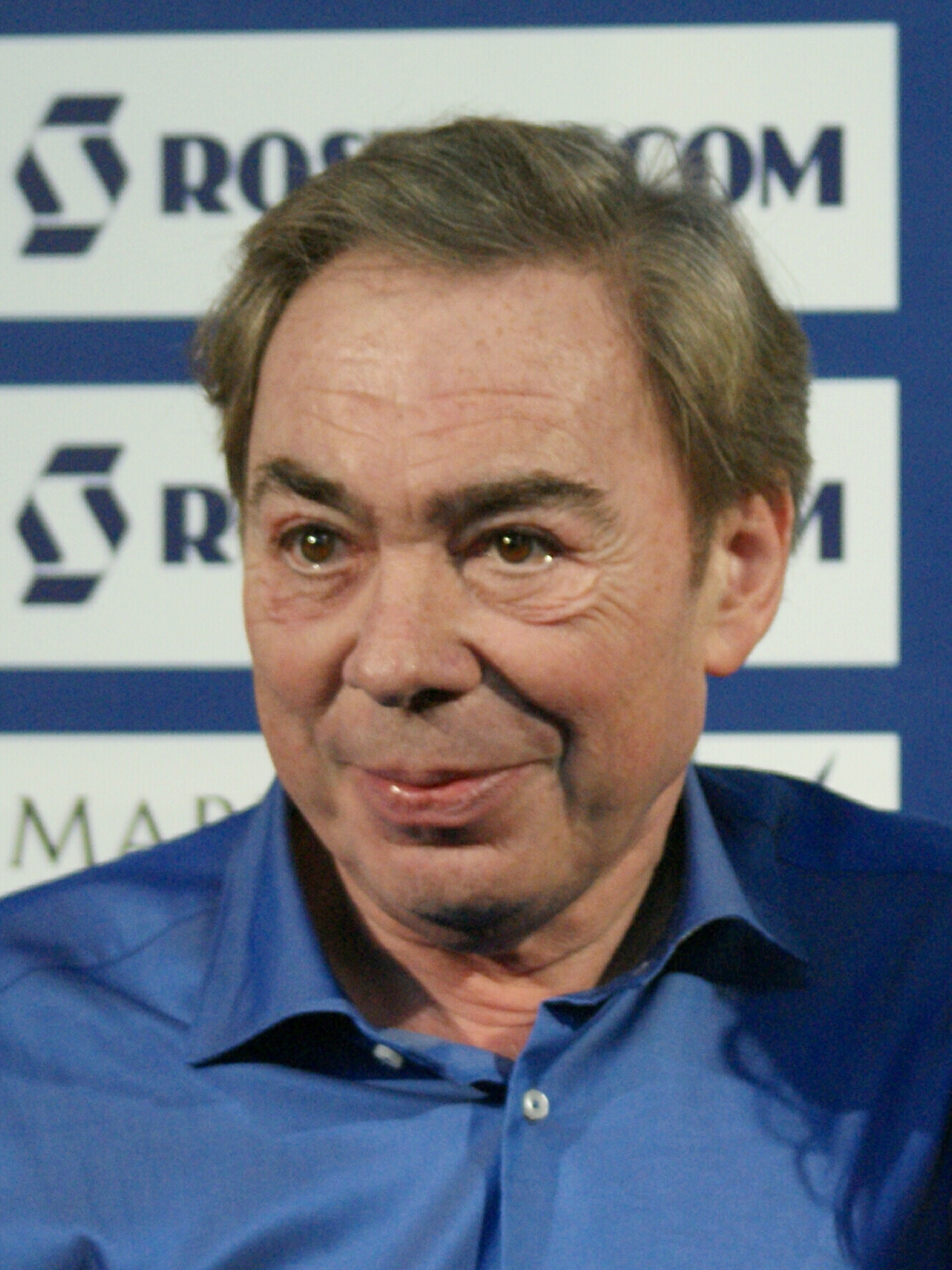
Andrew Lloyd Webber

Cats is completely told through music with no dialogue in between the songs, although there are occasions when the music accompanies spoken verse. Lloyd Webber's compositions employ an eclectic range of musical styles so as to magnify the characters' contrasting personalities. For example, the rebellious Rum Tum Tugger is introduced with a rock song ("The Rum Tum Tugger"); the fallen Grizabella is accompanied by a dramatic operatic aria ("Grizabella: The Glamour Cat"); Old Deuteronomy makes his grand entrance to a lullaby-turned-anthem ("Old Deuteronomy"); and Gus' nostalgia for the past is reflected through an old-fashioned music hall number ("Gus: The Theatre Cat"). Many of the songs are pastiches of their respective genres, which Snelson attributes to the show's origins as a song cycle:

The original concept of a set of contrasting numbers, without a dramatic narrative, meant that each song needed to establish some sort of musical characterization independent of the others and develop a quick rapport with the audience. Such a rapid familiarity and identification of purpose can be achieved through pastiche. But it was only a musical starting point, for the songs in Cats move beyond the straightforward "Elvis" pastiche of Joseph and the Amazing Technicolor Dreamcoat; they are less pointed, more the free workings within a range of chosen styles than direct copies of a specific performer or number. The audience responds to the musical differences, given an initial security provided by the familiarity of recognizable, underlying stylistic generalities.

Lloyd Webber also employs various techniques to help connect the pieces. Namely, the score relies heavily on recurring motifs as well as the use of preludes and reprises. For instance, melodic fragments of "Memory" are sung by Grizabella and Jemima at several points in the show before the song is sung in full, serving to characterise Grizabella and foreshadow her final number. Similarly, Lloyd Webber introduces a fugue in the overture, and variations of this theme are then repeated throughout the musical until it is finally resolved as Grizabella ascends to the Heaviside Layer.

The musical also features an unusual amount of "group-description" numbers. According to musicologist Jessica Sternfeld, such numbers are usually relegated to the prologue and nothing more, as seen in "Another Op'nin', Another Show" from Kiss Me, Kate and "Tradition" from Fiddler on the Roof. Cats on the other hand features four Jellicle-defining songs: "Jellicle Songs for Jellicle Cats", "The Naming of Cats", "The Jellicle Ball" and "The Ad-Dressing of Cats". These numbers allow the cats to celebrate their tribe and species as a whole, in between the ones that celebrate individual members.

=== Choreography ===
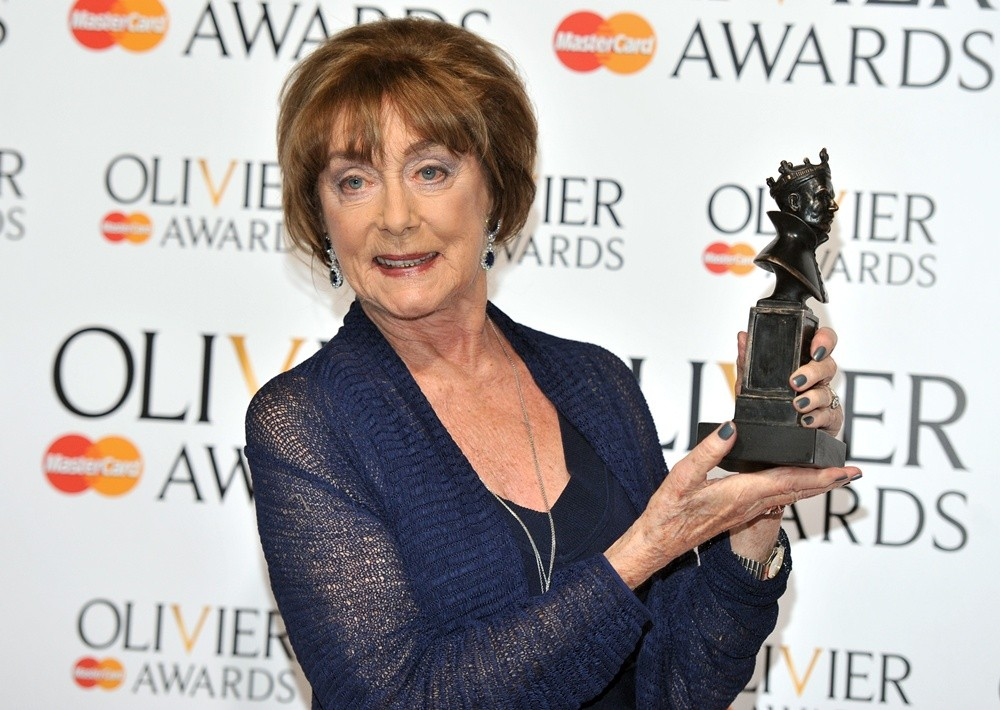
Gillian Lynne

Regarded as "one of the most challenging shows to dance in musical theatre history", dance plays a major role in Cats as the original creative team had specifically set out to create "England's first dance musical". Before Cats, the industry-wide belief was that British dancers were inferior to their Broadway counterparts. The risky hiring of a British choreographer, Lynne, for a British dance musical was described by one historian as "a vivid and marvellous gesture of transatlantic defiance". Making Lynne's job more challenging was the fact that the music in Cats is unceasing and the majority of the cast remains on-stage throughout nearly the entire show.

Lynne choreographed the original London production with a dance crew consisting of her assistant Lindsay Dolan, the dance captain Jo-Anne Robinson, and cast members Finola Hughes and John Thornton. The resulting choreography blends ballet, modern dance, jazz and tap, interspersed with acrobatic displays. Lynne also trained the cast to evoke the movement, physicality and behaviour of actual cats. These feline traits were incorporated into the movement and choreography so as to create an "anthropomorphic illusion". Lynne considered the 13-minute "Jellicle Ball" dance to be the crux of the show, noting that in order to work as a dance-driven musical, Cats "had to succeed there or die". She recalled the difficulty she faced in persuading Lloyd Webber to add the extended dance break, culminating in her and her dance crew having to dance all the parts in the "Jellicle Ball" to convince him.

=== Staging ===
The original staging of Cats at the New London Theatre was considered revolutionary and "one of the first truly immersive theatrical experiences". Instead of a conventional proscenium, the theatre was quasi-in-the-round with a central revolving stage. Nunn and Napier had sought to create "an environment rather than a set", and around $900,000 was spent remodelling the New London in preparation for the show. This included mounting sections of the stalls onto the theatre's 60 ft (18 m) revolve such that the audience moved along with the stage. When the show was brought to Broadway, the Winter Garden Theatre was given a similar $2 million makeover; its proscenium stage was converted into a thrust, and a part of its roof was torn through to allow for the effects of Grizabella's ascension to the Heaviside Layer.

Nunn was also adamant that the orchestra for Cats be hidden backstage — out of the audience's view — so as not to break the immersion. Adding to the experience, the show usually includes a lot of audience interaction, such as during the overture when the cast don flashing "green eyes" as they make their way through the audience in the darkened theatre. In the original Broadway production, catwalks were built to connect the stage to the boxes and balcony so as to give the cast access to the entire auditorium during the show.

=== Set and costume design ===
Napier began designing the set in November 1980, wanting "a place where cats might congregate together, which also included maximum room for dancing". The set of Cats consists of a junkyard filled with oversized props to give the illusion that the cast are the size of actual cats; it remains the same throughout the show without any scene changes. Over 2,500 of these scaled-up props were used to fill the whole auditorium in the original Broadway production.

Napier also designed the costumes, combining cat and human features based on "hints" given in Eliot's poems, while ensuring that they did not impede the dancers' movements. The costumes generally consist of a unitard, a wig that is fashioned to suggest the presence of feline ears, patches resembling body fur, and arm and leg warmers to give the performers' hands and feet a more paw-like appearance. As with the contrasting music and dance styles, the costumes and make-up are used to bring out each character's distinct personality. For example, the costume for the flirtatious Bombalurina is designed to accentuate her sensuality, while the markings on the costume for Jemima — the youngest of the tribe — resemble crayon scribbles. Every character's design motif is custom-painted by hand onto a plain unitard to line up with their performer's individual body. To reproduce the "hand-drawn aesthetic" of Napier's original design sketches, costume painters in the original Broadway production used squeeze bottles to apply the paint. Due to the amount of dancing in Cats, most of the costumes did not last longer than a few months.

== Productions ==
Cats has been translated into over 15 languages and produced professionally in more than 30 countries.

=== West End ===
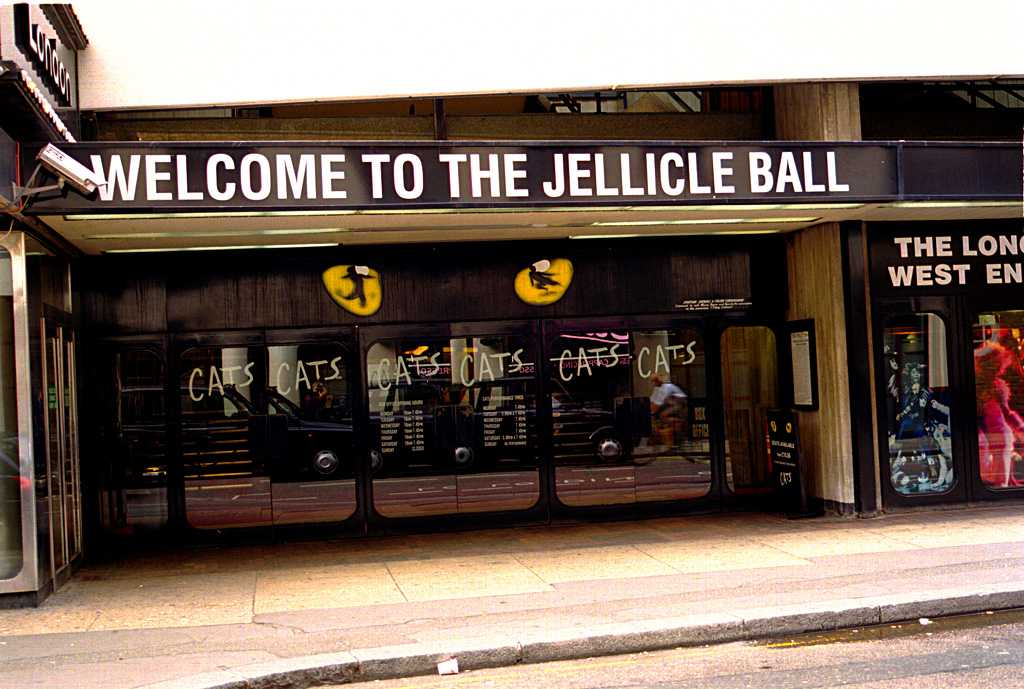
Cats at the New London Theatre (1999)

Cats premiered in the West End at the New London Theatre on 11 May 1981. The musical was produced by Mackintosh and Lloyd Webber's Really Useful Group, with direction by Nunn, choreography by Lynne (who also served as the associate director), set and costume design by Napier, lighting design by David Hersey, sound design by Abe Jacob and music direction by Harry Rabinowitz. It played a total of 8,949 performances before closing on its 21st anniversary, 11 May 2002. The final performance was broadcast live on a large outdoor screen in Covent Garden for fans who could not acquire a ticket. Cats held the record as London's longest-running musical from 1989, when it surpassed Jesus Christ Superstar, until 8 October 2006, when it was surpassed by Les Misérables.

The musical returned to the West End in 2014 for a planned 12-week limited run at the London Palladium. Beginning on 6 December, the revival starred Nicole Scherzinger as Grizabella, and featured the original creative team, with direction from Nunn, choreography by Lynne and design by Napier. Lloyd Webber was also involved and rewrote "The Rum Tum Tugger" for the revival. The run was later extended through April 2015 and an additional 100,000 tickets were released, with Kerry Ellis replacing Scherzinger as Grizabella. The musical returned once again to the London Palladium for another limited run lasting from 23 October 2015 to 2 January 2016, starring Beverley Knight as Grizabella.

In summer 2026, Regent's Park Open Air Theatre will present a new revival from 25 July to 12 September 2026, directed and choreographed by its Artistic Director, Drew McOnie. Following the run, the production will tour the UK and Ireland from October 2026 until 2027..

=== Original Broadway production and 2016 Broadway revival ===
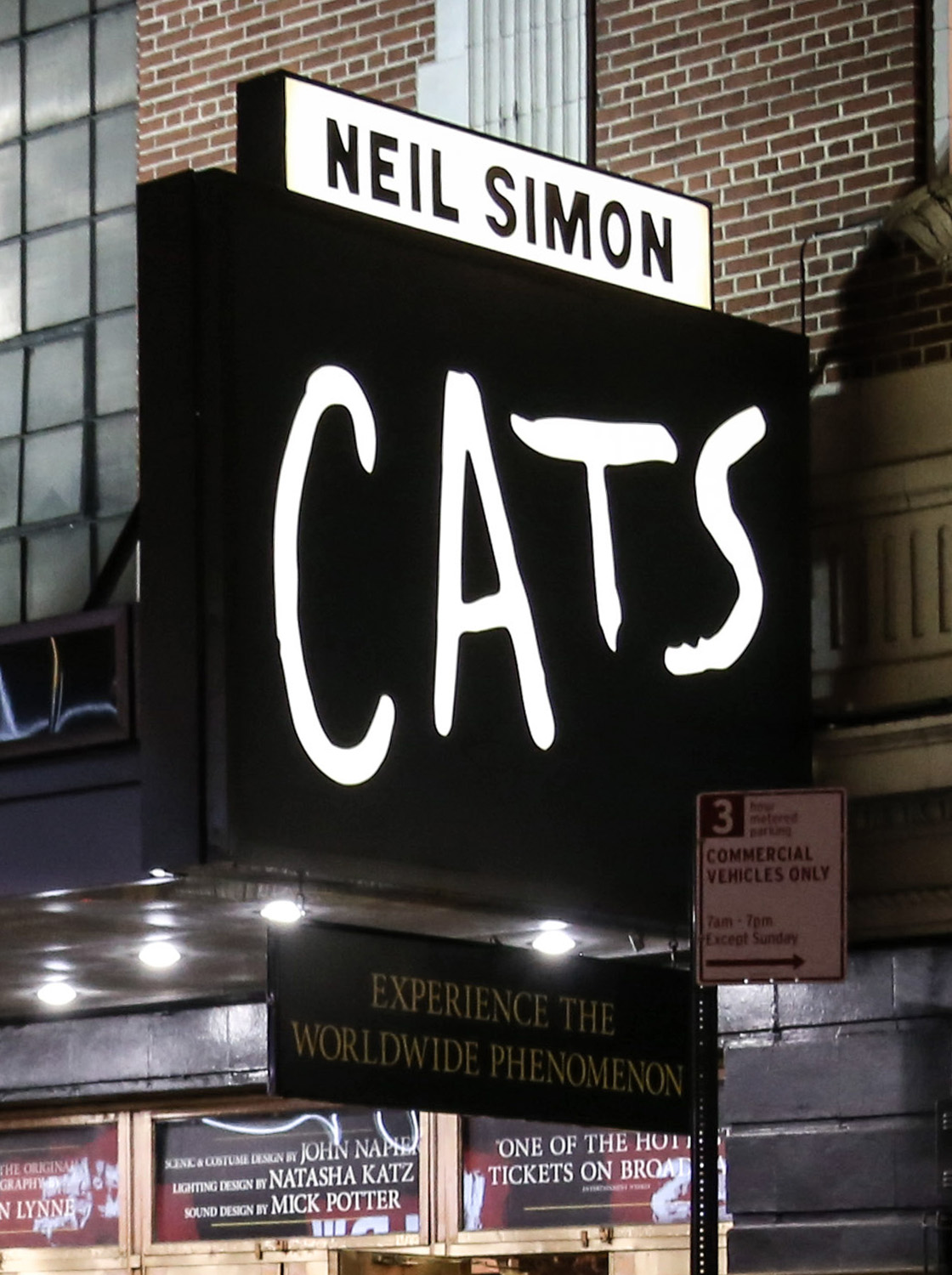
Broadway revival of Cats at the Neil Simon Theatre

Cats debuted on Broadway on 7 October 1982 at the Winter Garden Theatre with a record-breaking $6.2 million in ticket pre-sales. The musical was co-produced by the original London production team, along with David Geffen and The Shubert Organization. Most of the original creative team remained, with Martin Levan replacing Jacob as the sound designer and Stanley Lebowsky replacing Rabinowitz as music director. It was the most expensive Broadway show ever mounted at the time with a production cost of $5.5 million, though it recouped its investment in less than 10 months. On 19 June 1997, Cats overtook A Chorus Line to become the longest-running show in Broadway history with 6,138 performances. At the time, the musical was found to have had an economic impact of $3.12 billion on New York City and had generated the most theatrical jobs of any single entity in Broadway history. In early 2000, the show's closing was scheduled for June but it was subsequently pushed back after a resulting surge in ticket sales. The show closed on 10 September 2000 after a total of 15 previews and 7,485 performances. One actress, Marlene Danielle, performed in the Broadway production for its entire 18-year run. Its Broadway-run record was surpassed on 9 January 2006 by The Phantom of the Opera, and Cats remains Broadway's fifth-longest-running show of all time. Overall, the original Broadway production grossed approximately $388 million in ticket sales.

Encouraged by the reception to the first West End revival, producers began looking to bring Cats back to Broadway in early 2015. The Broadway revival opened on 31 July 2016 at the Neil Simon Theatre. It featured new choreography by Andy Blankenbuehler, with Nunn and Napier from the original creative team returning to direct and design respectively. Scherzinger, who played Grizabella in the 2014 West End revival, had originally agreed to reprise the role on Broadway but later withdrew. Leona Lewis was cast as Grizabella instead, and was succeeded by Mamie Parris three months later in October 2016. The Broadway revival closed on 30 December 2017 after 16 previews and 593 performances.

=== Cats: The Jellicle Ball ===
A reinvention of the show, billed as Cats: The Jellicle Ball, made its Off-Broadway debut at the Perelman Performing Arts Center in June 2024 and was twice extended, closing in September. Directed by Zhailon Levingston and Bill Rauch and choreographed by Arturo Lyons and Omari Wiles, the show was a radical reimagining of the musical taking inspiration from ballroom culture. Josephine Kearns served as dramaturg and gender consultant. André De Shields starred as Old Deuteronomy, with other cast members including Jonathan Burke as Mungojerrie, Sydney James Harcourt as Rum Tum Tugger, Antwayn Hopper as Macavity, Junior LaBeija (the emcee featured in the Ballroom documentary Paris Is Burning) as Gus, "Tempress" Chasity Moore as Grizabella, and Nora Schell as Bustopher Jones. This was the show's first major production to depart stylistically from the original.

Andrew Lloyd Webber confirmed that Cats: The Jellicle Ball would transfer to Broadway in spring 2026, and would be the first production for LW Entertainment following the company's rebranding in summer 2025. The production subsequently opened at the Broadhurst Theatre on 7 April 2026, with much of the Off-Broadway cast reprising their roles. Cats: The Jellicle Ball was nominated in nine categories at the 79th Tony Awards, including Best Revival of a Musical, ultimately winning three: Best Direction of a Musical, Best Costume Design of a Musical for Qween Jean, and Best Choreography. Robert "Silk" Mason also won the 2026 Chita Rivera Award for Outstanding Dancer in a Broadway Show for their performance as Mr. Mistoffelees.

On 8 August 2026, this production bid farewell at the Broadhurst Theatre, after 21 previews and 141 regular performances. A cast album will be released on 30 October 2026 through Atlantic Records.

=== North America ===
Following its Broadway debut, Cats has been staged extensively across North America. The first US national tour, Cats National I, launched at the Shubert Theatre in Boston in December 1983 and closed in November 1987. The opening night cast included Laurie Beechman playing Grizabella and Charlotte d'Amboise playing Cassandra; later replacements included Victoria Clark and Jessica Molaskey both playing Jellylorum/Griddlebone. This production was a "slow tour" that had lengthy engagements lasting for several months in each of the nine cities it visited. Cats National II, a separate sit-down production at the Los Angeles Shubert Theatre, ran from January 1985 to November 1986, and starred Kim Criswell and George de la Peña in the roles of Grizabella and Mistoffelees respectively. A third US touring company, Cats National III, ran for two years from September 1986 to September 1988. Notable performers in the third tour included Jonathan Cerullo as Skimbleshanks (1986) and Bill Nolte as Old Deuteronomy (1987).

The fourth national company, Cats National IV, toured the United States for 13 years from March 1987 to December 1999. It overtook the first national tour of Oklahoma! in November 1997 to become the longest-running tour in theatre history, and played its 5,000th performance in July 1999. Notable performers in the fourth tour included Amelia Marshall as Sillabub (1988), Jan Horvath as Grizabella (1990), Bryan Batt as Munkustrap (1991–1992), Jennifer Cody as Rumpleteazer (1992), David Hibbard as Rum Tum Tugger (1992–1993), Natalie Toro as Grizabella (1992, 1997), Christopher Gattelli as Mistoffelees (1993), John Treacy Egan as Old Deuteronomy (1993–1994), J. Robert Spencer as Rum Tum Tugger (1995), Bart Shatto as Bustopher Jones/Gus/Growltiger (1996), Linda Balgord as Grizabella (1998), Andy Karl as Rum Tum Tugger (1998), and Lena Hall as Demeter (1998). By June 1997, the North American touring companies had grossed over $400 million.

After the show's closure on Broadway in 2000, Troika Entertainment obtained the touring rights for Cats and launched the show's first non-Equity national company. After a try-out at Harrah's Atlantic City in July 2001, the production toured North America for 11 years from August 2001 to June 2012. Performers in the non-Equity tour included Julie Garnyé as Jennyanydots (2001), Dee Roscioli as Grizabella (2002), and Jonathan Burke as Mungojerrie (2004). In January 2019, a new North American Equity tour based on the 2016 Broadway revival opened at the Providence Performing Arts Center in Rhode Island, and was originally scheduled to run through June 2020. However, due to the COVID-19 pandemic, performances of this tour were suspended on 13 March 2020. The tour re-launched as a non-Equity production on 21 September 2021.

Meanwhile, the first Canadian national production premiered in March 1985 at the Elgin and Winter Garden Theatres in Toronto, Ontario. It moved to Montreal two years later and then toured other parts of Canada. By the time the production closed in August 1989, it had become the most successful Canadian stage production of all time with a box office of $78 million from nearly 2 million tickets. A second All-Canadian company began at Toronto's former Panasonic Theatre in May 2013 and ran for four months & 128 performances, 28 years after the original production.

The musical first played in Mexico from April 1991 to November 1992; the Spanish-language production performed over 400 shows and starred María del Sol as Grizabella, Manuel Landeta as Munkustrap, Susana Zabaleta as Jellylorum, Maru Dueñas as Sillabub and Ariel López Padilla as Macavity. A revival premiered at the Teatro San Rafael in May 2013, with an opening night cast that included Filippa Giordano as Grizabella, Landeta, and Maru Dueñas. After a total of 350 performances, the show closed at the Teatro San Rafael in June 2014, and then toured over 36 cities in Mexico until December 2014. Other performers who later joined the production included Lisset, Rocío Banquells, Lila Deneken and Myriam Montemayor Cruz, all of whom played Grizabella. Another Mexican revival was launched at the Coyoacán Centennial Theater in October 2018, with Yuri as Grizabella and Landeta as Old Deuteronomy. The revival marked its 200th performance in May 2019.

=== United Kingdom ===
The first UK and Ireland tour opened in May 1989 at the Opera House Theatre in Blackpool. The cast for this tour included Marti Webb as Grizabella, Rosemarie Ford as Bombalurina and John Partridge as Alonzo. Following a six-month engagement in Blackpool that broke the theatre's box office record and was seen by around 450,000 people, the production moved to the Edinburgh Playhouse for three months, before closing in May 1990 after another two months at the Point Theatre in Dublin. A second national tour launched in June 1993 at the Bristol Hippodrome, featuring Rosemarie Ford as Grizabella, Robin Cousins as Munkustrap, Simon Rice as Mistoffelees and Tony Monopoly as Old Deuteronomy. The tour closed at the Manchester Opera House in December 1995.

Following the closure of the original West End production, a nationwide tour embarked in 2003 with Chrissie Hammond starring as Grizabella, until Dianne Pilkington took over the role in 2006. Hammond reprised the role on tour again from 2007 to 2008.

A UK and Ireland tour of Cats launched in February 2013 at the Edinburgh Playhouse with Joanna Ampil as Grizabella. Susan McFadden took over the role from Ampil during the tour's three-week stop in Dublin. The production ran through 2014 before transferring to the West End. In between its limited West End runs, the musical returned to the Blackpool Opera House Theatre in 2015, this time starring Jane McDonald as Grizabella. After the second West End revival, the production toured the UK in 2016 with Anita Louise Combe as Grizabella and Marcquelle Ward as Rum Tum Tugger.

=== Japan ===
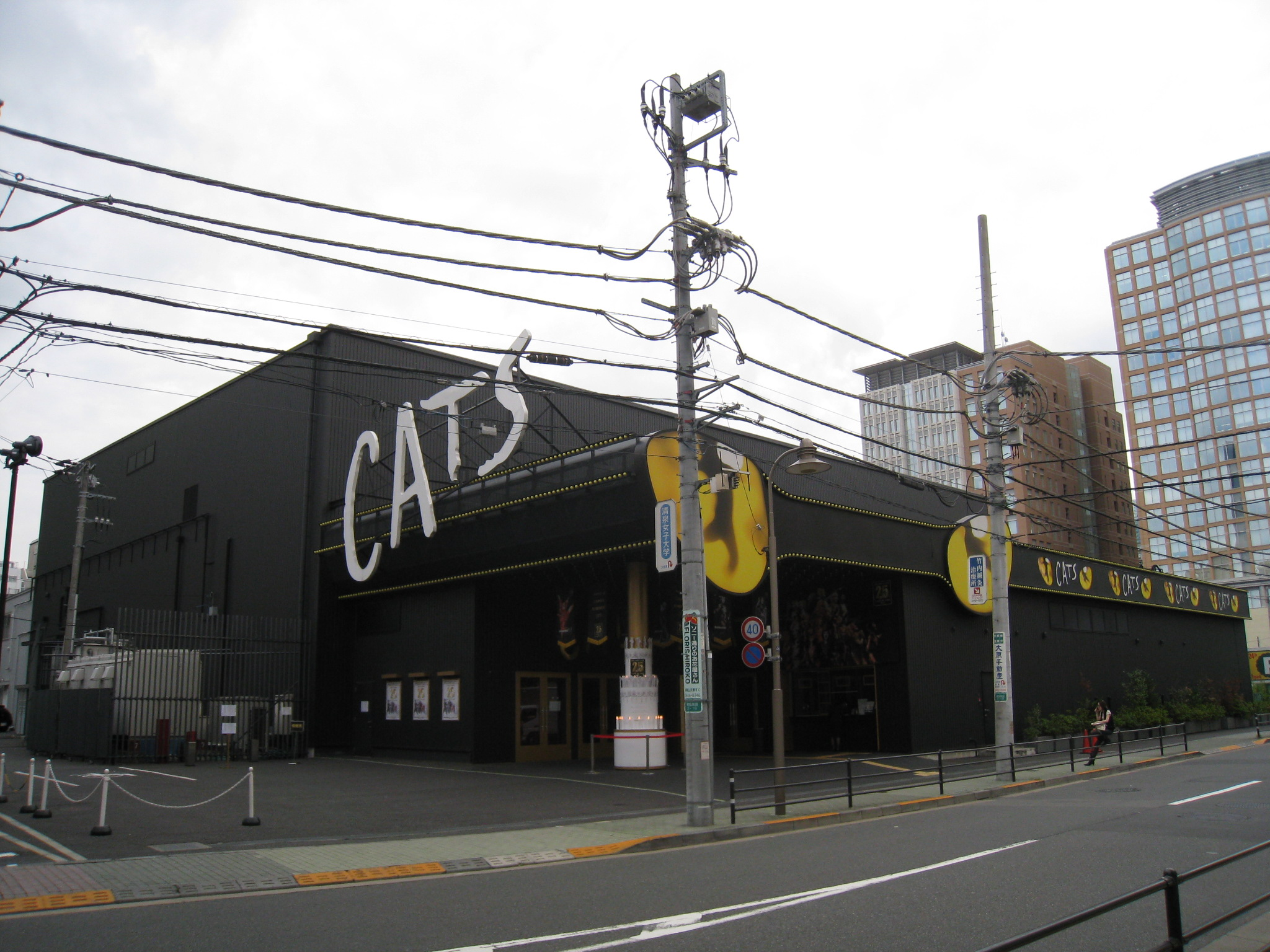
The CATS Theatre in Shinagawa, Tokyo (2008)

The Japanese-language production of Cats by the Shiki Theatre Company has been playing continuously since it premiered in Shinjuku, Tokyo, in November 1983. This production is a "slow tour" with engagements lasting for several years in each of the nine cities it has visited. An initial investment of ¥800 million (US$3.4 million in 1983) was required to bring Cats to Japan, including ¥300 million for the construction of a purpose-built theatre tailored to the needs of the musical. This was a big financial risk for the Shiki Theatre Company as it meant that a long run was needed to turn a profit; however, stage productions in Japan ran on a monthly basis at the time and open-ended runs were unheard of. The resulting success of this production led to what the local media termed a "musical boom" in the 1980s, with other Broadway musicals quickly following suit and opening in Japan.

As of 2019, the show is performed at the purpose-built CATS Theatre in Tokyo. The production has played over 10,000 performances to over 10 million audience members.

Similar to the original London staging, the set of the 1,200-capacity CATS Theatre is built on a revolving stage floor such that during the overture, the stage and sections of the stalls revolve approximately 180 degrees into place. In 1998, the Japanese production underwent major revisions to the choreography, staging and costume designs. Following further revisions in 2018, the current incarnation features 27 named cats, including both Jemima and Sillabub (who have evolved into two separate characters), and an original character named Gilbert.

There have been numerous notable performers in the Japanese production, including Shintarō Sonooka as Munkustrap (original 1983 cast), Kanji Ishimaru as Skimbleshanks (1992), Masachika Ichimura, and Mayo Kawasaki. Yoshiko Hattori (ja:服部良子) holds the production's record for the longest-appearing cast member; she played Jennyanydots in the original 1983 cast and remained in the role for 20 years with a final performance tally of 4,251.

=== Vienna ===
Under the direction of Peter Weck, the first German-language production of Cats in Michael Kunze's translation opened in September 1983 at the Theater an der Wien in Vienna, Austria. In 1988, the show transferred to the newly renovated Ronacher Theatre where it ran for another two years before closing on its seventh anniversary in September 1990. The Vienna production played a total of 2,040 performances to more than 2.3 million audience members.

The original Viennese cast included Ute Lemper who played Bombalurina, Steve Barton who played Munkustrap, Robert Montano who played Pouncival, and Angelika Milster who played Grizabella. Pia Douwes was also a member of the cast from 1987 to 1989, covering several different characters including Grizabella. The Vienna production also performed limited runs at the Komische Oper Berlin in East Germany in 1987, and at the Moscow Operetta Theatre in the Soviet Union in 1988.

A revival by the Vereinigte Bühnen Wien production company opened at the Ronacher Theatre in September 2019 and closed in June 2022. The revival cast included Rory Six who played Old Deuteronomy, Alexander Auler who played Munkustrap, Felix Martin Poenichen who played Gus/Growltiger and Bustopher Jones, and Ana Milva Gomes who played Grizabella.

=== Germany ===
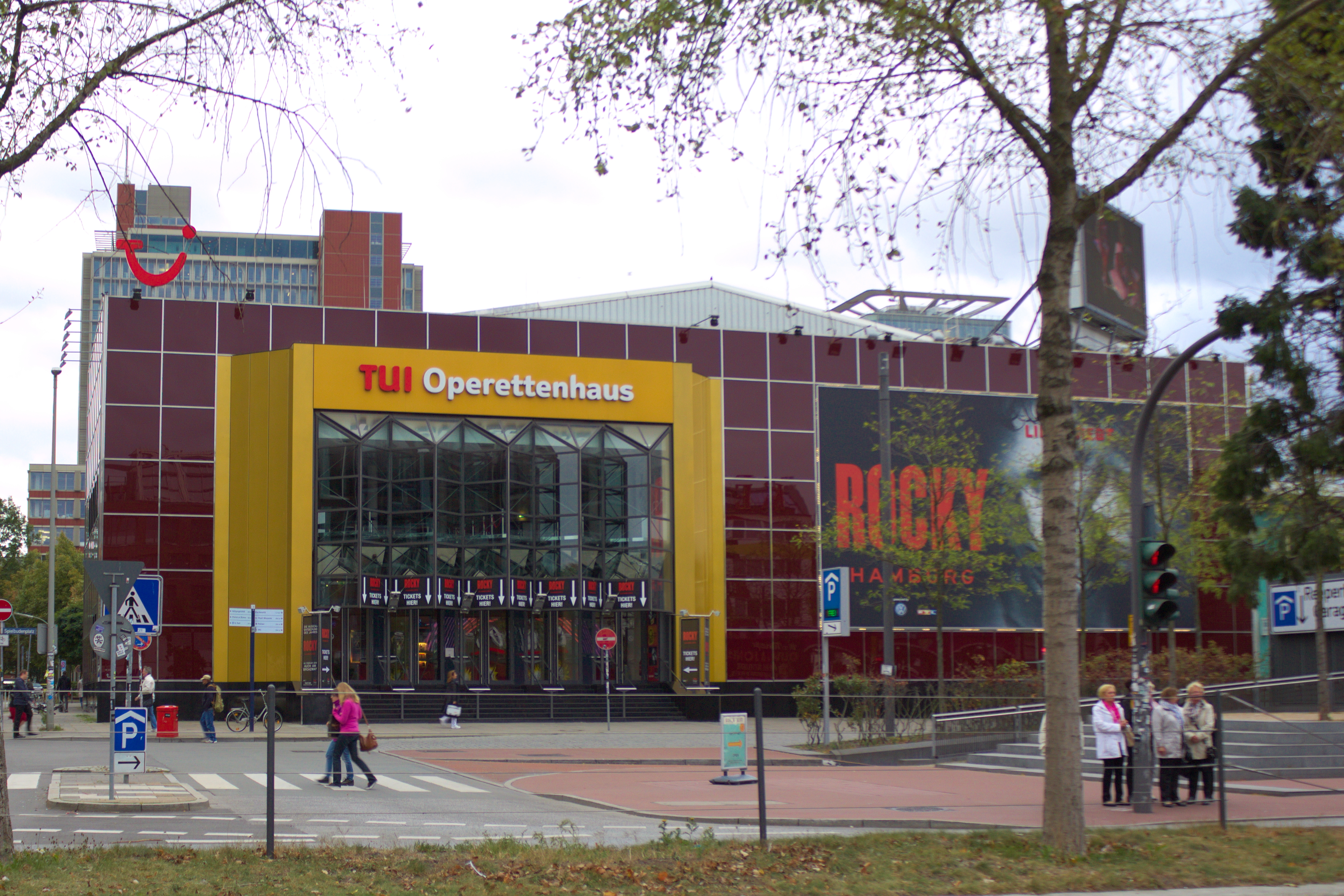
The Operettenhaus where Cats played for 15 years

Influenced by the show's success in Vienna, a German production by Stella Entertainment premiered in April 1986 at the newly renovated Operettenhaus in Hamburg using a new translation by Sabine Grohmann, John Baer, and Marc Henning. It closed in January 2001 after 15 years, having played over 6,100 performances to 6.2 million audiences. Cats was the first stage production in the country to be mounted without public funding and was also the first to run for multiple years; its success established the medium as a profitable venture in Germany. The musical was also a huge boost for tourism in Hamburg, particularly the subdivision of St. Pauli where it accounted for 30% of all tourists. The number of overnight visitors to the city increased by over one million per year within the first five years of the show's premiere.

Cats redefined musical theatre in the German-speaking part of the world, turning an industry which consisted of repertory theatre at the time towards privately funded commercial productions. The success of the Vienna and Hamburg productions sparked a "musical boom" in the region that saw numerous musicals being launched not just in Germany but also in Switzerland. It also led to a "construction boom" in Germany as new theatrical venues such as the Schmidt Theater were enacted all around the country. Germany has since grown to become the third largest musical market after the US and UK, with Hamburg as its "musical capital".

After Hamburg, the German production transferred to Stuttgart where it played from 2001 to 2002. Stage Entertainment took over the production mid-2002 and moved the show to Berlin (2002–2004) and later Düsseldorf (2004–2005), before touring other cities until 2006. Mehr-Entertainment launched a separate tour of Cats that ran from December 2010 to June 2013, performing in a travelling purpose-built tent theatre. Besides Germany, this company also made stops in cities in Luxembourg, Switzerland and Austria.

=== Europe ===
Beyond the UK, Vienna, and Germany, Cats is also produced frequently in the rest of Europe.

==== 1980s and 1990s ====
The first non-English production of Cats premiered in March 1983 at the Madách Theatre in Budapest, Hungary, with direction by Tamás Szirtes and choreography by László Seregi. Since then, the Hungarian-language production has continued to be staged intermittently as part of the Madách Theatre's repertoire and, as of 2017, has been performed nearly 1,500 times.

November 1985 saw the premiere of a Norwegian-language production at Det Norske Teatret in Oslo. It closed in January 1987 and included performers such as Øivind Blunck, Brit Elisabeth Haagensli and Øystein Wiik. Jorma Uotinen directed and choreographed a Finnish production at the Helsinki City Theatre that ran for over two years from September 1986 to December 1988, and featured Monica Aspelund as Grizabella, Heikki Kinnunen as Gus, and Kristiina Elstelä as Jennyanydots/Griddlebone. A Swedish version of the musical opened in 1987 at the Chinateatern in Stockholm. The production was seen by 326,000 audiences before it transferred to the Scandinavium in Gothenburg two years later.

Meanwhile, the Carré Theatre in Amsterdam, Netherlands, staged the musical in 1987 (with Ruth Jacott as Grizabella), 1988 and from 1992 to 1993. Cats made its French debut at the Théâtre de Paris from February 1989 to April 1990, with an original cast that included Gilles Ramade as Old Deuteronomy. The show was also produced in Zürich at the ABB Musical Theatre from 1991 to 1993, while a production by Joop van den Ende and the Royal Ballet of Flanders was staged at the Stadsschouwburg Antwerpen in Belgium in 1996. An English/German-language "Eurotour" production also toured the region from May 1994 to December 1995.

==== 21st century ====
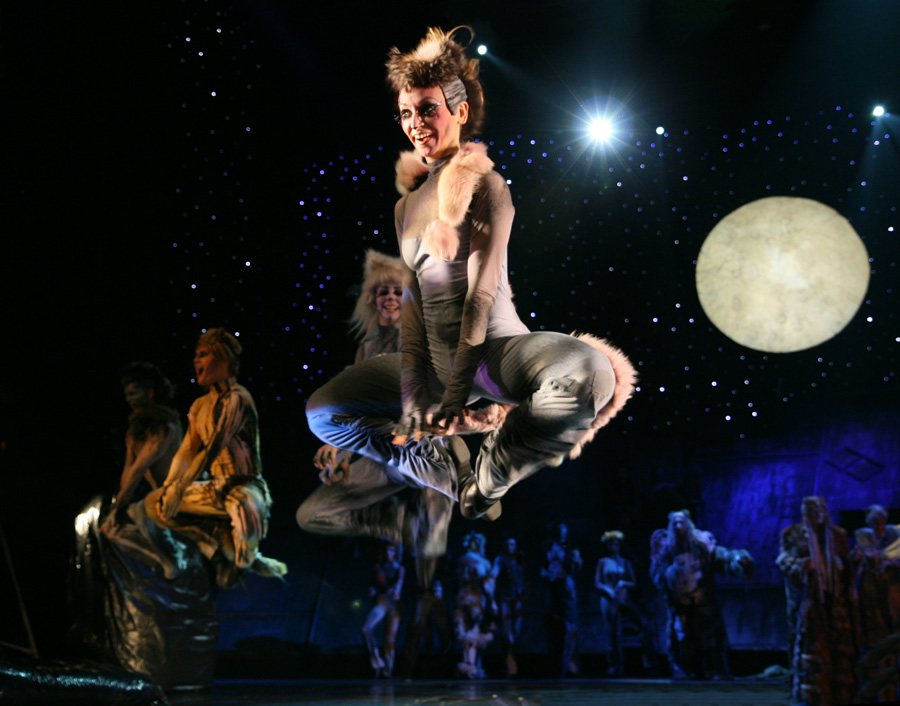
The first non-replica production of Cats was staged at the Teatr Muzyczny Roma in Warsaw, Poland (2007).

The show was staged at the Det Ny Teater in Copenhagen, Denmark, in the 2002–2003 season. This Danish production was translated by Adam Price and was one of the largest theatrical productions ever mounted in the country at the time with 100 performers, musicians and stagehands. The first non-replica production of Cats was approved for a Polish production at the Teatr Muzyczny Roma in Warsaw. Set in an abandoned film studio instead of a junkyard, the Polish version opened in January 2004 and closed in 2010. The Gothenburg opera house staged a production with a Swedish-language script by Ingela Forsman; this version was reimagined to take place in an abandoned fairground and played from September 2006 to February 2007. Other productions were also staged at the Divadlo Milenium in Prague from 2004 to 2005, and a Norwegian revival at the Chat Noir in Oslo in 2009. The first Italian-language production began touring Italy in 2009.

The Dutch live entertainment company Stage Entertainment has been responsible for several European productions of Cats. The company produced the musical at the Coliseum Theatre in Madrid from December 2003 to January 2005, with a cast that included Víctor Ullate Roche as Mistoffelees. They then staged a Russian-language production at the Moscow Palace of Youth from 2005 to 2006, with a cast that included Ivan Ozhogin as Munkustrap. A Dutch production under the same company toured the Netherlands and Belgium from 2006 to 2007, featuring several performers in the role of Grizabella including Pia Douwes and Anita Meyer. A Paris revival by Stage Entertainment ran at the Théâtre Mogador from October 2015 to July 2016. This production was based on the 2014 London revival and also featured a new song written especially for the French show by Lloyd Webber.

English-language touring companies have also toured the European region extensively. International tours in the early to late 2000s included stops in Sweden, Norway, Finland, Greece, Portugal, Germany, and Italy. The 2013–2014 UK tour visited cities in Belgium, Greece, Italy, Monaco, and Portugal. Most recently, a UK production played in numerous European cities from 2016 to 2019, with tour stops in Switzerland, Croatia, Belgium, Poland, Bulgaria, Germany, Norway, Sweden, Finland, Denmark, Netherlands, and Luxembourg. These European tours have featured several notable performers in the role of Grizabella, including Pernilla Wahlgren (Sweden; 2003), Katarína Hasprová (Slovakia; 2016) and Jenna Lee-James (Netherlands; 2018–2019).

=== Oceania ===
The first Australian production ran from July 1985 to August 1987 at the Theatre Royal in Sydney. The original cast included Debra Byrne as Grizabella, John Wood as Old Deuteronomy, Marina Prior as Jellylorum, Jeff Phillips as Rum Tum Tugger, David Atkins as Mistoffelees, and Anita Louise Combe as Sillabub. The Sydney production cost $3 million to mount and grossed a record $28 million. It was credited with revitalising the then-stagnant musical genre in Australia. After closing in Sydney, an additional $1.8 million was spent transferring the production to Melbourne, including $725,000 to refurbish the old Her Majesty's Theatre. The Melbourne run played from October 1987 to December 1988, with an opening night cast that included Megan Williams as Grizabella, Wood as Old Deuteronomy, Phillips as Rum Tum Tugger, Linda Hartley-Clark as Demeter, Femi Taylor as Bombalurina, Rachael Beck as Rumpleteazer and Seán Martin Hingston as Plato/Macavity. From 1989 to 1990, the company toured the Festival Theatre in Adelaide, His Majesty's Theatre in Perth, Civic Theatre in Newcastle, Lyric Theatre in Brisbane, and the St. James Theatre in Auckland. This was followed by a second national tour from 1993 to 1996, during which Delia Hannah made her debut as Grizabella in 1994. A professional circus adaptation of Cats, titled Cats Run Away to the Circus, had a national tent tour from 1999 to 2001, with Hannah once again starring as Grizabella. Hannah reprised her role for another production that toured Australia and Asia in 2009 and 2010.

In July 2014, Australia's Harvest Rain Theatre Company staged the biggest production of Cats in the Southern Hemisphere with over 700 performers. Produced by Tim O'Connor, the production was performed at the Brisbane Convention & Exhibition Centre. Callum Mansfield directed and choreographed it, and its cast included Marina Prior as Grizabella and Steven Tandy as Bustopher Jones and Gus. From October 2015 to May 2016, a revival toured Australia with stops in Sydney, Hobart, Melbourne, Brisbane, Adelaide, and Perth. The revival featured singer-songwriter Delta Goodrem as Grizabella, before Delia Hannah took over the role during the Adelaide and Perth seasons.

The show returned to Auckland in 1995 as part of a three-city New Zealand tour, and again in 2015 preceding the 2015/16 Australian tour. A New Zealand national tour played across 16 cities in 2019, with a reimagined setting in a derelict Victorian theatre that was inspired by post-earthquake Christchurch. A 2025 Australia production will return in June 2025.

=== Asia ===
Besides Japan, Cats is also produced regularly in other parts of Asia. The region has hosted numerous English-language productions of the musical, beginning with a tour from 1993 to 1994 when it played in Singapore (with local actress Jacintha Abisheganaden as Grizabella), Hong Kong and South Korea. Cats returned to Asia from 2002 to 2004, when an international touring company performed in Malaysia, South Korea, Shanghai, Taipei and Beijing; the 2004 cast included Slindile Nodangala in the role of Grizabella. A touring company visited Asia again between 2007 and 2010, including stops in the region of Taiwan, Macau, and Thailand in 2007; South Korea from 2007 to 2008; China in 2008; Singapore and Hong Kong in 2009 (with Delia Hannah playing Grizabella); and Manila in 2010 (with Lea Salonga as Grizabella). Cats toured Asia again from 2014 to 2015, making stops in South Korea, Singapore and Macau. Two years later, another Asian tour was launched and is scheduled to run through 2020, with visits to South Korea from 2017 to 2018, Hong Kong and Taiwan in 2018, China in 2018 (with Joanna Ampil as Grizabella) and 2019, and planned stops in the Philippines and Singapore in 2019, and Malaysia in 2020. Cats was China's highest-grossing musical in 2018, accounting for over 20% of the total grosses from all musicals staged in the country that year.

The musical has also been translated and staged nationally in Asia. From September 2008 to May 2009, a Korean-language production toured South Korea, with Shin Youngsook and Ock Joo-hyun alternating as Grizabella, Kim Jin-woo and Daesung alternating as Rum Tum Tugger, and Kim Bo-kyung as Rumpleteazer. This production was revived and toured South Korea from 2011 to 2012, with Insooni and Park Hae-mi taking turns to portray Grizabella. The first Chinese-language production began touring various cities in China in 2012.

=== Others ===
Spanish and Portuguese-language productions of Cats have been staged in South America, with productions in Argentina in 1993 (with Mexican actress Olivia Bucio as Grizabella), in Chile in 2006 (at the Arena Santiago) and 2014, in Colombia in 2009, and in Brazil in 2010 (with Paula Lima as Grizabella). Other countries that the musical has been performed in include South Africa (2001–2002) & (2025-2026), Lebanon (2002), Qatar (2003, 2017), Turkey (2013), Israel (2014), and the United Arab Emirates (2017).

A full-length production of Cats has been performed regularly for guests aboard Royal Caribbean International's cruise ship Oasis of the Seas, starting in autumn 2014, with a cast rotating every nine months.

=== Regional and amateur ===
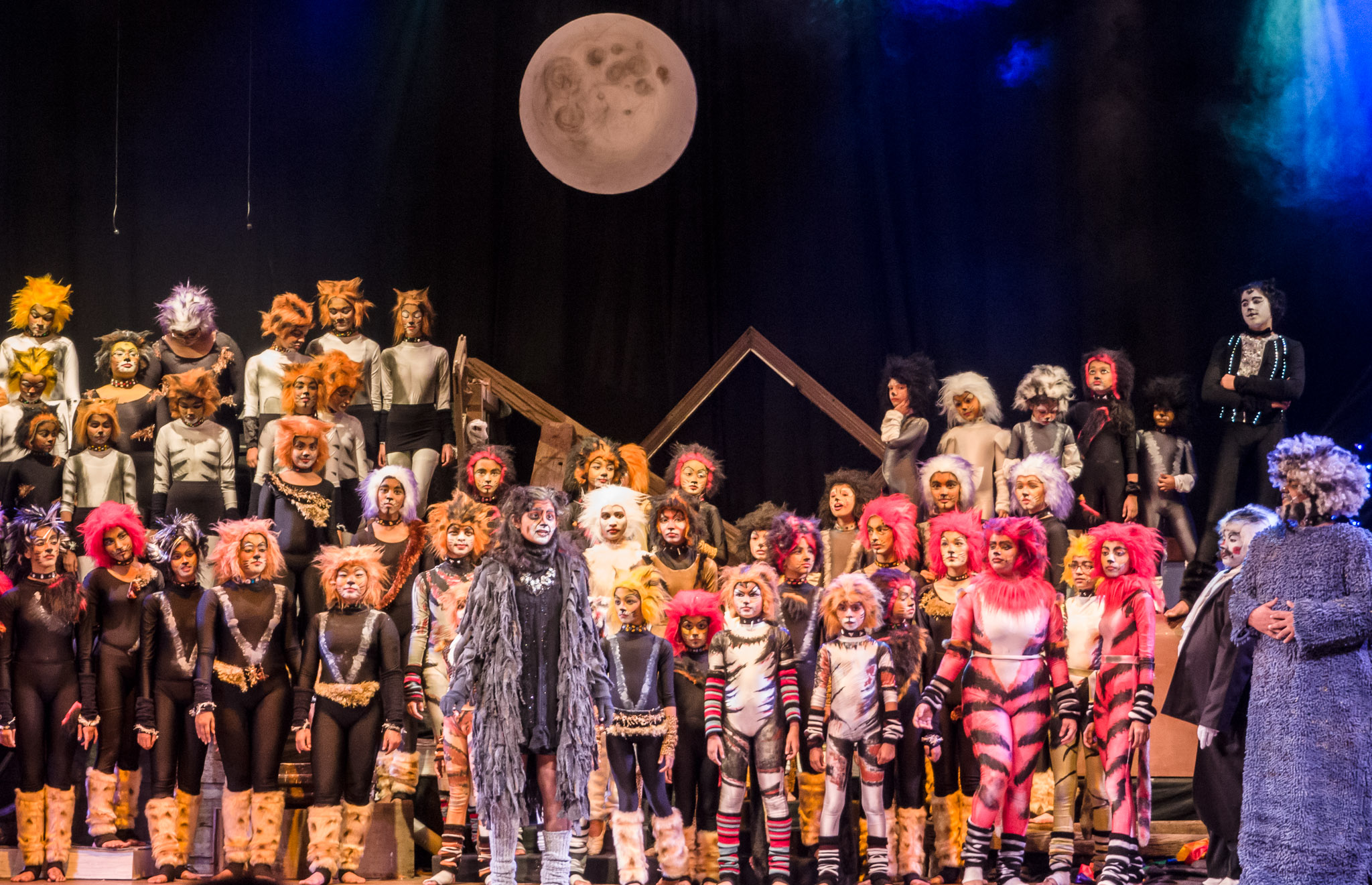
A school production of Cats in Bangalore, India (2014)

Cats has been produced by various professional regional theatre companies. Broadway Sacramento staged the musical in 2003 and 2009 at the Wells Fargo Pavilion. Both productions featured Ken Page reprising his role as Old Deuteronomy from the original Broadway production, along with Jacquelyn Piro Donovan as Grizabella and Jeffry Denman as Munkustrap. A 2010 amphitheatre production at The Muny starred Page as Old Deuteronomy, Stephanie J. Block as Grizabella and Lara Teeter as Munkustrap. The La Mirada Theatre for the Performing Arts staged the musical in 2014, with a cast that included Todrick Hall as Rum Tum Tugger.

Nick Winston directed and choreographed a production at the Kilworth House Theatre in 2019 with a cast that included Emma Hatton and Helen Anker. Set in a dilapidated London Underground station during World War II, this production was given a 5-star review by The Stage for its "radical" reimagining of Cats.

The musical is also available for school and amateur licensing through The Musical Company. On 24 March 2013, the largest-ever staging of Cats was performed by 3,000 students from Stagecoach Theatre Arts schools at the National Indoor Arena in Birmingham, UK.

== Film adaptations ==
Steven Spielberg's former animation studio Amblimation had planned an animated adaptation of the musical in the 1990s. The film was to be set in war-torn London during World War II, but the project was abandoned with the studio's closure in 1997. The following year, a direct-to-video film was released. The film was directed by David Mallet and was shot at the Adelphi Theatre in London. It starred Elaine Paige as Grizabella, John Mills as Gus, Ken Page as Old Deuteronomy, and Michael Gruber as Munkustrap.

A film adaptation directed by Tom Hooper for Universal Pictures, Amblin Entertainment and Working Title Films was released on 20 December 2019. The film starred James Corden as Bustopher Jones, Judi Dench as Old Deuteronomy, Jason Derulo as Rum Tum Tugger, Idris Elba as Macavity, Jennifer Hudson as Grizabella, Ian McKellen as Gus, Taylor Swift as Bombalurina, Rebel Wilson as Jennyanydots and Francesca Hayward as Victoria. Swift collaborated with Andrew Lloyd Webber for a new song called "Beautiful Ghosts." The movie was negatively received by both critics and audiences, and was also a box-office bomb. Andrew Lloyd Webber disowned the film, claiming that it convinced him to get a therapy dog.

== Reception ==
=== Box office ===
Cats was a commercial blockbuster. Its worldwide box office gross of over US$2 billion by 1994 made it the highest grossing musical in history at the time.

=== Critical reception ===
==== West End ====
The original London production received mostly rave reviews, with critics hailing it as a watershed moment in British musical theatre. Michael Billington of The Guardian lauded Cats as "an exhilarating piece of total theatre". Billington praised the show's "strong framework" and the ease in which the poems were integrated. He was also very impressed by Lloyd Webber's fitting compositions, Napier's environmental set, Lynne's effective and at times brilliant choreography, and Nunn's "dazzling staging" that makes use of the entire auditorium. The show received similarly glowing reviews from The Sunday Times' Derek Jewell and The Stage's Peter Hepple. Jewell proclaimed it to be "among the most exhilarating and innovative musicals ever staged", while Hepple declared that with Cats, "the British musical has taken a giant leap forward, surpassing in ingenuity and invention anything Broadway has sent us".

There were a few lukewarm reviews, most notably from Irving Wardle of The Times. Wardle enjoyed Lloyd Webber's compositions but found the visual spectacle too overwhelming. Robert Cushman's review for The Observer concluded that Cats was flawed but unmissable.

The reviews for the 2014 and 2015 London revivals were positive as well, with critics giving both productions an average of 4 out of 5 stars. Critics generally found the revivals to be enjoyable and invigorating, though Mark Shenton was disappointed that the new staging lacked the immersiveness of the original.

==== Broadway ====
Reactions to the original Broadway production were mixed. In his review for The New York Times, Frank Rich said the main draw of the show was that it "transports the audience into a complete fantasy world that could only exist in the theater". He attributed much of this "wondrous spectacle" to Nunn's direction, Napier's set and costume designs, as well as the cast. Rich found many of Lloyd Webber's songs to be "cleverly and appropriately" pastiche, but panned Lynne's choreography and felt that the musical failed in its vague attempt to tell a story. Overall, he wished the show had more "feeling to go with its most inventive stagecraft."

The New Yorker's Brendan Gill wrote: "Judged as a spectacle instead of simply as a musical, 'Cats' is a triumph." Conversely, Sylviane Gold of The Boston Phoenix called the musical "an overproduced trifle, a cabaret evening tricked out in Broadway regalia." Edwin Wilson of The Wall Street Journal described Cats as an "anomaly", writing that "[t]he world it creates is refreshingly novel [...] and Mr. Webber has composed a score of eminently hummable tunes," but noting there was a disconnect between the immense scale of the production and the simplicity of Eliot's lyrics. Clive Barnes of the New York Post concluded his review saying: "Its importance lies in its wholeheartedness. It is a statement of musical theater that cannot be ignored, should prove controversial and will never be forgotten."

The 2016 Broadway revival received a similarly mixed review by Charles Isherwood of The New York Times. Isherwood concluded that the revival was "fundamentally the Cats you knew and loved when you were first bit by the musical-theater bug. Or it's the Cats you knew and snickered at when you first encountered it."

=== Public perception ===
Despite its commercial success, Cats has developed a polarising public image and has frequently been treated as an object of parody. Reviewing the 2016 Broadway revival, Charles Isherwood of The New York Times wrote that it remained either the show audiences once “knew and loved” or the show they “knew and snickered at”. Retrospective coverage has attributed this response to the musical's unconventional mythology, limited narrative, anthropomorphic choreography and visual combination of feline makeup with skin-tight costumes. Aja Romano of Vox described the premise as inherently odd and wrote that modern audiences often receive the musical with bafflement and ironic amusement, despite its popularity and historical importance. The show's stylised feline movement has also been perceived as unusually sensual, an effect accentuated by costumes designed to permit continuous dancing.

=== Awards and nominations ===
Cats has received many international awards and nominations. The original London production was nominated for six Laurence Olivier Awards in 1981, winning two awards including Best New Musical. Two years later, the original Broadway production won seven Tony Awards, including Best Musical, out of eleven nominations. The London and Broadway cast recordings were nominated for the Grammy Award for Best Musical Theater Album, which the latter won. In 2015, the London revival was nominated for — but did not win — two Olivier Awards, including Best Musical Revival.

== Cultural impact and legacy ==
This is how they divide history: BC — Before Cats — and AD — Andrew Dominant.

— Mark Steyn on the history of musical theatre.

Despite mixed reviews when Cats opened in New York in 1982, critics agreed that it was innovative and visually spectacular in ways that Broadway had never seen before. The musical became a cultural phenomenon and has had a profound influence on the medium. Cats established musical theatre as a global commodity, marking the beginning of a new era in the industry that is characterised by huge global stakes for potentially even huger global profits. It led the shift in the Broadway market towards big-budget blockbusters and shows that appeal to families and tourists, which in turn left smaller productions struggling to compete. Cats also ushered in a "golden age of British musicals" which saw West End exports dominate the industry for nearly two decades. Musical theatre historian Vagelis Siropoulos asserted that in terms of impact, the "seminal Broadway opening" of Cats was "comparable only to Rodgers and Hammerstein's Oklahoma! thirty nine years ago."

Ultimately, critics are polarized on whether Cats has changed musical theatre for the better or for the worse. William Grimes wrote of its detractors: "There are more than a few who see the Cats phenomenon as the theatrical equivalent of the rise of the megabudget Hollywood action film. For them, Cats is a soulless money machine."

=== Influence and innovations ===
As the "first true megamusical", Cats pioneered a genre of musical theatre that is produced on a grand and global scale. It paved the way for later megamusicals — including Les Misérables (1985), The Phantom of the Opera (1986) and Miss Saigon (1989) — that have dominated the industry since. Siropoulos explained:

Cats is considered the quintessential megamusical, because it reconceived, like no other show before, theatrical space as an immense affective encompasser, that transforms the viewing experience into a hypercharged thrill-ride and the spectator into an explorer of new and challenging aural and visual sensations. Its unprecedented success paved the way for even bolder hyperspatial configurations, made the set designer a proper environment builder and raised light and sound design into the status of art in their own right. It also paved the way for the constant revolutionization of stage technology.

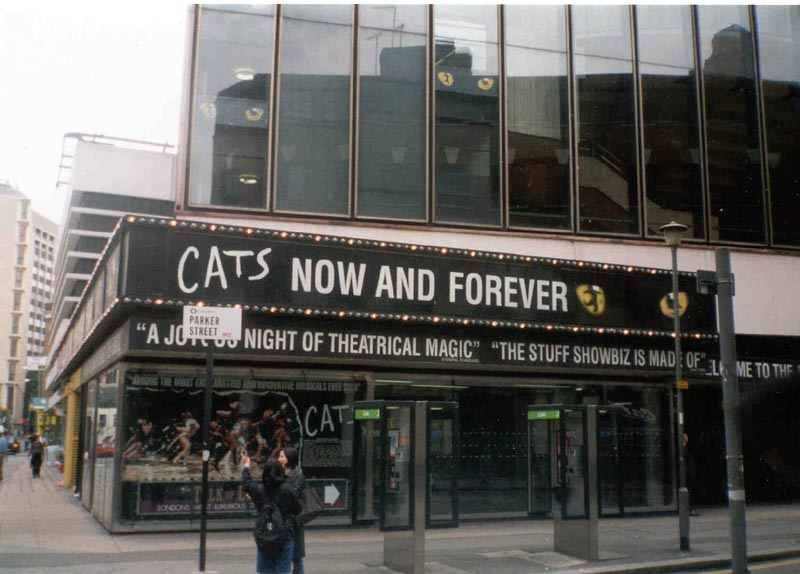
The cat's-eyes logo and the "now and forever" slogan were used to advertise the musical at the New London Theatre (1999).

Cats introduced a marketing strategy that set the template for subsequent megamusicals. Early advertisements for the musical did not feature traditional pull quotes (despite many positive reviews) or any of the cast, instead branding the show itself as the star. It did this by adopting — and then aggressively promoting — a single recognisable image (the cat's-eyes logo) as the face of the show. The cat's-eyes logo was the first globally marketed logo in musical theatre history, and was paired with a tagline ("now and forever") to create what The Daily Telegraph called "one of musical theatre's greatest posters". Such branding emblems proved equally effective for later megamusicals, as seen with the waif Cosette for Les Misérables and the Phantom's mask for The Phantom of the Opera. This advertising method had the additional effect of diminishing the importance of critical reviews, popularising the so-called "critic-proof" status of megamusicals.

Additionally, Cats was the first Broadway and West End show to capitalise on merchandising as a major revenue stream. Stalls were set up in the theatre lobbies to sell souvenirs ranging from toys and watches to coffee mugs, all of which were emblazoned with the cat's-eyes logo. The official Cats t-shirt became the second-best-selling t-shirt in the world in the 1980s, second only to the Hard Rock Cafe t-shirt. Merchandising has since become an important source of income for the industry.

Beyond the megamusical, Cats also led the Broadway trend for musicals aimed at families and tourists, which later took the form of the Disney Theatrical Productions and jukebox musicals. The marketing campaigns for the musical targeted family audiences at a time when this demographic was not a consideration in the industry. Composer Joe Raposo said of family musicals in 1986: "Cats is a wonderful proof of what an audience is out there, untapped. People do want a theatrical experience for their children." Thanks to its easily accessible spectacle, the original Broadway production also tapped into the then-burgeoning tourist boom in New York and its audience shifted increasingly towards foreign visitors in its later years. Billington also specifically traces the rise of the jukebox musical genre back to Cats, citing the latter's disregard for dramatic text in favour of an all-encompassing theatrical experience.

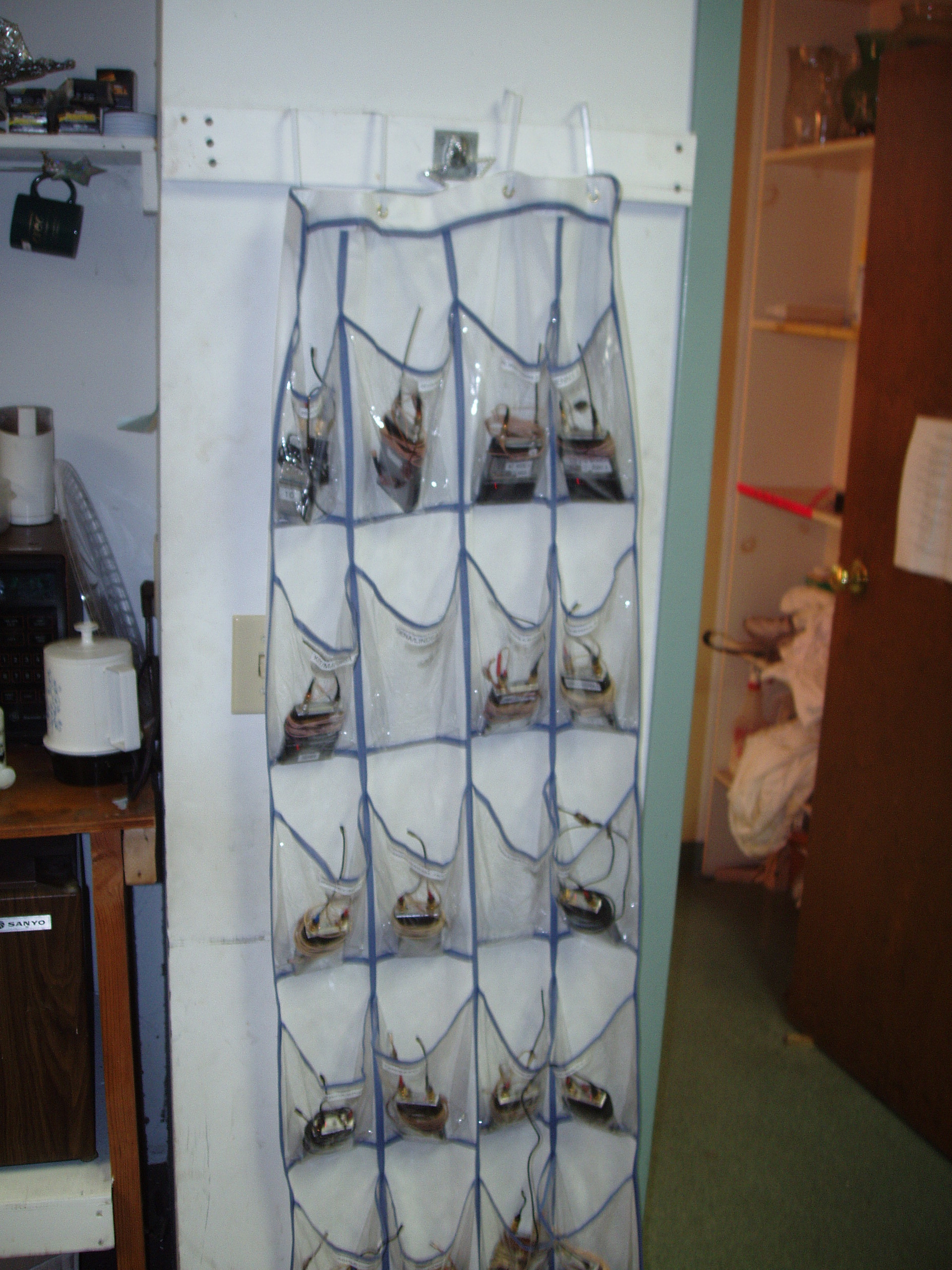
Radio microphones have become the norm in live theatre since Cats.

The musical's fantasy setting and disregard for verisimilitude allowed for groundbreaking experimentations in lighting and audio technology. The original London and Broadway productions featured David Hersey's pioneering use of automated lighting to produce kaleidoscopic landscapes and complicated optical effects. Hersey also used light in an "architectural manner", with fast-changing configurations to spotlight different performers in rapid succession. This dynamic shifting of the audience's perspective created an effect similar to that of fast cutting in film editing. The original London production of Cats was also the first known instance in which an entire cast was individually outfitted with radio microphones. The departure from shared ambient microphones meant that the show did not have to depend on the acoustics and architectural design of the theatrical venue, and enabled the sound designer to achieve cinematic levels of sound amplification and studio-quality audio in live theatre. This practice transformed sound design and has since become the norm in live theatre.

Cats opened new regional, touring and international markets that the industry continues to capitalise on. Recognising the global potential of his show, Mackintosh replicated the original production worldwide with an unprecedented degree of standardisation. Paraphrasing theatre historian Alan Filewod, Marla Carlson wrote:

Cats began the progressive transformation of "Broadway" from a specific location into a delocalized "moment of reception" that can be experienced anywhere and everywhere, even while continuing to depend upon the stamp of approval that box-office success in an actual Broadway theater bestows.

In the 1980s, the success of local productions of Cats in Tokyo, Sydney, Vienna, Hamburg, and Toronto were turning points that established these cities (and their respective countries) as major commercial markets in the global theatrical circuit. The musical was also a boon for the Broadway touring industry. In 1997, The New York Times credited the regional and touring productions of Cats with "almost single-handedly reviv[ing] the sagging road business". Cats revolutionised the touring business by introducing the now commonplace practice of extended touring engagements that can last several weeks or months in a single city, as opposed to the typical one-week or ten-day tour stop. Mackintosh's insistence that all touring productions of Cats replicate the Broadway production also resulted in the expansion and upgrading of regional theatre venues to accommodate the musical's demanding logistical requirements, as local theatre owners did not want to miss out on the opportunity to host the lucrative show.

=== "Memory" ===
"Memory" is the standout hit song from Cats. By 2002, the song had been played over two million times on radio and television stations in the US. It was the most requested song at piano bars and lounges in the 1980s, and was an equally popular choice at weddings, concerts and other gatherings. As of 2006, the song had been recorded around 600 times by artists such as Barbra Streisand, Barry Manilow, Judy Collins, and Johnny Mathis, in covers ranging from easy listening to techno. According to Sternfeld, it is "by some estimations the most successful song ever from a musical."

=== Creators ===
Cats was the ground-breaking show for all of us ... The success of it gave us all the freedom to go on and do other shows.

— Mackintosh

Despite moderate hits with Jesus Christ Superstar and Evita, Lloyd Webber was still relatively unknown to the general public before Cats, especially in the US. With Cats, he became a big celebrity in his own right. The musical also established the theatrical careers of the original creative and production team. Following Cats, they collaborated on other global blockbusters including Starlight Express (composed by Lloyd Webber, directed by Nunn and designed by Napier), Les Misérables (directed by Nunn, designed by Napier and produced by Mackintosh), and The Phantom of the Opera (composed by Lloyd Webber, choreographed by Lynne and produced by Mackintosh).

The New London Theatre, where the original London production of Cats played for 21 years, was officially renamed the Gillian Lynne Theatre in 2018. This made Lynne the first non-royal woman to have a West End theatre named after her.

Valerie Eliot used a portion of the royalty payments from Cats to establish the literary charity Old Possum's Practical Trust, and to set up the T. S. Eliot Prize which has since become "the most coveted award in poetry". Cats also turned things around for the independent British publishing house Faber and Faber. As the publisher of Old Possum's Book of Practical Cats, royalties of up to £1 million annually kept the then-struggling Faber afloat during the 1980s. Moreover, the musical led to a surge in the sales of Eliot's book. The success of Cats led Faber to turn another of their literary properties, Ted Hughes' The Iron Man, into a 1989 musical of the same name.

=== In popular culture ===
Cats has been referenced many times on screen; from the films Six Degrees of Separation and Team America: World Police, to the sketch comedy Saturday Night Live, and animated series like Family Guy, The Simpsons and BoJack Horseman, as well as live action comedies including The Golden Girls, Caroline in the City, Glee and Unbreakable Kimmy Schmidt. An episode of the musical television series Crazy Ex-Girlfriend, titled "I Need Some Balance", parodied Cats by having all the songs sung by anthropomorphic cats who "introduce [themselves] over '80s Broadway beats". The sitcom The Nanny includes a recurring plot of rivalry between Andrew Lloyd Webber and the character Maxwell Sheffield. The latter is often taunted by other characters with reminders that he declined to produce Cats.

Stage parodies of the musical have also been mounted in the West End and Off-Broadway. CAT – (THE PLAY!!!), a one-man show written by Jamie Beamish and Richard Hardwick, is a dark comedy about the fictitious life of Dave, a cat who was fired from the original London production of Cats on opening night. Starring Gerard McCarthy as Dave and with choreography by Arlene Phillips, the musical premiered at the 2014 Edinburgh Fringe Festival; it performed at various regional venues before making its West End debut at the Ambassadors Theatre in April 2017. Katdashians! Break the Musical!, a parody mashup of Keeping Up with the Kardashians and Cats by Bob and Tobly McSmith, premiered Off-Broadway at the Elektra Theatre in June 2016. All the song parodies of Cats were later removed after accusations of copyright infringement from Lloyd Webber's representatives, who claimed the songs were being used "to parody another subject matter entirely". Other stage shows that satirise Cats include Six Degrees of Separation, Angels in America, and The Musical of Musicals (The Musical!).

Madame Tussauds New York features wax figures of several characters from the musical, including one of Grizabella that sings "Memory" through the use of projection mapping technology. Similarly, a wax figure of Rumpleteazer is displayed at the Panoptikum wax museum in Hamburg, Germany.

A Cats postage stamp was issued by the United States Postal Service in 2000 as part of its Celebrate the Century series. The musical was chosen as one of fifteen "outstanding artifacts, events and activities" from the 1980s to be commemorated with its own stamp design. Beginning in March 2019, the Rinkai Line in Tokyo, Japan, uses two songs from the musical for its train departure melodies at the Ōimachi Station; the train to Ōsaki Station uses a jingle from "Memory", while the train to Shin-Kiba Station uses a jingle from "Skimbleshanks: The Railway Cat".

The visual effects of the 2019 film adaptation were mocked in the 2022 Disney film Chip 'n' Dale: Rescue Rangers, in a scene where the titular characters notice two alley cats resembling the ones in the film as they venture through an "uncanny valley" part of town.

== Recordings and music video ==
=== Cast recordings ===
List of cast recordings, with selected chart positions, sales figures and certifications
Cast	Album details	Peak chart positions								Sales	Certifications
Cast	Album details	US	AUS	AUT	GER	JPN	NED	NZ	UK	Sales	Certifications
Original London cast	Released: 1 July 1981 (UK), July 1982 (US); Label: PolyGram (UK), Geffen Records (US); Formats: LP, cassette, 2-disc CD	86	44	7				21	6		UK: Silver (1981); Gold (1993); SWI: Platinum
Original Broadway cast	Released: 26 January 1983 (US); Label: Geffen Records (US); Formats: LP, cassette, CD	131	–	5				17		WW: >2,000,000	US: Platinum
Original Viennese cast	Released: 1983; Label: Polydor Records; Formats: CD		–	1	24						AUT: Platinum; SWI: Platinum; GER: Gold
Original Australian cast	Released: 1985; Label: EMI; Formats: CD		19								
Original Japanese cast	Released: 21 April 1985; Label: Pony Canyon; Formats: CD; Live recording		–								
Original Hamburg cast	Released: 6 October 1986; Label: Polydor Records; Formats: LP, CD; Live recording		–	12							
Original Dutch cast	Released: 1987; Label: Mercury Records; Formats: CD; Live recording		–				72				
Original London cast (Highlights from Cats)	Released: 1989; Label: Polydor Records; Formats: CD		–								UK: Silver (1993); SWI: Gold
Japanese cast	Released: 8 February 1989; Label: Pony Canyon; Formats: CD		–								
Original French cast	Released: 1989; Label: Polydor Records; Formats: LP, cassette, CD; Live recording		–								
Original Mexican cast	Released: 1991; Label: Polydor Records; Formats: CD		–								
Original Polish cast	Released: 12 January 2004; Label: Universal Music Polska; Formats: CD		-								
Dutch cast	Released: December 2006; Label: Universal Music; Formats: CD; Highlights		–								
Original Italian cast	Released: 26 January 2010; Label: Compagnia della Rancia; Formats: CD; Live recording		–								
Japanese cast	Released: 24 April 2019; Label: Universal Music Japan; Formats: CD		–			13					
Film cast	Released: 20 December 2019; Label: Universal Music; Formats: CD		–								

=== Music video ===
Title	Year	Director(s)	Details	Ref.
"The Rum Tum Tugger"	1985	Jeff Lee	Starring original Broadway cast member Terrence Mann as Rum Tum Tugger, the musical number was re-arranged and re-staged for a music video. It was the first music video created to promote a Broadway show.	

== Revisions and cut material ==
The stage production of Cats has undergone several revisions since its London opening. When the show transferred to Broadway, several cuts and rewrites were made with the intention of appealing more to an American audience. Additionally, the song "Cat Morgan Introduces Himself" was cut during initial development. Lloyd Webber performed this song at the show's 6,138th Broadway performance, when it broke the record to become the longest-running Broadway show.

=== "Growltiger's Last Stand" ===
The "Growltiger's Last Stand" sequence has been changed multiple times over the course of the show's history. In the original London production, the "last duet" for Growltiger and Griddlebone was a setting for an unpublished Eliot poem, "The Ballad of Billy M'Caw". For the original Broadway production, the Ballad was replaced with "In Una Tepida Notte", a parody of Italian opera with more slapstick humour. This new version was eventually incorporated into all other productions of Cats.

"Growltiger's Last Stand" has been criticised as being racially offensive. The original lyrics, taken directly from the Eliot poem it is based on, included the ethnic slur "Chinks" and this was later replaced with the word "Siamese". The number also originally involved the cast putting on "Asian accents" to portray the Siamese cats. In the 1998 video version, the entire scene featuring Growltiger was cut. By 2016, "Growltiger's Last Stand" had been removed completely from the US and UK productions of the show, however, the 2026 Regent's Park production has reintroduced it.

=== Mungojerrie and Rumpleteazer ===
In the original London production, Mungojerrie and Rumpleteazer were characters in their own right and sang their eponymous song themselves as a singsong-style duet. When the show transferred to Broadway, the song was instead sung in the third-person, with Mungojerrie and Rumpleteazer as puppets being magically controlled by Mr. Mistoffelees. Their number was also rewritten to be faster and more upbeat, alternating between vaudeville-style verses and a "manic patter" section. Eventually, the Broadway version of the song was rewritten to allow Mungojerrie and Rumpleteazer to once again sing their own song as full characters.

=== Rum Tum Tugger ===
The 2014 London revival introduced several modernisations to the show. Rum Tum Tugger was reworked from a ladies-man rockstar to a breakdancing street cat. His eponymous musical number was also turned into a rap. The 2015 Australian tour and 2015 Paris production also used the new version of the character; however, the 2016 Broadway revival, and other subsequent productions thereafter, did not.

=== Choreography ===
The 2016 Broadway revival featured new choreography by Andy Blankenbuehler, who introduced more hip hop and cool jazz elements to the movements and dances. Blankenbuehler's choreography for the ensemble numbers did not differ too much from the original by Lynne, but significant changes were made in several solo numbers, including "The Rum Tum Tugger" and "Mr. Mistoffelees".

Preceded by A Chorus Line	Longest-running Broadway show 1997–2006	Succeeded by The Phantom of the Opera
