= Simon Rice =

British ballet dancer (born 20th century

Simon Rice (born 20th century) is a British ballet dancer.

He trained at the Royal Ballet Schools before joining The Royal Ballet company in 1982, becoming a First Soloist in 1989.

== The Royal Ballet ==
He danced lead and supporting roles in choreographic works by:

- Sir Frederick Ashton: The Dream - Puck and Bottom, A Month in The Country - Kolya, Cinderella - The Jester, La Fille Mal Gardée - Alain, Les Patineurs - Blue Boy;
- Jerome Robbins: The Concert - The Shy Boy;
- Anthony Dowell: Swan Lake - The Neapolitan;
- Natalia Makarova: La Bayadère - The Bronze Idol;
- Sir Peter Wright: The Nutcracker - The Nutcracker and Fritz;
- David Bintley: Prometheus - The Creature, Sons of Horus - Hopi;
- Sir Kenneth MacMillan: Elite Syncopations - Alaskan Rag and Friday Night, Mayerling - Bratfisch, Prince of the Pagodas - The Fool, and The Rite of Spring - The Chosen One – the first male dancer to perform this role.

== Other work ==
Shortly after going freelance in 1992 Rice danced in Carousel at The National Theatre and performed Mr. Mistoffelees in Cats. He worked with Fabulous Beast Dance Theatre (1998 to 2007) appearing in Sunday Lunch, Fragile, The Flower Bed, James, son of James and Giselle. From 1999 to 2004 he danced as a guest artist for K-ballet in Japan, with roles in Wolfgang, Don Quixote, Swan Lake and The Sleeping Beauty. For K-ballet he choreographed The Vary People, performed in Japan and at the Festival dei Due Mondi, Spoleto, Italy. In opera, Rice danced the role of Puck in The Fairy-Queen at the English National Opera in 1996 and 1999 and acted the role of Puck at the Nationaltheater Mannheim in Germany in A Midsummer Night's Dream in 2002 and 2003. Other work includes The Skin of Our Teeth at the Young Vic (2004), Everyday for The Corn Exchange at the Dublin Theatre Festival (2006) and Side Effects for dANTE OR dIE (2011).

== Recent ==
- Founded flamingofeather, a physical theatre company, in 2007 with Brazilian actress Ilana Gorban. Directed works such as Chasing My Tale, which was performed in São Paulo and at the Wellcome Trust in London as part of The Handle with Care event and Drina, inspired by João Guimarães Rosa’s short story. He created and performed the solo work, The Beekeeper, in London and Rio de Janeiro.
- Launched professional dance company Abundance, early in 2011. They performed Grace, choreographed by Simon Rice, at the Royal Opera House as part of Draft Works in the Linbury in January 2012.
- Founded community dance company Sage, in 2010, to focus on creating choreographic work for dancers over 55.
- Awarded The Winston Churchill Memorial Trusts Fellowship 2010 to study models for social inclusion in Brazil.
