= Carbucketty =

- Cats character
- First appearance: Cats (1981)
- Created by: Andrew Lloyd Webber
- Based on: Old Possum's Book of Practical Cats by T. S. Eliot

Cast of the filmed version of Cats. Pouncival centre front row

Carbucketty is a character from the musical Cats. The name was one of T. S. Eliot's ideas for cat names, for a "knockabout cat". His role is primarily that of a dancer and acrobat.

Carbucketty appeared in both the original London and Broadway shows. In 1987, when the Broadway show was reworked, the character was renamed Mungojerrie. The actor who played Mungojerrie after the show was reworked, Ray Roderick, had played Carbucketty for a few months prior.

Carbucketty's costume suggests a Bi-colour tabby and white kitten. He has defined stripes as well as spots on a white base. A short fluffy wig and chunky warmers give the impression of a young, fluffy kitten.

Most fans consider Carbucketty to be a counterpart of Pouncival- a kitten with a similar personality and design who appears in many productions around the world. This may be because for the filmed version of the show the costume and role of Carbucketty was named Pouncival, as it was deemed more sensible for an international market to use the names used internationally. However Carbucketty and Pouncival is one and the same part. For the entire record breaking 21-year run of Cats in London the part was named Carbucketty.

Carbucketty was originally played by Luke Baxter in the original London production. Jye Frasca was the final Carbucketty in the West End Production at the New London Theatre 2002.

A UK tour started at the Theatre Royal, Plymouth in February 2003 with Paul Farrell as Carbucketty.

UK Tour Carbucketty’s: Paul Farrell 2003, Richard Curto 2003-04, Philip Comley 2004-05, Kevin McGuire 2006-07, Craig Turbyfield 2007-08,

Joel Morris played the role from the beginning of the 2013-14 UK & Europe tour until May 2014, returning to the tour in August 2014 due to cast injury and remaining in the role until the tour's end in November, transferring across to the London Palladium revival of the show, once again reprising the role of Carbucketty from the opening in December 2014 until the run's end in April 2015. Morris briefly returned to the role in April 2017 during the international tour's stops in Croatia and Belgium, again due to cast injury.

Broadway show of 2016 features Giuseppe Bausilio as Carbucketty.
