= "Tempress" Chasity Moore =

American ballroom performer

"Tempress" Chasity Moore is a ballroom performer and the founder of the house of Maison Margiela. She is best known for her performance as Grizabella in Cats: The Jellicle Ball on Broadway.

== Performance ==
Moore is the founder and Queen Mother of The House of Maison Margiela in the New York ballroom scene, which she began in 2018. She is an icon in the ballroom scene, meaning that she has been performing for more than 20 years. In 2023, Moore was inducted into the Ballroom Hall of Fame. Prior to founding her own house, she served as a house mother in the House of Chanley and House of Allure, and was part of the House of Miyake-Muglar.

She was "discovered" by Tyler Perry her freshman year of college, when he saw her in a musical with Jomandi Productions. Shortly after, she was cast in Tyler Perry's gospel musical I Know I've Been Changed. She appeared in the television series Pose. In addition, she competed on the television series Star Search.

In 2026, she made her Broadway debut in Cats: The Jellicle Ball as Grizabella, reprising her role from the original off-Broadway production at PAC NYC in 2024.

== Personal life ==
Moore was born and raised in Mount Vernon, New York where she sang at her church at a young age. She attended Clark Atlanta University. Moore has lived in New York on and off for "about 30 years." She is a transgender woman.
