= Gilles Ramade =

French musician

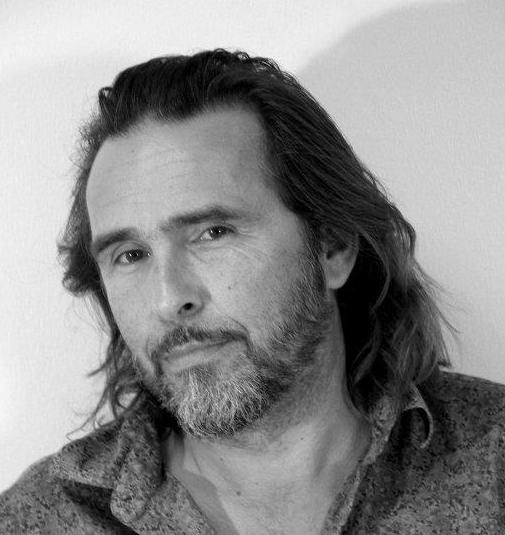
Gilles Ramade

Gilles Ramade is a French playwright, director, pianist, composer, actor, lyrical singer, conductor, writer, editor and producer.

He was born in 1958 in Albi, in the region of the Tarn, in southern France. His parents were both schoolteachers, and he grew up in the Albi region, first in Vaour (1958 to 1962), then at Cabannes, a small village near Cordes sur Ciel, and in Albi where he stayed until age 20.

After working and practicing piano with Bruno Rigutto and Pierre Sancan, he started off his career by playing piano in bars, restaurants and hotels, and went on to become an accompanist for the Capitole Ballet in Toulouse.

In 1988, he graduated from the National Conservatoire of Toulouse and was awarded the first prize in dramatic arts and electroacoustics as well as the gold medal of lyrical arts with jury's congratulations, in singing and musical theory. In 1988, he won the Golden Voices Competition in Rouen.

As he became known in the classical music and opera world, he was invited to national and international theaters around the world, and sang with Anna Prucnal, José van Dam and Chriss Meritt. He worked with Luigi Alva, Marcel Landowski, Michel Plasson, Jean-Claude Casadesus and Jérôme Savary, with whom he notably played Don Giovanni, Pelléas, Figaro, Escamillo, Falstaff and Mackie in Brecht's Threepenny Opera.

In 1988, he was chosen for the creation of one of the leading roles of the musical Cats, which was then awarded the Molière of the best musical in 1989.

In 1992 he created his own company of musical theater, Figaro & Co., and went on to write and direct over sixty plays, musicals and operas.

As both a writer and a director, he worked to break down and overcome the barriers between the arts and challenge audiences with new material, creating startling encounters between closed up artistic worlds. In his shows, lyrical art meets Queen's rock music and ties in with the Marx Brothers’ burlesque humour, Don José slams his love to Carmen and Romeo proclaims his hatred for Juliet (Romeo Hait Juliette).

With his adaptation of Carmina Burana with 600 chorists in 2010, he directed and designed his hundredth production on the stage of Toulouse's Zenith.

Many of his shows are staged in France where he recently staged productions like Casanova l’indécent, A Taxi for Broadway, Maestro Furioso, Led Zep 129. He says his creations are nourished by his experience and formation as a pianist, and he has teamed up with Jéremy Ferrari, a popular French humourist, for his one-man show Piano Furioso Opus 2.

"You are one of the rare french creators with a sense of the theater in your compositions" Claude Michel Schonberg about Gilles Ramade
