= Rumpus Cat =

Fictional character

The Great Rumpus Cat
- Cats character
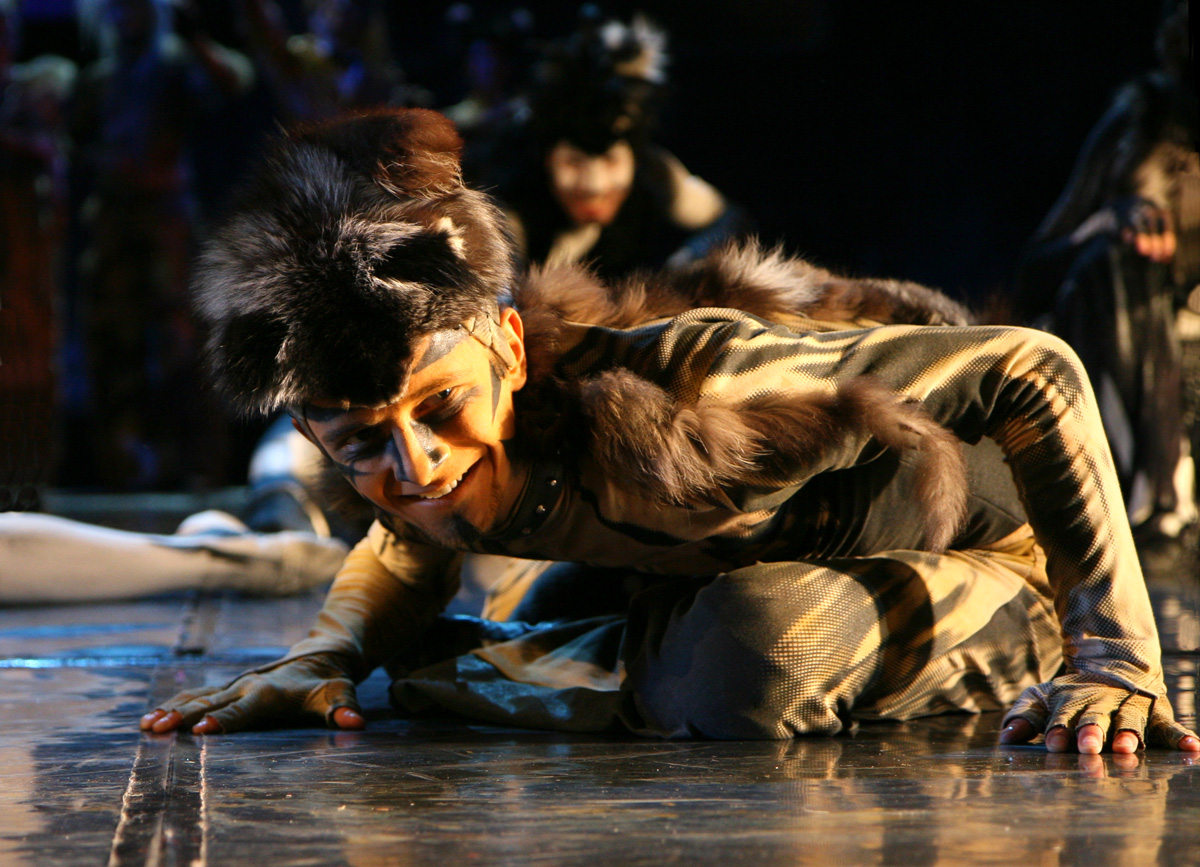
- Karol Tymiński as The Great Rumpus Cat in the non-replica Polish production of Cats, 2007.
- First appearance: Cats (1981)
- Created by: Andrew Lloyd Webber
- Based on: Old Possum's Book of Practical Cats by T. S. Eliot

The Great Rumpus Cat is a fictional character from T.S. Eliot's 1939 book Old Possum's Book of Practical Cats and in Andrew Lloyd Webber's 1981 musical, Cats.

The Great Rumpus Cat appears in the poem "Of the Awefull Battle of the Pekes and the Pollicles." The poem describes a contentious encounter between a Peke and a Pollicle dog, which eventually leads to the participation of other dogs and a great deal of barking heard throughout the park. The Great Rumpus Cat nonchalantly intervenes and scatters the dogs merely by his threatening appearance and a single great leap. The Great Rumpus Cat is described as having blazing eyes, great jaws, and a fierce and hairy presence. Pollicle ("poor little") refers to many types of dogs, whereas Pekes, Poms, and Pugs all correspond to actual breeds.

In Cats, the Jellicles put on a small play when their leader, Old Deuteronomy, arrives. The story is about how Rumpus Cat stopped two neighboring dog clans, the Pekes and Pollicles, from fighting.

Steven Wayne played the part in the original London West End production, doubling as George, and Kenneth Ard, doubling as Macavity created the part on Broadway. It appears, as his costume in the film version suggests, that he is considered a type of superhero in the Jellicle society. In the film version, Rumpus Cat is played by Frank Thompson who also plays Admetus. In the 2016 Broadway revival, The Rumpus Cat was played by Christopher Gurr, who also played Bustopher Jones and Gus the Theater Cat. The Rumpus Cat is a replacement for Growltiger in this revival.
