= Josephine Kearns =

American theatre artist

Josephine "Josie" Kearns is an American dramaturg, theatre creative, and gender consultant. She is best known for her work on Cats: The Jellicle Ball, which premiered on Broadway in 2026.

== Early life and education ==
Kearnes graduated from Roycemore School in 2001, where she was her class's senior speaker. She attended the George Washington University, where she received a bachelor's degree in theatre in 2004.

== Career ==
In 2019, Kearns consulted on a production of Guys and Dolls at the Wirtz Center for the Performing Arts at Northwestern University as part of Chicago Theatre Week. She has worked with the MCC Theater, Playwrights Horizon, Delaware Theatre, Chicago Shakespeare, Seattle Rep, Fifth Avenue Theatre, East West Players, and Royal Manitoba. In 2022, Kearns co-curated the inaugural Breaking the Binary Theatre Festival.

In 2024, Kearnes, alongside Bill Rauch and Omari Wiles, adapted Andrew Lloyd Webber's Cats as a drag ball. Cats: The Jellicle Ball premiered off-Broadway at the Perelman Center, before transferring to Broadway in 2026 and winning three Tony awards.

Outside of her work in theatre, Kearns served as a Gender Program Coordinator at Lurie Children's Hospital in Chicago. She also was a research specialist for TransFocus, a consulting firm focused on gender diversity work, and conducts gender inclusivity trainings for schools, hospitals, businesses, nonprofits, and theatres.

== Awards and distinctions ==
In 2020, she was named a 'person to watch' by American Theatre Magazine. In 2023, Kearns was named as the Roycemore School's Distinguished Alumna and spoke at their graduation ceremony.

According to Andrea Prestinario, co-founder of Ring of Keys, Kearns is the only theatre creative in the United States with gender consulting as her primary focus.

== Personal life ==
Kearns is polyamorous. She has a wife and two kids.
