= Femi Taylor =

Nigerian-born British dancer and actress (born 1961)

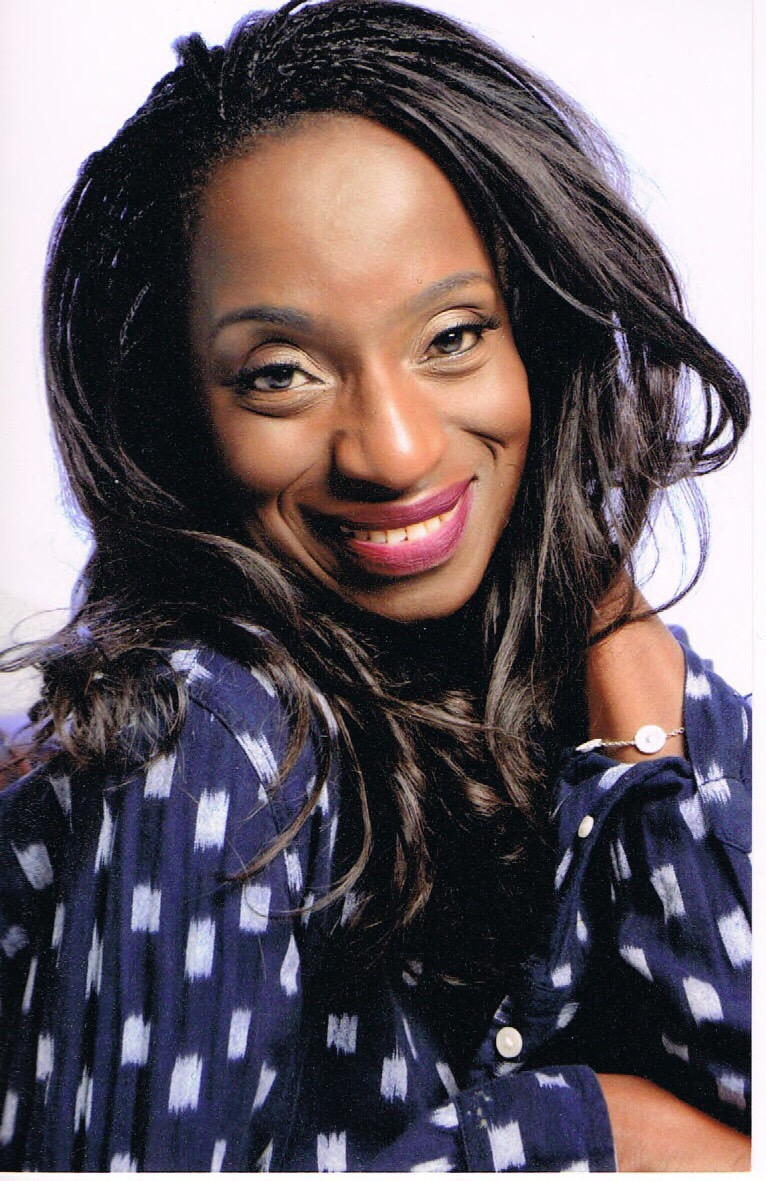
- Taylor in 2018
- Born: 8 April 1961 (age 65); Nigeria
- Occupations: Actress, dancer
- Years active: 1979–present
- Spouse: Claus Skytte
- Children: 2

Femi Taylor (born 8 April 1961) is a Nigerian-born British dancer and actress, best known for portraying Jabba the Hutt's Twi'lek slave dancer Oola in the 1983 motion picture Return of the Jedi.

She is the sister of Benedict Taylor.

== Career ==
Taylor portrayed the slave dancer Oola in Return of the Jedi, the last film of the original trilogy. She reprised the part fourteen years later, filming new scenes for the 1997 Special Edition release, and was the only performer from the original to do so. Because of this role, she appears at science fiction and Star Wars conventions around the world.

Taylor was cast as Tantomile in the 1981 original London production of the musical Cats, during which she learned she had been cast as Oola for Return of the Jedi. She appeared in the 1998 TV movie version of Cats as Exotica, a character that was created specially for her and exclusively for the film.

== Personal life ==
Taylor lives in Odense, Denmark, has two children and is married to Claus Skytte.

== Filmography ==
=== Film ===
Year	Title	Role	Notes
1980	The Apple	Dancer	
1983	Return of the Jedi	Oola	
1987	Playing Away	Masie	
1990	A Kink in the Picasso	Nadia	
1991	Flirting	Letitia Adjewa	
1997	Return of the Jedi: Special Edition	Oola	Featuring newly recorded footage specifically for this version.
1998	Cats	Exotica	

=== Television ===
Year	Title	Role	Notes
1984	Miracles Take Longer	Tracy Benedict	2 episodes
1986	The Bill	Nurse	Episode: Loan Shark
1986	ScreenPlay	Linda	Episode: Drums Along Balmoral Drive
