= Sydney James Harcourt =

American stage performer

- Born: April 2, 1979 (age 47); Detroit, Michigan
- Education: Interlochen Arts Academy
- Occupations: Actor, singer, dancer
- Known for: Hamilton and Cats: The Jellicle Ball
- Spouse: Zlatko Malovic (2015-present)
- Website: sydneyharcourt.com

Sydney James Harcourt (born April 2, 1979) is an actor and dancer who originated the Broadway roles of James Reynolds in Hamilton and Rum Tum Tugger in Cats: The Jellicle Ball.

== Early life and education ==
Harcourt was born and raised in Detroit, Michigan, the son of a touring jazz pianist and a public school English teacher. He studied theatre at Interlochen Arts Academy.

After graduating, he moved to New York City and soon became a fixture in the underground ball culture scene.

== Career ==
He made his Broadway debut in the 2001 revival of Bells Are Ringing followed by roles in Green Day's American Idiot, as Simba in Disney's The Lion King and as Joe Scott in Girl from the North Country, for which he was nominated for a Drama Desk Award .

In 2015 he originated the role of James Reynolds in the Public Theater and Broadway productions of Hamilton, a role for which he also won a Grammy Award.

In 2024, he originated the role of Rum Tum Tugger in the off-Broadway revival of Cats: The Jellicle Ball and later transferred to Broadway with the role in 2026, earning a nomination for Outstanding Dancer in a Broadway Show from the Chita Rivera Awards.

He has also appeared in films such as Disney's Enchanted and on the TV series Blue Bloods, NCIS, Elementary, Younger, The Good Wife, and Law and Order.

He has also toured across North America and internationally as a vocalist. He was the featured artist at the US Open Finals live broadcast honoring the 50th anniversary of Billie Jean King's Triple Crown, opened for Donna Summer, and introduced then Vice President Joe Biden at the opening of the Museum of the American Revolution. Harcout has performed Shakespeare at the Interlochen Center for the Arts Shakespeare Festival and has also served on Interlochen's board of trustees.

Along with FēRL, he released his first single, "Deviant", on August 21, 2026.

== Personal life ==
Harcourt is openly gay. He has been married to Zlatko Malovic since 2015.

== Awards and nominations ==
Year	Association	Category	Production	Result
2019	Drama Desk Award	Outstanding Featured Actor in a Musical	Girl from the North Country	Nominated
2019	Lucille Lortel Award	Outstanding Featured Actor in a Musical	Girl from the North Country	Nominated
2026	Chita Rivera Awards for Dance and Choreography	Outstanding Dancer in a Broadway Show	Cats: The Jellicle Ball	Nominated
