= Gen Horiuchi =

Japanese ballet dancer and choreographer

Gen Horiuchi (Japanese: 堀内 元) is a Japanese ballet dancer and choreographer. He was a principal dancer of the New York City Ballet and is artistic director of the Saint Louis Ballet Company.

== Biography ==
Gen Horiuchi (Hajime Gen Horiuchi) was born in Tokyo, Japan on 29 August 1964. He was raised in a ballet family: his parents were both professional dancers and own their own studio in Tokyo.

In 1980, Horiuchi won the Prix de Lausanne, the international ballet competition in Switzerland. He then received a scholarship to study at the School of American Ballet.

In 1982, he was invited by George Balanchine to join the New York City Ballet, where he became a principal dancer in 1989. He appeared in the 1993 film The Nutcracker in the role of Chinese tea. He played Mr. Mistoffelees in the musical "Cats", both on Broadway and in London's West End. He choreographed the opening ceremony of the Winter Olympics in Nagano, Japan. Since 1993 he has been a judge of the Prix de Lausanne.

Since 2000 he has been artistic director of the Saint Louis Ballet Company and School. He has created a dozen original works for the company. Under his direction, the school rose from 50 students in 2000 to 350 in 2008.
