= Growltiger's Last Stand =

Poem by T.S. Eliot

Growltiger is a fictional character appearing in both T. S. Eliot's Old Possum's Book of Practical Cats and Andrew Lloyd Webber's musical Cats which is based on Eliot's book. He is described as a "bravo cat who lived upon a barge", one who scoured the Thames from Gravesend to Oxford, terrorizing the inhabitants along the river, including "cottagers", canaries, geese, hens, "pampered Pekinese", and the "bristly Bandicoot that lurks on foreign ships". Growltiger is usually envisioned as a pirate, although he is never explicitly described as such. He has lost one eye, and one of his ears is "somewhat missing" after an incident involving a Siamese cat.

"Growltiger's Last Stand" describes how he meets his fate when he least expects it.

Besides the Andrew Lloyd Webber musical setting in Cats the English composer Humphrey Searle composed a musical setting of "Growltiger's Last Stand" as the second of his Two Practical Cats for speaker, flute, cello and guitar.

T. S. Eliot used the names of a dozen villages and cities along the Thames River to lend a very specific flavour to "Growtiger's Last Stand".

== Cats ==
In the Andrew Lloyd Webber musical Cats the poem is used nearly verbatim as the lyrics of the song, except that one stanza has been cut.

The song appears as a reminiscence by "Gus the Theatre Cat", who "once played Growltiger – could do it again". In most productions, the actor who plays Gus then becomes Growltiger, while Gus's companion Jellylorum becomes Growltiger's love interest, Griddlebone. Growltiger's crew of cats is played by male members of the troupe with pirate accoutrements over their cat costumes.

There have been two different "last duets" for Growltiger and Griddlebone to sing during this scene. In the original London production, they sing a setting of an unpublished T.S. Eliot poem, "The Ballad of Billy M'Caw". This poem is a reminiscence of good times at the "old Bull and Bush" and the crowd at that bar on a "Sattaday night", in particular the barmaid Lily La Rose and the parrot Billy M'Caw. The initial New York production of Cats replaced "The Ballad of Billy M'Caw" with a "pastiche Italian aria" titled "In Una Tepida Notte," which was "felt to be more of a crowd pleaser". The lyrics for the aria come from the original Italian translation of "Growltiger's Last Stand". Lloyd Webber "much prefers" "Billy M'Caw", and in the 2003 UK touring production, "The Ballad of Billy M'Caw" was re-instated and has subsequently replaced the aria in most productions.

After Growltiger and Griddlebone finish their duet, the Siamese cats, led by Gilbert (in the original London show and in T.S. Eliot's poem, renamed Genghis in the New York version), "swarm aboard" the barge. Griddlebone escapes in terror and the Siamese make Growltiger walk the plank, ending the song. (In the New York version there was a short sword fight between Genghis and Growltiger before Growltiger's demise). At this point, Gus returns with a short reprise.

"Growltiger's Last Stand" does not appear in the 1998 filmed version of the musical – Gus only sings his initial song. This was primarily due to the age of Sir John Mills, who played Gus in the filmed version, as well as time restraints.

=== Controversy ===
Eliot's poem "Growltiger's Last Stand" includes the racial epithet "chinks" in reference to the Siamese cats. The word was used in early versions of the musical, but was later changed to "Siamese". The musical also received criticism as non-Asian cast members originally used "stereotyped Asian accents" when portraying the Siamese cats. By 2016, the song had been dropped from US and UK productions of the show altogether.

== Actors who have played the part ==
Actors who have played the part on stage include Stephen Nathan, Eddie Korbich, Bronson N. Murphy (US National Tour), Matt Bartlett, Christopher E. Sidoli, Stephen Mo Hanan (1983 Tony Nominee), Ryan Bailey, Sal Minstretta, Nathan Morgan, Kelly Robertson, Bill Remps, Ethan Jones, George Breynard and Christopher Scott.

On screen, Ray Winstone portrayed this role in the 2019 film adaptation.

== Notes ==
- Lloyd Webber, Andrew (2005) Cats, Vocal Book, R & H Theatricals, New York.
