= List of fictional cats in literature =

This list of fictional cats in literature is subsidiary to the list of fictional cats. It is restricted solely to notable feline characters from notable literary works of fiction. For characters that appear in several separate works, only the earliest work will be recorded here.

== Named ==
Character	Earliest appearance	Author	Notes
Alonzo	Old Possum's Book of Practical Cats	T. S. Eliot	A black and white tom, often considered the 'second-hand-man' to Munkustrap. He saves Demeter from Macavity, and is the first to attack him after he defeats Munkustrap.
Aristotle	The Nine Lives of Aristotle	Dick King-Smith	A kitten depends on his nine lives and the magical powers of his owner (a friendly witch) in order to emerge safely from various adventures.
Azreel	Doctor Sleep	Stephen King	This cat living at the hospice where Dan works has the special ability to feel when someone is about to die.
Bangs	Sam, Bangs and Moonshine	Evaline Ness	Bangs is a little girl's cat in this winner of the 1967 Caldecott Medal. In a variant of Aesop's The Boy Who Cried Wolf, Samantha romanticizes her life, pretending that Bangs can talk and that her mother was a mermaid. When a neighboring boy, Thomas, believes her and goes to search for the mermaid, Bangs follow him; they are caught in a seastorm and lost. They return safely, and Sam learns the folly of spreading "moonshine," or nonsense.
Behemoth	The Master and Margarita	Mikhail Bulgakov	An abnormally large black cat who walks on his hind legs and carries a pistol. Being a member of the Devil's entourage, he is wicked and devious. He has a penchant for chess, vodka, and pickled mushrooms.
Bombalurina	Old Possum's Book of Practical Cats	T. S. Eliot	A flirtatious red Queen with a white chest and black spots and marks.
Borregad	Lyrec	Gregory Frost	Borregad and Lyrec are of an energy-based race who can shapeshift. When they hunt their archenemy into another world, Lyrec takes human shape, but Borregad has only enough strength to take the form of a cat. Borregad, a Jester figure, finds a variant of Guinness stout to cheer himself in this fantasy world.
Bubastis	Watchmen	Alan Moore	A genetically altered red lynx with stripes belonging to Ozymandias.
Bustopher Jones	Old Possum's Book of Practical Cats	T. S. Eliot	A parody of an Edwardian gentleman of leisure and is described as the St. James's Street cat, a regular visitor to many gentlemen's clubs in the area, including Drones, Blimp's, and The Tomb. He is also extremely obese.
Buttercup	"The Hunger Games Trilogy"	Suzanne Collins	Primrose's cat, hated by main human character Katniss.
Buzzie	The Drugstore Cat	Ann Petry	A Manx kitten who learns about patience and self restraint.
Captain Wow	"The Game of Rat and Dragon"	Cordwainer Smith	A telepathic tom cat who works happily alongside humans to fight outer space monsters known as Dragons, Captain Wow perceives them as rats and is a successful slayer of these invaders.
Carbonel	Carbonel: the King of the Cats	Barbara Sleigh	Carbonel: the King of the Cats is the first of a three-part series about this royal cat, all published between 1955 and 1978. (Reprinted versions have different titles: Carbonel: the King of the Cats, Carbonel: the King of Cats, Carbonel: the Prince of Cats, and so on.) Carbonel's feline subjects miss him after the witch Mrs. Cantrip abducted him. Unfortunately, he cannot return to his throne until the enslavement spell that Mrs. Cantrip cast on him is undone. He is helped by the human children Rosemary and John. Carbonel is depicted as a black cat, as shown by the book cover illustrations of a wide variety of reprints. Library Journal called it "A must for all libraries." New York Journal-American wrote, "A truly bewitching story reminiscent of Alice in Wonderland," and The Horn Book Magazine enthused, "Magic and everyday life blend smoothly in this highly enjoyable fantasy, perfect for reading aloud."
Cat	Breakfast at Tiffany's	Truman Capote	Pet of Holly Golightly.
Cat	It's Like This, Cat	Emily Cheney Neville	A stray cat that 14-year-old Dave Mitchell adopts as a pet and confidant. Winner of the 1964 Newbery Medal.
The Cat in the Hat	The Cat in the Hat	Dr. Seuss	A mischievous anthropomorphic feline from Dr. Seuss's book of the same name.
Cat Morgan	Old Possum's Book of Practical Cats	T. S. Eliot	Retired and works as a doorman at the book publishers Faber and Faber. He is a gruff but likeable character.
Chairman Mao	Valis	Phillip K. Dick	Gloria Knudson's cat
Cheshire Cat	Alice's Adventures in Wonderland	Lewis Carroll	Sometimes raises philosophical points that annoy or baffle Alice. It does, however, appear to cheer her up when it turns up suddenly at the Queen of Hearts' croquet lawn, and when sentenced to death baffles everyone by having made its head appear without its body, sparking a massive argument between the executioner and the King and Queen of Hearts about whether something that does not have a body can indeed be beheaded.
Chibi	The Guest Cat	Takashi Hiraide	Chibi is a stray cat that is quickly adopted by a neighboring family, though she makes regular visits to the couple, much to their delight.
"Church" (Winston Churchill)	Pet Sematary	Stephen King	This unfortunate cat is killed by a truck, buried in the ancient burial ground of the title, then returns home, in a manner reminiscent of the dead son in the horror story "The Monkey's Paw".
C'mell	"Alpha Ralpha Boulevard" and "The Ballad of Lost C'Mell"	Cordwainer Smith	C'mell is an uplifted Persian cat with reddish fur who looks, in these stories, like a red-headed woman with discreet (and discrete) feline features. She is the heroine of both stories, being a far-future cat/woman with psychic powers including telepathy. She courageously helps her society, both in gaining more rights for "underpeople" (animals given intellect, speech, and physical make-overs) such as herself and in saving the lives of humans. She appears in only two short stories but remains "the most enduringly popular cat in science fiction and fantasy."
Conrad	The Cat Who Caught A Killer	L.T. Shearer	Conrad is a male calico cat who talks and helps Lulu Lewis, his chosen human who is a retired police officer and lives on a canal boat, to solve murders.
Coricopat	Old Possum's Book of Practical Cats	T. S. Eliot	Male twin to Tantomile. Coricopat and Tantomile are often portrayed as psychic cats, as they sense the presence of danger before it becomes apparent to the other characters.
Crookshanks	Harry Potter and the Prisoner of Azkaban	J.K. Rowling	The pet cat of Hermione Granger. He is described as having a "squashed face," which was inspired by a real cat Rowling once saw, which she said looked like it had run face first into a brick wall; most likely a Persian. Hermione buys Crookshanks from a shop in Diagon Alley out of sympathy, as nobody wants him because of his behaviour and his squashed looking-face. Rowling has confirmed that Crookshanks is half Kneazle, an intelligent, cat-like creature who can detect when they are around untrustworthy people, explaining his higher than normal intelligence and stature.
Demeter	Old Possum's Book of Practical Cats	T. S. Eliot	Demeter is black and gold with a few patches of white and red or orange (and she wears gloves instead of arm warmers, giving her a more elegant touch.) She is the cat who unmasks Macavity when he tries to disguise as Old Deuteronomy.
Dinah	Alice's Adventures in Wonderland	Lewis Carroll	Alice's pet kitten in Alice's Adventures in Wonderland. In Through the Looking-Glass, she is an adult with kittens of her own (Kitty and Snowdrop).
Djibi	Djibi, the Kitten	Felix Salten	An independent cat who survives a drowning attempt and chooses for herself where to live.
Donut	Dungeon Crawler Carl	Matt Dinniman	A female tortoiseshell Persian and multi-award-winning show cat who accompanies the titular Carl throughout the series.
Dragon	Mrs. Frisby and the Rats of NIMH	Robert C. O'Brien	The farmer's cat who killed Mrs. Frisby's husband.
Electra	Old Possum's Book of Practical Cats	T. S. Eliot	One of the youngest female kittens in the tribe of Jellicle cats. Like many of the other young feline characters, she is in awe of the Rum Tum Tugger, a flirtatious roguish male main character.
Faithful	The Song of the Lioness series	Tamora Pierce	Magical cat who is a loyal companion to main character Alanna starting in book 2.
Fiddle	Charmed Life	Diana Wynne Jones	Gwendolen used one of Cat's lives to turn his fiddle into a cat named Fiddle.
Findus	Pettson and Findus	Sven Nordqvist	A cat who dresses up and talks with his old Swedish farmer, Pettson.
Firestar	Warriors: Into the Wild	Erin Hunter	The main character for the first arc of Warriors books (the "Original Series") as well as a major supporting character for the subsequent arcs, he is a flame-colored tom with deep green eyes.
Francis	Felidae	Akif Pirinçci	In this 1989 German-language mystery, which has been translated into 17 languages and became a worldwide best-seller, Francis ("a wise-ass of a cat and new to the town"), investigates the murders of several cats. Publishers Weekly wrote, "A clever, offbeat thriller in which the sleuth and most of the other main characters are cats, this ... won Germany's prize for best crime novel of the year in 1990. As an allegory on Germany's Nazi past, it is facile and ambivalent. The detective/narrator, Francis, an irrepressibly curious house cat, deduces that whoever is murdering the neighborhood tabbies has a warped mind and is attempting to breed a 'super race' of felines." Felidae was adapted into a 1994 German animated neo-noir film directed by Michael Schaack and starring Ulrich Tukur as Francis.
Fritti Tailchaser	Tailchaser's Song	Tad Williams	Tailchaser joins with friends Pouncequick and Roofshadow on an epic quest.
Ginger	The Tale of Ginger and Pickles	Beatrix Potter	A yellow tomcat who ran a shop with his partner Pickles, a terrier.
Ginger	The Last Battle	C. S. Lewis	A talking cat of Narnia, he is a four-legged member of the triumvirate who cause civil war and real terror among his compatriots. Ginger lies at every opportunity ("Aslan would want you to do this!"). His co-leaders are Rishda Tarkaan, Calormene captain leading the battle against Narnia with the sole motive of bellicosity, and Shift, a greedy ape who seeks power to sate his gluttony. Ginger is finally punished for his evil deeds by having his ability to speak removed and being banned from Aslan's Country.
Gon	The Cat's Elopement	Andrew Lang (translator)	Original German by David Brauns. A handsome tom who saves his beloved Koma.
Graymalkin	Macbeth	William Shakespeare	A gray cat. The first witch's familiar. In Act I, Scene I the witches plan their next meeting - with Macbeth - "When the hurlyburly's done. When the battle's lost and won." Before the exit, the first witch calls out "I come, Graymalkin!"
Great Rumpus Cat	Old Possum's Book of Practical Cats	T. S. Eliot	A hero in the world of the book and the musical.
Greebo	Discworld	Terry Pratchett	A foul-tempered, one-eyed grey tomcat whose owner, Nanny Ogg, insists against all the evidence that he is a sweet, harmless kitten. In the course of the books, he has killed two vampires, eating at least one of them in the novel Witches Abroad: "The bat squirmed under his claw. It seemed to Greebo's small cat brain that it was trying to change its shape, and he wasn't having any of that from a mouse with wings on."
Griddlebone	Old Possum's Book of Practical Cats	T. S. Eliot	Companion to Mungojerrie, a white fluffy Persian queen who first appears in the poem Growltiger's Last Stand. She inadvertently leads to the demise of her suitor, the dreaded Growltiger, at the hands (paws) of a gang of Siamese cats.
Growltiger	Old Possum's Book of Practical Cats	T. S. Eliot	A pirate cat.
Gummitch	Space-Time for Springers	Fritz Leiber	As Fritz Leiber, a cat-lover, describes him, "Gummitch was a superkitten, as he knew very well, with an I.Q. of about 160. Of course, he didn't talk. But everybody knows that I.Q. tests based on language ability are very one-sided. Besides, he would talk as soon as they started setting a place for him at table and pouring him coffee." Gummitch is unable to prove himself by coffee; he proves himself by saving a life in his household.
Harry Cat	The Cricket in Times Square	George Selden	Friend and guide to New York City for Tucker Mouse and Chester Cricket. The novel was a 1961 Newbery Honor Book.
Jellylorum	Old Possum's Book of Practical Cats	T. S. Eliot	
Jennie	Jennie	Paul Gallico	A young boy named Peter is transformed into a cat after an accident, and is taken in by Jennie and taught the ways of cats.
Jennyanydots	Old Possum's Book of Practical Cats	T. S. Eliot	An old cat who lies around the house all day, but at night, teaches the rats, mice, and cockroaches to be good.
Josie	SCP-529 - Josie the Half Cat	Various	A grey tabby cat designated SCP-529 by the SCP Foundation, whose rear half is invisible and intangible. Josie moves normally despite her absent half. Character was the mascot for the SCP Series.
Jupiter	The Deptford Mice	Robin Jarvis	A bloated, evil ginger tabby worshipped as a living god by sewer rats. He dwells in a dark chamber and no one has ever seen any more of him than his blazing red eyes, so his rodent followers are unaware of the true feline nature of their deity.
Khat	Midnite	Randolph Stow	He is a talking Siamese cat who persuades Captain Midnite to become a bushranger and formulates his plans.
Kitsa	The Indian in the Cupboard	Lynne Reid Banks	She is a housecat who acts as an occasional antagonist, frightening and hunting Omri's animated toy Indian. Kitsa is black and white, with green eyes, noted for her independence and disobedience.
Kitty	Bad Kitty	Nick Bruel	She is a housecat who wreaks havoc around her owner's home when she is in a bad mood, hence the name. She has black fur and a white tuft of fur on her chest.
Koko	The Cat Who...	Lilian Jackson Braun	The nickname of Kao K'o-Kung, one of two cats who help detective Jim Qwilleran solve cases in the series.
Koma	The Cat's Elopement	Andrew Lang (translator)	Original German by David Brauns. A lovely cat who is the beloved of Gon.
Lady May	"The Game of Rat and Dragon"	Cordwainer Smith	A telepathic cat who works happily alongside humans to fight outer space monsters known as Dragons, she perceives them as rats and is a successful slayer of these invaders. Her human partner, Underhill, is in love with her, knowing that no human female mind could ever equal the Lady's.
Leonardo	"Me and My Cat?"	Satoshi Kitamura	A cat who switches with his companion, a boy called Nicholas.
Liszt	"Edward the Conqueror"	Roald Dahl	A woman believes a stray cat who appreciates her piano music is a reincarnation of Franz Liszt, to the disgust of her cat-hating husband.
Macavity	Old Possum's Book of Practical Cats	T. S. Eliot	A devilish cat. Part of the poem about him says, "Macavity, Macavity, there's no one like Macavity, For he's a fiend in feline shape, a monster of depravity".
Maisie MacKenzie	Maisie Comes to Morningside	Aileen Paterson	An anthropomorphic cat who lives in Morningside, Edinburgh, Maisie wears a kilt and her adventures have taken her from Glasgow to New York to Brazil and even climbing in the Himalayas. Her feline friends are Professor Mackenzie and Mrs McKitty. Maisie is featured in over 20 books, and has a line of soft toys; the books have been adapted for a television series, with dubbing by Scottish comedian Stanley Baxter.
Maurice	The Amazing Maurice and his Educated Rodents	Terry Pratchett	The eponymous fast-talking confidence trickster cat who operates a 'pied-piper' scam in the Discworld series of books - organising teams of rats to infest a town and then rapidly withdraw after payment to a 'tame' human.
Mehitabel	Archy and Mehitabel	Don Marquis	An alley cat who is the best friend of the cockroach Archy. Drawn in a series of newspaper comics, she is "a toujours gai" ("always in a good mood") old dame with the soul of Cleopatra." A song, "Toujours Gai," was written for Mehitabel in the 1971 animated musical comedy film Shinbone Alley. It was later covered by Eartha Kitt on her CD album Purr-fect: Greatest Hits.
Mickey	Barbary	Vonda McIntyre	A cat owned by Barbary, a twelve-year-old girl, that travels with her to live on a space station.
Midnight Louie	Crystal Days	Carole Nelson Douglas	20 lb (9 kg) tomcat companion to (and fellow investigator with) amateur sleuth Temple Barr, occasionally assisted by his sire 3 O'Clock Louie, his Ma Barker and her 24th Street gang, and his kit Midnight Louise.
Mikesch	Kater Mikesch	Josef Lada	A tomcat whose owner teaches him to speak.
Minoes	Minoes	Annie M. G. Schmidt	A cat who gets transformed into a human by a chemical accident.
Miss Moppet	The Story of Miss Moppet	Beatrix Potter	One of Tabitha Twitchit's daughters.
Mister	The Dresden Files	Jim Butcher	A bob-tailed grey tomcat belonging to the wizard Harry Dresden. He is often used as a vessel for Bob (a spirit of intellect) to inhabit on intelligence missions.
Mittens	The Tale of Tom Kitten	Beatrix Potter	One of Tabitha Twitchit's daughters.
Mr. Mistoffelees	Old Possum's Book of Practical Cats	T. S. Eliot	An aloof magician cat who can perform a variety of magic tricks such as pulling kittens from a hat and being heard in places where he is not.
Mr. Pusskins	Mr. Pusskins	Sam Lloyd	A pampered orange tomcat.
Mrs. Norris	Harry Potter series	J. K. Rowling	The pet cat of Hogwarts caretaker Argus Filch. She patrols the corridors of the school looking for students skipping class, often foreshadowing the appearance of Mr. Filch himself. J. K. Rowling named the character after Mrs. Norris from Jane Austen's 1814 novel Mansfield Park.
Mog	Meg and Mog	Helen Nicoll	Faithful friend of Meg the witch.
Mog	Mog the Forgetful Cat	Judith Kerr	Faithful pet of the Thomas family.
Mogget	Sabriel	Garth Nix	A mysterious white cat that serves the Abhorsen, who may be more than he appears.
Moxie	The Subtle Knife	Philip Pullman	Will's cat who leads him through the window to Cittàgazze, where he meets Lyra. Later, Will's daemon settles as a cat.
Mungojerrie	Old Possum's Book of Practical Cats	T. S. Eliot	Part of a duo with Rumpleteazer, a couple of petty thieves with a reputation for destruction.
Munkustrap	Old Possum's Book of Practical Cats	T. S. Eliot	
Murr	The Life and Opinions of the Tomcat Murr	E. T. A. Hoffmann	
Nigger Man	The Rats in the Walls	H. P. Lovecraft	Plays a pivotal role.
Noboru Wataya	The Wind Up Bird Chronicle	Haruki Murakami	Later renamed Mackerel.
Old Deuteronomy	Old Possum's Book of Practical Cats	T. S. Eliot	A very old and wise cat that can be found resting in all sorts of places throughout town.
Oliver	Oliver in the Garden	Margaret Beames	
Orlando	A Camping Holiday	Kathleen Hale	The eponymous hero.
Pangur Bán	"The Monk and His Cat"	Attributed to Sedulius Scottus; translated by W. H. Auden and others	Set to music by Samuel Barber and others. The cat in this 9th-century Irish monastic poem is described as a happy mouser, whose simple enjoyment of success in the hunt is likened to that of the author, a monk, when he learns something new in his studies.
Peter	"The Smile of the Sphinx"	William F. Temple	This cat is thought, by the narrator, to be an extraordinarily stupid cat "who could never learn the simplest of tricks"; in fact, Peter is extraordinarily brilliant. He is part of a race of Felidae who originally lived on the Moon and who came to Earth, ages ago, to enjoy being spoiled by the Egyptians. This science fiction tale explains why dogs howl at the Moon, why the Great Sphinx of Giza has its shape, and even why the Moon has craters.
Petronius the Arbiter (Pete)	The Door into Summer	Robert A. Heinlein	The smart, loving cat of protagonist Daniel Boone Davis, who occasionally carries him in a carrying-bag and gives him saucers of ginger ale to drink. Dan calls him Petronius the Arbiter because he thinks that Pete is a good arbiter (judge) of personality. If Pete dislikes someone, Dan will distrust that person; Pete has always been proved right.
Pitty Sing	"A Good Man Is Hard to Find"	Flannery O'Connor	The grandmother's cat. She brings him on their ill-fated trip against her son's wishes "because he would miss her too much and she was afraid he might brush against one of the gas burners and accidentally asphyxiate himself." She jostles the cat, hidden in a basket, causing him to jump onto the shoulder of Bailey, her son, which results in the family car crashing.
Pixel	The Cat Who Walks Through Walls	Robert A. Heinlein	The title character of the book, who has an inexplicable tendency to be wherever the narrator happens to be. In one scene Pixel does, in fact, walk through a wall, and it is explained that Pixel is too young to know that such behavior is impossible.
Pluto	The Black Cat	Edgar Allan Poe	Pluto is the narrator's cat. After becoming an alcoholic he starts abusing the cat, then trying unsuccessfully to kill it. When his wife intervenes in one incident he kills her instead then bricks the body up in a wall. The narrator is caught when the police come and hear sounds behind the wall, where the narrator accidentally entombed the still-living cat along with its mistress.
Poppy	Poppy Cat	Lara Jones	Poppy Cat, a young neckerchief-wearing kitten who is the protagonist of the series and the leader of her teammates, Alma, Zuzu, Owl and Mo. She takes them on big extraordinary adventures to faraway places by every vehicle they need, but they have to stay away from Egbert, because he is not nice to them.
Princess Arjumand, aka 'Dearum JuJu'	To Say Nothing of the Dog	Connie Willis	Princess Arjumand is the beloved pet of Tocelyn 'Tossie' Mering in the 19th century whose great-granddaughter in the 21st century will control a very large endowment that the time travel faculty of Oxford greatly needs. Princess Arjumand is brought into the future to save her from drowning and sets off the plot of the book when the hero is tasked with returning her to her own time. Is particularly fond of goldfish.
Ralph	Rotten Ralph	Jack Gantos	A mischievous red cat who enjoys playing mean, practical jokes on his family.
Ribby	The Tale of the Pie and the Patty-Pan	Beatrix Potter	A cat with a love for mouse pie, a good friend of the dog Duchess and cousin to Tabitha.
Rroû	Rroû	Maurice Genevoix	In the film adaptation, the gray tabby kitten is born in an attic, sees his mother fall to her death, is taken in by a girl, lost in the woods, injured, recovers, and is left to live in the woods with a white cat. The novel Rroû by Maurice Genevoix was published in 1931 and republished in 2023 upon the release of the film adaptation Mon chat et moi, la grande aventure de Rroû (My Cat and I, the Great Adventure of Rroû). Where subtitled in English in English-speaking countries, the cat’s name is Lou, and the film is called A Cat’s Life. The film is rated PG for fear, death, violence, and language.
Rum Tum Tugger	Old Possum's Book of Practical Cats	T. S. Eliot	A fickle cat that brings trouble with his indecisiveness.
Rumpelteazer	Old Possum's Book of Practical Cats	T. S. Eliot	Part of a duo with Mungojerrie, a couple of petty thieves with a reputation for destruction.
Sagwa	Sagwa, the Chinese Siamese Cat	Amy Tan	A kitten who gained her Siamese markings by accident. She is capable of writing in Chinese with her tail.
Sampson	The Church Mice series	Graham Oakley	A cat that lives at a church and looks after mice.
Scarface Claw	Hairy Maclary from Donaldson's Dairy and various sequels	Lynley Dodd	A tough cat who scares Hairy Maclary and his canine companions, and even scares himself.
Simpkin	The Tailor of Gloucester	Beatrix Potter	The Tailor's pet cat who fetches an essential cherry-coloured silk twist, but angrily hides it after he finds the tailor released his captive mice. After a change of heart, he gives back the twist.
Skimbleshanks	Old Possum's Book of Practical Cats	T. S. Eliot	A cat working on the train to Glasgow and without him, the train cannot go.
Slinky Malinki	Slinky Malinki	Lynley Dodd	The stalking and lurking adventurous cat who is a common cat during the day but becomes a thief as night falls.
Small Bob	House of Hades	Rick Riordan	Small Bob is Bob, AKA Iapetuse's skeleton cat in Tartarus. He is a dead cat, only made from bones. His image flickers, making him seem different at times.
Sprockets	Mission to Universe	Gordon R. Dickson	Sprockets is a stowaway feral kitten who becomes spaceship mascot. The crew members superstitiously believe that his finally learning to purr will portend success in their search for an inhabitable planet.
Squire Gingivere	Mossflower	Brian Jacques	Squire Julian Gingivere was odd among cats in the fact that he was a vegetarian. He lived with the owl Captain Snow, but the owl's appetite for meat, his bad table manners and their conflicting personalities led to a disagreement and then separation.
Stew-Cat, Blue-Cat and Clue-Cat	The Thief of Always	Clive Barker	These three cats are the friendly familiars of the magical Holiday House.
Tab	Watership Down	Richard Adams	Tab is one of a gang of talking cats who live at Nuthanger Farm. When the protagonist rabbits raid the farm, the cats prove to be bold, dangerous enemies and are subdued only by the wits of Hazel and Blackberry, the brawny courage of Bigwig, and the speed of Dandelion. On his next trip to the farm, Hazel is assaulted by the green-eyed Tab, but the little girl of the farm saves Hazel.
Tabby McTat	Tabby McTat	Julia Donaldson	The titular character of the children's book which was later adapted into an animated short film on the BBC. He sings alongside a busker named Fred.
Tabitha Twitchit	The Tale of Tom Kitten	Beatrix Potter	The mother of three kittens Miss Moppet, Mittens and Tom Kitten, who tries hard to cope with their mischievous behaviour.
Tao	The Incredible Journey	Sheila Burnford	A Siamese cat who accompanies Luath, a Labrador Retriever, and Bodger, a Bull Terrier, on a 300-mile journey through the Canadian wilderness to rejoin their human family.
Thomas Gray	Thomas Gray: Philosopher Cat	Philip J. Davis	A female cat living in Pembroke College, Cambridge. She assists a historian of science in his work.
Thomasina	Thomasina, the Cat Who Thought She Was God	Paul Gallico	A ginger cat that seemingly returns from the dead.
Tiddles	Ginger and the Mystery Visitor	Charlotte Voake	A cat that makes itself at home at Ginger and Kitten's house.
Tobermory	"Tobermory" (in The Chronicles of Clovis)	H. H. Munro	In a short story by Saki, a cat is taught to talk, but knows too many personal facts about people and is all too willing to talk about them. He is taught by mild-mannered Cornelius Appin, who calls Tobermory "a Beyond-cat of extraordinary intelligence". When Tobermory embarrasses everyone present by proving to be a consummate gossip, his owner attempts to poison him. Saki's biographer comments, "The cat eludes the strychnine left out for him and falls instead in combat with a big yellow tom from the rectory. Not a hero's death but an honorable one, and comedy depends heavily on a sense of honor."
Tom Kitten	The Tale of Tom Kitten	Beatrix Potter	A curious but disobedient kitten in the children's stories "The Tale of Tom Kitten" and "The Roly Poly Pudding" by Beatrix Potter.
Trillion the Three-Headed Lion	Beast Quest		Trillion is a large, three-headed lion that cannot swim. He lives in the Central Plains. Tom, with the help of Tagus, defeats Trillion, and Tom goes through the Lion's Gate into Gorgonia, home of the wizard Malvel.
Tufty	Diary of a Killer Cat	Ann Fine	A much maligned and misunderstood cat who gets blamed for the disappearance of a pet rabbit (amongst other misdemeanours).
Ungatt Trunn	Lord Brocktree	Brian Jacques	An evil wildcat who conquers the mountain stronghold Salamandastron. But the good badger Brocktree comes to regain the mountain.
Yoko	Yoko	Rosemary Wells	Yoko is a Japanese-American kitten who is getting ready for her first day of school. Unfortunately, her first day at school goes badly when she gets teased by the other students for her lunch: sushi.
Yum Yum	The Cat Who...	Lilian Jackson Braun	One of two cats who help detective Jim Qwilleran solve cases in the series.
Zoppino	Gelsomino in the Country of Liars	Gianni Rodari	A red kitty drawn on the wall by a girl named Romoletta and miraculously revived. Gelsomino's best friend.

== Unnamed ==
Character	Earliest Appearance	Notes
Black kitten who eats human flesh	Cat's Eyes by Lee Jordan	A mild horror story in which a black kitten becomes an abnormally large black cat, who haunts the isolated house of the heroine, Rachel. In its kittenhood, it had led the other thirty cats of Old Miss Mulgrave to dine on her when she died in her home and the cats were starving. Rachel fears it is stalking her and her baby, with reason: "It was starving.... Now it would eat anything."
The Cat in the Picture	"The Cat in the Picture" by Wright Morris	In this macabre tale originally published in a 1958 issue of Esquire, a black cat slowly displaces a retired captain from his bed, his wife, and his home. The surprise ending is worthy of Alfred Hitchcock Presents. More than one commentator compared the writing with Poe's.
Mr. Sneaze's cat	"I Am a Cat" by Natsume Sōseki	The supercilious, feline narrator describes the lives of an assortment of middle-class Japanese people. The name of the cat is not given.
Suzdal's super-cats	"The Crime and the Glory of Commander Suzdal" by Cordwainer Smith	Commander Suzdal saves a colonial planet by imprinting a genetic message on cat cells, which instructs them to train themselves and to be ready to fight in the time of his need, then sends them back in time to a nearby moon. "A subjective second later, the cat-people save Suzdal" from an overwhelming alien attack.
Various far-future cats	"Puss in Boots" by Ronald Anthony Cross	This science fiction story describes a world full of far-future cats on a planet where "cats were the closest thing to a religion that they had" and where cats "wandered freely and slept wherever they chose. There were huge communal cat boxes everywhere...filled with some form of brightly colored pellets, which automatically emptied and were refilled with more of the same stuff." The fact that cats are no longer fed actual meat is a clue to the mystery in the story, about whether men are any longer real men.

== See also ==
- List of fictional cats
- List of individual cats
