= Hairy Maclary Scattercat =

1985 children's book by Lynley Dodd

- Author: Lynley Dodd
- Language: English
- Series: Hairy Maclary
- Genre: Children's book
- Publisher: Mallinson Rendel Publishers Limited
- Publication date: 1985
- Publication place: New Zealand
- Pages: 32
- ISBN: 0140505806
- Preceded by: Hairy Maclary's Bone
- Followed by: Hairy Maclary's Caterwaul Caper

Hairy Maclary Scattercat by Lynley Dodd is the third book of the bestselling series Hairy Maclary and Friends.

The book is about Hairy Maclary enjoying bothering, bustling and hustling all the neighbourhood cats, including Slinky Malinki, until he meets Scarface Claw and it's Maclary's turn to be bothered, hustled and bustled.
