= Jana Kolarič =

Slovene author and translator (born 1954)

- Born: 17 September 1954 (age 71); Maribor, Slovenia
- Occupations: Writer, editor, translator

Jana Kolarič (born 17 September 1954) is a Slovene author and translator. She is the author of plays and novels for both children and adults, and has been recognised as an exceptional artist by the Ministry of Culture. She has won a number of literary awards.

== Career ==
Jana Kolarič was born on 17 September 1954 in Maribor, where she attended elementary and secondary school. In 1979 she completed her AGRF (Akademija za Gledališče, Radio, Film) course in Ljubljana with a degree in film and TV directing. She worked in a variety of jobs after completing her studies, including as consultant for educational TV, lecturer in art education, mentor of a drama group, cultural animator, journalist and editor of school books for a publishing house. As of 2010 she was working as a translator of literature, particularly poetry and fairy tales, and by lecturing. She is married and the mother of four children.

== Literary activity ==
Jana Kolarič has regularly published poems and plays. In 1976 she created a successful play for children, Salon Expon. While working for the Tuma publishing house she was responsible for Primadona, a collection of 12 plays with detailed staging instructions adapted to schools. She joined the Slovene Writers' Association (DSP: Društvo slovenskih pisateljev) in January 2004. She received recognition as a leading artist from the Ministry of Culture in October 2004. In 2004 she published a drama for adults, Kdo le so oni?, and in 2005 a collection of puzzles, Ugibanke male, oblecene v šale. Kolarič drew the puzzles in this book, which was designed for children.

Kolarič's debut science fiction novel Izpred kongresa, a satire of Slovene society featuring adults being cloned at a huge clinic, was first published in 2006 with the funding of the Ministry of Culture of the Republic of Slovenia. It received special mention by the jury in a modern Slovene novel competition run by the Mladinska Knjiga publishing house. Kolarič translated two children's picture books for the Miš publishing house: Moja sestra Zala and Kuštravi Slave z Mlekarske pristave. She published a collection of short dramatic scripts Dobro jutro, lutke (2007) for the Genija publishing house. In 2008 she published her second novel, co-authored with Tatjano Kokalj, Draga Alina, draga Brina. As of 2010 her second co-authored novel was ready for publication, Zima z ognjenim šalom.

In a 2009 interview Kolarič noted that the market for Slovene literature was small and it was hard to make money. Most writers had a full-time job, usually in education, and wrote when they had the time. She had to take whatever work was available, including teaching, translating, writing books, editing and sometimes helping stage plays. She felt that the media raised impossible expectations of a woman's role, describing a super-woman with a stylish way of life who is the perfect professional artist, who supports her children, husband and parents, and who is a breadwinner and markets their own books. She felt that women writers had to overcome prejudice against negative views of emotional aspects of their work, labeled as "sentimental", "melodramatic" or "weak". She had won competitions only when she consciously adopted a male style of writing.

== Selected awards ==
Kolarič's radio play Upanje na bogastvo won third prize at the 60th anniversary competition of Trieste Radio Studios. Trieste Radio Studios staged the play in 2007. Her radio play Odiseja 3000 won first prize in the 2007 Radia Slovenija competition, and was staged by Radio Slovenija in 2008. The children's play is about life on different planets and what is new on earth. Her short story Barva marsovskih hlac was selected in the International Board on Books for Young People Slovene section as representative of Slovenia in the March 2009 world youth anthology in India. In 2011 her story Goli goli won third place in a competition organized by Ljubljana's Student Publishing Company. In 2013 Jana Kolaric won the first Literary Death Match competition in Ljubljana, where she read a short story with a tragic and unexpected end about a woman babysitting her niece.

== Publications ==
Books published by Kolarič include:

- Jana Kolarič (1981), Salon Expon (children's play), ZKOS
- Jana Kolarič (2002), Erazem in potepuh, Zbirka Primadona, Založba Tuma Published with Astrid Lindgren's Pika
- Jana Kolarič (2003), Ostržek in roparja, Ostržkove morske pustolovščine, Zbirka Primadona, Založba Tuma, ISBN 9616470116
- Jana Kolarič (2004), Kdo le so oni?, foreword by Bojan Martinec, self published, ISBN 9612367191 Published with the financial support of the Ministry of Culture of the Republic of Slovenia
- Jana Kolarič (2005), Martin Krpan, Ljubljana: Založba Tuma, ISBN 9616470647
- Jana Kolarič (2005), Ugibanke male, oblečene v šale (collection of puzzles), illustrated by Alojz Zorman Fojž, Založba Miš, ISBN 9616506587
- Jana Kolarič (2006), Izpred kongresa, Mladinska Knjiga, ISBN 8611173724
- Jana Kolarič; Tilka Jamnik (2007), Dobro jutro, lutke, Genija, ISBN 978-9616576161
- Tatjano Kokalj; Jana Kolarič (2008), Draga Alina, draga Brina, Mladinska Knjiga, ISBN 978-9610104155
- Jana Kolarič (2009), Lutke iz Ljubimora, Ljubljana: Založniški atelje Blodnjak, ISBN 9789616400886
- Tatjana Kokalj; Jana Kolarič (2011), Zima z ognjenim šalom, Založba: Mladika Trst, ISBN 9788873421641

Translations by Kolarič include:

- Lynley Dodd (2005), Kuštravi Slave z mlekarske pristave (Hairy Maclary from Donaldson's Dairy), translated by Jana Kolarič, Miš
- Gillian Johnson (2005), Moja sestra Zala (My Sister Gracie), translated by Jana Kolarič, ISBN 961-6506-41-2
- Michael Schober (2006), Jaz bila bi divja ovčka (Klip-klap knjiga), translated by Jana Kolarič, Kres, ISBN 86-7823-400-8

== Sources ==
- Alen Jelen (24 April 2016), Jana Kolarič: Odiseja 3000 /na prvem programu/ (in Slovenian), RTV Slovenija
- Alenka Laptoš (11 May 2010), Obisk pisateljice Jane Kolarič (in Slovenian), I. osnovna šola Celje
- Literarni večer z Jano Kolarič (in Slovenian), Kulturno društvo Mariborska literarna družba, 25 February 2010
- Ljubljana, Ep. 1, Literary Death Match, 28 March 2013
- Miklavčič, Alja, Jana Kolarič (in Slovenian), Društvo slovenskih pisateljev
- Mladinska knjiga prenovila zbirko (in Slovenian), Ljubljana: MMC RTV SLO, 5 April 2006
- Rojstni dan Knjižnega Kluba (in Slovenian), Ljubljana: MMC RTV SLO, 13 May 2004
- Simpozij: Radijska adaptacija mladinske književnosti. Oko besede 2009, Mariborske knjižnice, 25 September 2009
- Slovinská dramatička, poetka a prozaička Jana KOLARIČ odpovedá v ankete (in Slovenian), Literárne informačné centrum, 2009
- "Starc – zmagovalec lokalnega proznega mnogoboja", Dolenjski List (in Slovenian), 3 February 2011, ISSN 1581-0550
