= Ann Mallinson =

New Zealand children's book publisher

Ann Mallinson ONZM QSM
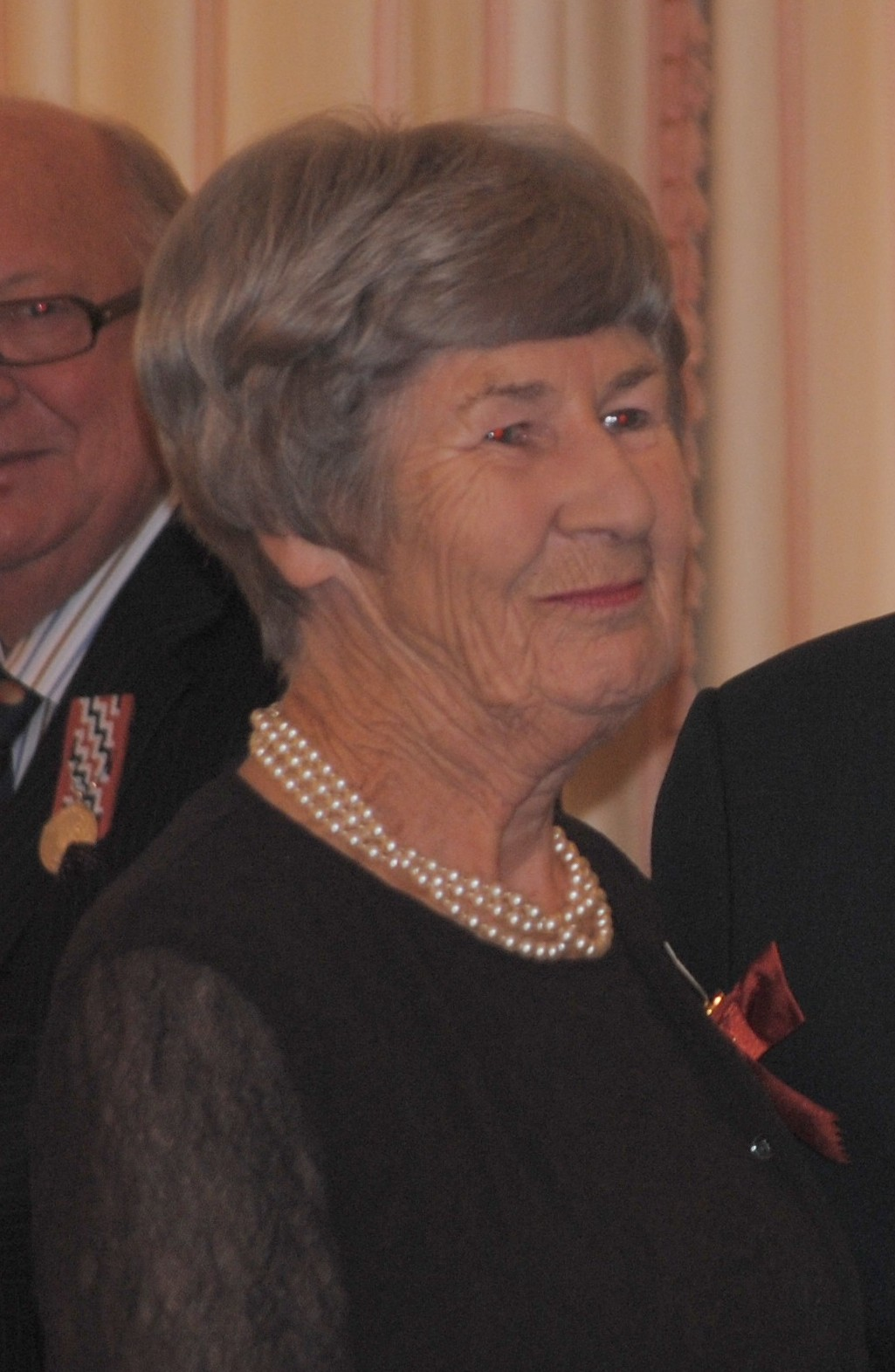
- Mallinson at her investiture in April 2010
- Born: Elizabeth Ann Mallinson; 10 September 1934 (age 91); London, England
- Occupation: Children's book publisher
- Employer: Mallinson Rendel
- Spouse: David Rendel
- Awards: Margaret Mahy Award (1997)

Elizabeth Ann Mallinson ONZM QSM (born 10 September 1934) is a New Zealand children's book publisher and co-founder of Mallinson Rendel, best known for Lynley Dodd's Hairy Maclary series.

== Early life ==
Mallinson was born in London on 10 September 1934. Her mother and stepfather had moved to New Zealand, where she visited briefly.

== Career ==
Back in London she worked for two academic journals. Her career in New Zealand began at Sweet & Maxwell as editorial assistant. From there she went to Associated Book Publishers (NZ), rising to publishing director in 1972. Mallinson became a naturalised New Zealand citizen in 1977.

In 1980 she and her husband David Rendel founded Mallinson Rendel, a company focussing on publishing books for children. Mallinson announced the sale of the company to Penguin New Zealand in 2009 on Beattie's Book Blog.

She wrote Recollections of Five Festivals in which she described her work as chair and director of Wellington Writers' and Readers' Week between 1984 and 1994.

Mallinson was presented with the 1997 Margaret Mahy Award for her contribution to children's literature and gave a lecture titled "From a Trickle to a River". It was included in the Year Book published that year by the New Zealand Children's Book Foundation.

Mallinson was awarded the Queen's Service Medal for public services in the 1990 Queen's Birthday Honours. She was appointed an Officer of the New Zealand Order of Merit in the 2010 New Year Honours, for services to publishing, in particular children's literature.

As of 2019, Mallinson acted as agent for children's author Lynley Dodd. She is a life member of the Publishers Association of New Zealand.

At the 2023 Aotearoa Book Trade Industry Awards, Mallinson received the Lifetime Achievement Award.
