= Hairy Maclary's Bone =

1984 children's book by Lynley Dodd

- Author: Lynley Dodd
- Language: English
- Series: Hairy Maclary
- Genre: Children's book
- Publisher: Mallinson Rendel Publishers Limited
- Publication date: 1984
- Publication place: New Zealand
- ISBN: 0-908606-29-X
- Preceded by: Hairy Maclary From Donaldson’s Dairy
- Followed by: Hairy Maclary Scattercat

Hairy Maclary's Bone first published in 1984, is the second of the popular series of books by New Zealand author Lynley Dodd featuring Hairy Maclary. His adventures are usually in the company of his other dog friends. His arch-enemy is the belligerent soft grey tabby named Scarface Claw.

Written for pre-school children, with rhythmic, rhyming text, it has become a best-selling bedtime storybook in New Zealand and Australia.

In this book, Hairy Maclary is given a tasty bone from the town butcher Samuel Stone and must get back to Donaldson's Dairy with it while fending off his five doggie friends - Hercules Morse the English Mastiff, Muffin McLay the Old English Sheepdog, Bottomley Potts the Dalmatian, Bitzer Maloney the Greyhound and Schnitzel Von Krumm the Dachshund.
