= My Cat Likes to Hide in Boxes =

Children's book

- 2010 Puffin Books edition
- Author: Eve Sutton
- Illustrator: Lynley Dodd
- Language: English
- Genre: Children's book
- Publisher: Puffin Books
- Publication date: 1978-04-27
- Publication place: New Zealand
- Pages: 32
- ISBN: 0-14-050242-4
- OCLC: 12479906

My Cat Likes to Hide in Boxes is a New Zealand children’s book by Eve Sutton and Lynley Dodd, who are cousins by marriage. The book was first published in 1974 and won the 1975 Esther Glen Award.

According to Dodd, the book is based upon the "Dodd family cat, Wooskit, who, like all cats, liked to hide in boxes, supermarket bags, cupboards and hidey-holes of all kinds". The book itself consists of descriptions of other cats from other countries, all followed by the phrase "but my cat likes to hide in boxes".

After the book's publication, Sutton went on to write books for older children. Dodd, however, continued to write for younger children—which eventually led to her famous Hairy Maclary series of children’s books.

The 50th anniversary edition of My Cat Likes to Hide in Boxes was published in February 2023.
