= Ronald Cross =

Ronald Cross may refer to:

- Sir Ronald Cross, 1st Baronet (1896–1968), British politician and diplomat
- Ronald Anthony Cross (1937–2006), American science fiction writer
