= Church mouse =

Church mouse may refer to:

- The Church Mouse, a 1934 film
- The Church Mouse, a 1972 book, first in The Church Mice series

== See also ==
- Mouse
- Poor as a Church Mouse, a 1931 German film
- Robert Thompson (designer), a British furniture maker who used a mouse motif, derived from the phrase
