= Betty Gilderdale Award =

- Date: 1990
- Country: New Zealand
- Hosted by: Storylines
- Reward: NZ$2,000
- Website: Official website

The Betty Gilderdale Award, also known as the Storylines Betty Gilderdale Award, is a New Zealand award given to an individual for outstanding service to children's literature and literacy. Before 2000 the award was known as the Children's Literature Association's Award for Services to Children's Literature. It was renamed in honour of the children's author Betty Gilderdale.

Recipients of the award received a cash prize of $2000 and deliver the Storylines Spring Lecture.

Previous recipients of the award include:

Year	Name	Title of Lecture
1990	Eve Sutton	
1991	Dorothy Butler	
1992	Elsie Locke	
1993	Jo Noble	
1994	Ron Bacon	
1995	No award	
1996	Graham Beattie	A Fortunate Life
1997	Diane Hebley & Gary Hebley	A Goose, a Gander and a Clutch of Eggs
1998	Phyllis Johnston	An Impressionable Age
1999	Betty Gilderdale	The Effects of Post-Modernism on Children’s Literature
2000	No award	
2001	Veda Pickles	Friends and Relatives
2002	Barbara Murison	Tapestries 1931-2002
2003	Jean Bennett	Children’s Literature is a Community Event, and the Dangers of Dragons
2004	Ray Richards	Do You Know the Way to Castor Bay? A Life in Publishing and Children’s Books
2005	John McKenzie	Children’s Literature as an Academic Study: A Perilous Space?
2006	Frances Plumpton	Climbing the Magic Faraway Tree
2007	Kāterina Mataira	Creativity and Expression.
2008	Lois Rout	Anecdotal Meanderings
2009	No award	
2010	Glyn Strange	Getting in Behind
2011	Ruth McIntyre and John McIntyre	
2012	Gerri Judkins	
2013	Trevor Agnew	The Reviewer Reviewed.
2014	Robyn Southam	
2015	Trish Brooking	Past to present: Navigating New Zealand Children’s Literature.
2016	Rosemary Tisdall	A Life of Privilege
2017	Maureen Crisp	
2018	Jeannie Skinner	For the Love of Libraries
2019	Crissi Blair	A Tour of my Bookshelves
2020	Lorraine Orman	Story and Serendipity
2021	Sarah Forster	A changing landscape of 'good' books
2022	Libby Limbrick	In Praise of Storylines – and Reading for Pleasure
2024	Joy Sellen	Discovering Treasure: New Zealand Stories for Young Readers
2025	Bob Docherty	From Page to Imagination: A Life Shaped By Children's Books
