= The Church Mice and the Ring =

1992 picture book by Graham Oakley

- Author: Graham Oakley
- Illustrator: Graham Oakley
- Language: English
- Genre: Picture book
- Published: 25 September 1992
- Publication place: UK
- Pages: 32
- ISBN: 0333539036
- Preceded by: The Diary of a Church Mouse
- Followed by: Humphrey hits the Jackpot

The Church Mice and the Ring is a children's picture book by English writer Graham Oakley. It is the eleventh in the Church Mice series. It chronicles the scrapes of the church mice as they try to find a home for a stray dog, a quest which soon comes to involve an easily lost diamond ring. It was published by Pan Macmillan.

== Plot ==
Humphrey's attempts to point out the hole in the ozone layer are disrupted by the arrival of Percy, a dog who is now living as a stray, having formerly been a Christmas present. After learning that he has nowhere to live, the church mice invite him to live with them until he finds a new home - to the great disgust of Sampson the church cat. The mice initially dismiss his attitude as 'anti-dog talk', but soon come to regret their decision after Percy eats their entire week's cheese supply, leaving them to subsist on the discarded scraps of food which are thrown over the churchyard wall.

The following morning, the mice meet a young girl named Polly, who immediately becomes fond of Percy. Seeking to find Percy a new home as quickly as possible, the mice and Polly decide to introduce him to her wealthy parents who live in a large house nearby. Polly's parents are having a garden party, and the scheme soon goes awry: Percy urinates on the flowerbed, Sampson flirts with a pretty pet cat belonging to Polly's mother and the mice steal food off the guests' plates. They are ordered to leave and to never return. Not to be put off, Humphrey attempts to teach Percy how to be a good dog so that he might win the hearts of Polly's parents. Percy's attempts to do so merely cause even more chaos around the house and furthers their dislike of him.

Humphrey and Arthur then hit upon an idea: they will steal Polly's mother's valuable antique diamond ring and have Percy 'find' it. The two mice (aided by Sampson) successfully swipe the ring during the night and leave it on the pavement for Percy to find. Unfortunately, before Polly's parents reach it, it is picked up by a shady neighbour, who then sells it. Desperate to have Percy off their hands in order to begin eating adequately again, the mice infiltrate the jeweller's shop at night and retrieve the ring, but are promptly arrested by the police.

At the police station, the sergeant is at first willing to let the mice off with a police caution, since 'as they were church mice, they couldn't be that bad', but after he describes their incursion into the jeweller's as 'a foolish prank', Humphrey (whose idea it was) is indignant to hear it described as such, and insults the sergeant, who promptly has the mice locked up. They manage to escape from the cell and hide under the sergeant's helmet, then recover the ring by slowly manoeuvring the helmet across the desktop and over the ring, then back again. The sergeant then puts the helmet on and departs. Outside, Sampson ambushes the sergeant and removes the helmet, letting the mice escape.

The next morning, the mice leave the ring outside the church and again get Percy to 'find' it. Yet before he can do so, the ring is stolen by the jackdaw who lives at the top of the church tower. Sampson and the mice then try to recover it by sending Percy onto the outside of the tower to raid the jackdaw's nest, using the parson's stole as an improvised safety harness. Just after finding the ring, Percy is attacked by the jackdaw and falls off the tower, causing Sampson and the mice (who are holding the other end of the stole) to be pulled off with him. They land safely after becoming caught on a statue in the churchyard. Bowled over by 'a person who'd risk his life for a diamond ring', Polly's mother gladly gives him a home, to the great delight of the mice.
