= Maureen Crisp =

New Zealand teacher, writer and literary blogger

Maureen Anne Crisp is a New Zealand writer, teacher, literary blogger and book awards judge. In 2017, she was awarded the Storylines Betty Gilderdale Award for outstanding service to children's literature and she delivered the Storylines Spring Lecture on 27 November 2017. She lives in Wellington.

== Biography ==
Crisp taught for many years in primary schools in Wellington, before deciding to concentrate on writing, blogging and other literary activities. She has been published by the New Zealand School Journal, Penguin and Marmac Media and was one of the founding authors of the children's writing online competition FABO Story. As chair of the Wellington Children's Book Association, she was convenor of two national conferences for children's writers and illustrators: Spinning Gold in 2009 and Tinderbox in 2015. In 2018, she was one of the judges for the New Zealand Book Awards for Children and Young Adults.

Crisp writes a weekly blog about developments in the writing and publishing world, contributes regularly to the Writer's Island podcast and is a creative writing workshop presenter. She is married with three children, likes writing science fiction, has a keen interest in astronomy and lives in Wellington.

== Honours and awards ==
In 2017, Crisp was awarded the Storylines Betty Gilderdale Award for outstanding service to children's literature. She delivered the Storylines Spring Lecture on Monday 27 November 2017 in Wellington.

== Publications ==
- Bones, illustrated by Robert Calvert (Penguin, 2008; Kiwi Bites series)
- How to Lose a Rock Star (Marmac Media, 2019)
- Circus Quest series
  - The Playbill, ill. Irina Burtseva (Marmac, 2018)
  - Magician’s Moustache, ill. Irina Burtseva (Marmac, 2018)
  - Performing Poodles, ill. Irina Burtseva (Marmac, 2019)
  - Tumbling Town, ill. Irina Burtseva (Marmac, 2020)
