= Hairy Maclary and Friends =

Series of children's books

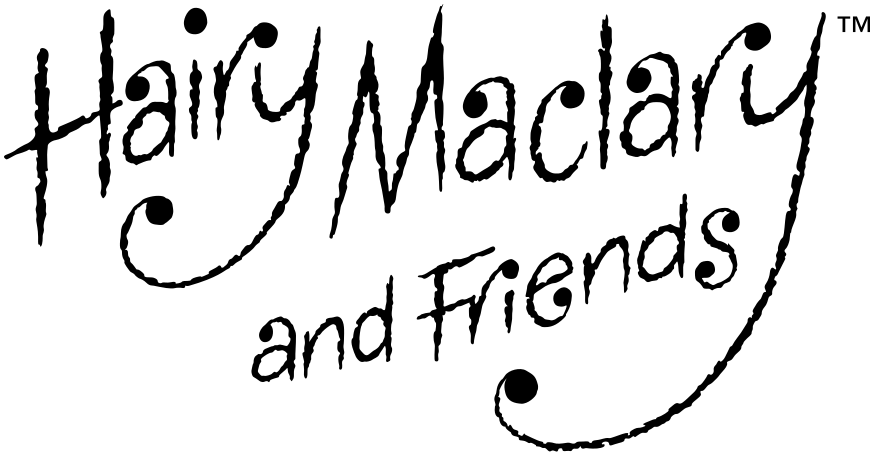
- Hairy Maclary and Friends Logo
- Hairy Maclary from Donaldson's Dairy; Hairy Maclary's Bone; Hairy Maclary Scattercat; Hairy Maclary's Caterwaul Caper; Hairy Maclary's Rumpus at the Vet; Slinky Malinki; Hairy Maclary's Showbusiness; Slinky Malinki Open The Door; Schnitzel von Krumm’s Basketwork; Schnitzel von Krumm Forget-Me-Not; Hairy Maclary, Sit; Slinky Malinki Catflaps; Hairy Maclary and Zachary Quack; Scarface Claw; Schnitzel von Krumm, Dogs Never Climb Trees; Zachary Quack Minimonster; Slinky Malinki's Christmas Crackers; Hairy Maclary's Hat Tricks; Hairy Maclary, Shoo; Slinky Malinki Early Bird; Scarface Claw, Hold Tight
- Author: Lynley Dodd
- Illustrator: Lynley Dodd
- Country: New Zealand
- Language: English
- Genre: Children's books, picture book
- Publisher: Penguin Books
- Published: 1983–present
- Website: https://www.hairymaclary.com

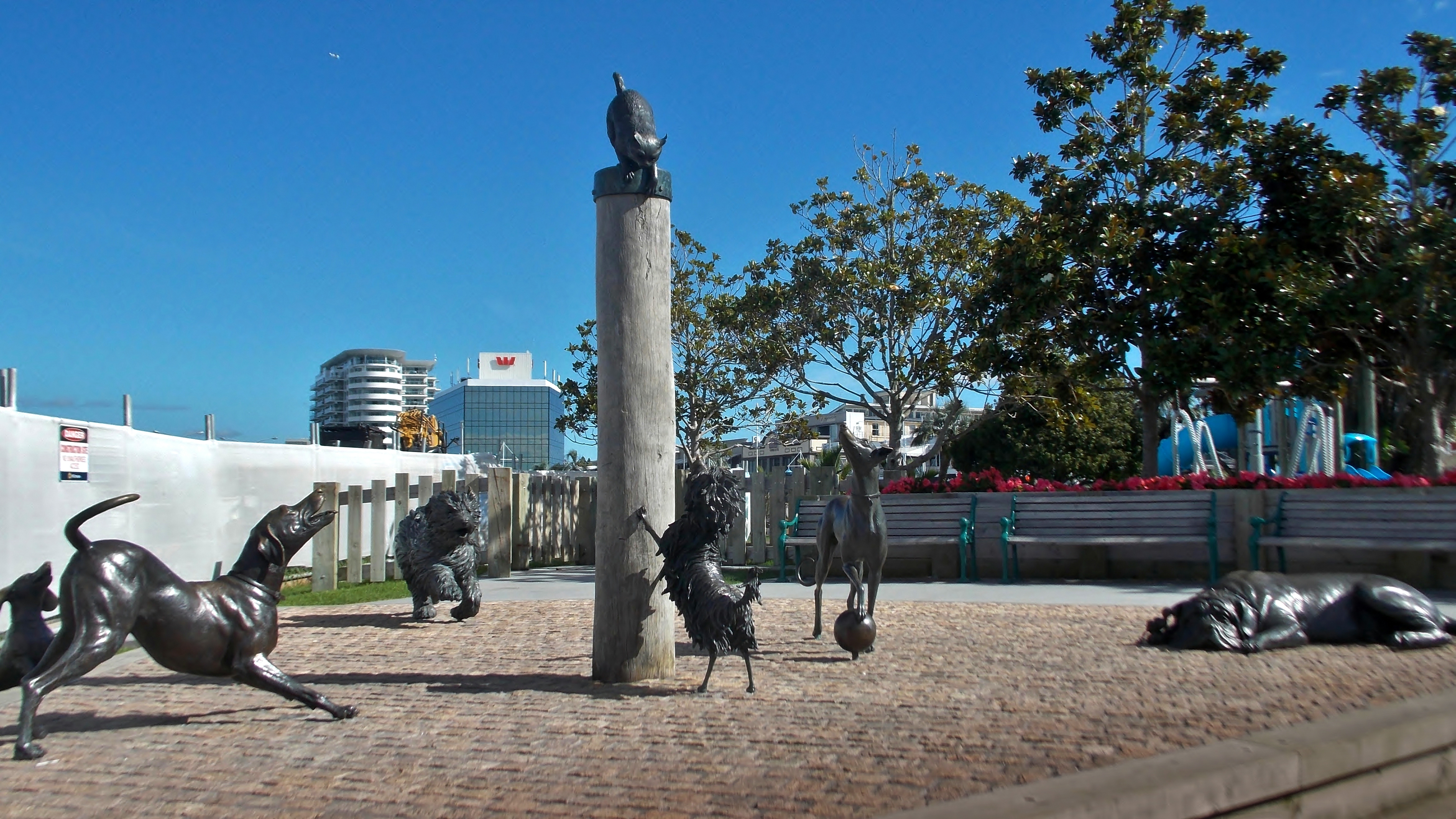
Sculpture of Hairy Maclary and other characters on the waterfront of Tauranga

Hairy Maclary and Friends is a series of children's picture books created by New Zealand author and illustrator Dame Lynley Dodd. The popular series has sold over five million copies worldwide. The character Hairy Maclary made his first appearance in 1983 in the book titled Hairy Maclary from Donaldson's Dairy. He is the protagonist in twelve books in the series, and there are a further nine books about his friends.

Hairy Maclary's adventures are usually in the company of his other dog friends who include an English Mastiff named Hercules Morse, a dalmatian named Bottomley Potts, an Old English Sheepdog named Muffin McLay, a greyhound named Bitzer Maloney and a dachshund named Schnitzel Von Krumm. The series also features a belligerent soft grey tabby named Scarface Claw, their formidable opponent, a black cat named Slinky Malinki and a duckling named Zachary Quack.

According to the books' website, Hairy Maclary is "a small dog of mixed pedigree". Dodd has described him as a mix of terriers that she knows, "an animated bottlebrush" and "a caricature rather than a real dog". However, Hairy Maclary does strike some resemblance to a Scottish Terrier.

== Description ==
Hairy Maclary books are designed to be read by an adult to a child. The plots are simple, in keeping with the comprehension level of the age group for which they are written. They generally involve Hairy and his friends in adventurous scenarios pitched against local cats. The animals in this series, unlike the creatures of Beatrix Potter's stories, are not given human thoughts and motives; their actions tell the stories, and reflect their animal natures.

Each double-sided page has an illustration on one side and text on the other. The pictures and the written words together tell the story, and the illustrations and their meanings are as important as the text. Dodd stated that "in a picture book it is very important that text and picture should fit together perfectly; in mood, style and sympathy—a partnership in which each enhances the other." The books have a wide format that enables a child seated beside an adult to have a full view of the picture page while the adult reads.

The text is written in rhythmic verse with simple rhymes like "Bottomley Potts covered in spots, Hercules Morse as big as a horse". Characters, events and language are repetitive and cumulative, in the manner of "Old MacDonald had a farm". Each book contains a twist or some sort of conclusion at the end.

Although the books are designed to entertain young children, they are not intended as "early readers". The Hairy Maclary books, despite their simple stories, introduce the listening child to some long but very expressive words, which are not part of the average pre-schooler's vocabulary but must be understood by the child in the context in which they occur. For example, the noise made by a stranded cat and the excited dogs who discover it is described as a "cacophony". Dodd enjoys using unusual words in the books. Criticised once by a reviewer for using the word 'bellicose' about Hairy Maclary, Dodd replied that she was 'unrepentant', saying "if we spend our time writing only language appropriate to the age of the reader, they will never learn anything new. How boring!"

Lynley Dodd's illustrations are closely observed from life. The breeds of dogs, the types of houses and the plants growing in each garden can generally be identified. In the first book of the series the repeated lines "...and Hairy Maclary from Donaldson's Dairy" accompany a series of illustrations showing Hairy Maclary sniffing at the bottom of a lamppost, burrowing into a hedge, barking at some birds, raiding a garbage can and hiding in grass with some sunflowers next to him. Close observation is encouraged by the inclusion in many of the pictures of a tiny glimpse of the dog who has been named on the previous page, as it approaches or walks out of the picture, showing only the point of a nose or the tip of a tail.

== Adaptations and legacy ==
In the 1990s, a television series featuring ten five-minute episodes based on the series premiered. In 2015, a sculpture of Hairy Maclary and other characters from the books was officially unveiled on the waterfront in Tauranga (the home of Lynley Dodd) by former prime minister John Key. In the 2019 TVNZ series Goodnight Kiwi, prime minister Jacinda Ardern read Hairy Maclary from Donaldson's Dairy; the episode aired on TVNZ 2 on Christmas Day.

Foreign language editions of the Hairy Maclary books have been published in Sweden, Japan, Slovenia, Russia, Korea and China.
