= Dorothy Butler =

Children's book author

Dorothy Butler OBE
- Born: Muriel Dorothy Norgrove; 24 April 1925; Grey Lynn, Auckland, New Zealand
- Died: 20 September 2015 (aged 90); Te Atatū Peninsula, Auckland, New Zealand
- Education: Auckland University College
- Occupations: Author, bookseller
- Spouse: Roy Edward Butler
- Children: 8

Muriel Dorothy Butler OBE (née Norgrove, 24 April 1925 – 20 September 2015) was a New Zealand children's book author, bookseller, memoirist and reading advocate. She was a recipient of the Eleanor Farjeon Award.

== Personal life ==
Butler was born in the Auckland suburb of Grey Lynn on 24 April 1925, the daughter of William Victor Norgrove and his wife Emily Isobel Norgrove (née Brown). She was educated at Auckland Girls' Grammar School, before studying at Auckland University College, from where she graduated with a Bachelor of Arts in 1947. She became engaged to her future husband, Roy Edward Butler, in August 1945, and they were married in 1947. They went on to have eight children together, six daughters and two sons.

Butler died on 20 September 2015 in Te Atatū Peninsula, Auckland.

== Work ==
She established the Dorothy Butler Children's Bookshop in Auckland which remains a going concern, albeit under new ownership. A brief history of the bookshop's early years was reported in the April 1977 issue of the Horn Book magazine.

Canadian writer Michele Landsberg described Butler's Babies Need Books as "a trail-blazing and completely accessible book, written with charm and vivacity and detailed, helpful advice" and said that Cushla and Her Books was notable as "a dramatic, true and detailed account of how the life of a multiply handicapped child was transformed through picture books. Indispensable for parents and teachers of handicapped children." Jim Trelease retold the story of Cushla in several editions of The Read-Aloud Handbook.

== Honours and awards ==
Butler was awarded a Diploma in Education from the University of Auckland for her study of her severely handicapped granddaughter Cushla; this research was later adapted for publication as Cushla and Her Books.

Butler won the Children's Book Circle Eleanor Farjeon Award in 1980.

In 1992, Butler became the second recipient of the Margaret Mahy Award, whose winners present and publish a lecture concerning children's literature or literacy. Butler's lecture was titled Telling Tales. In 1991 she was awarded the Children's Literature Association's Award for Services to Children's Literature (now Betty Gilderdale Award).

In the 1993 New Year Honours, Butler was appointed an Officer of the Order of the British Empire, for services to children's literature.

== Bibliography ==
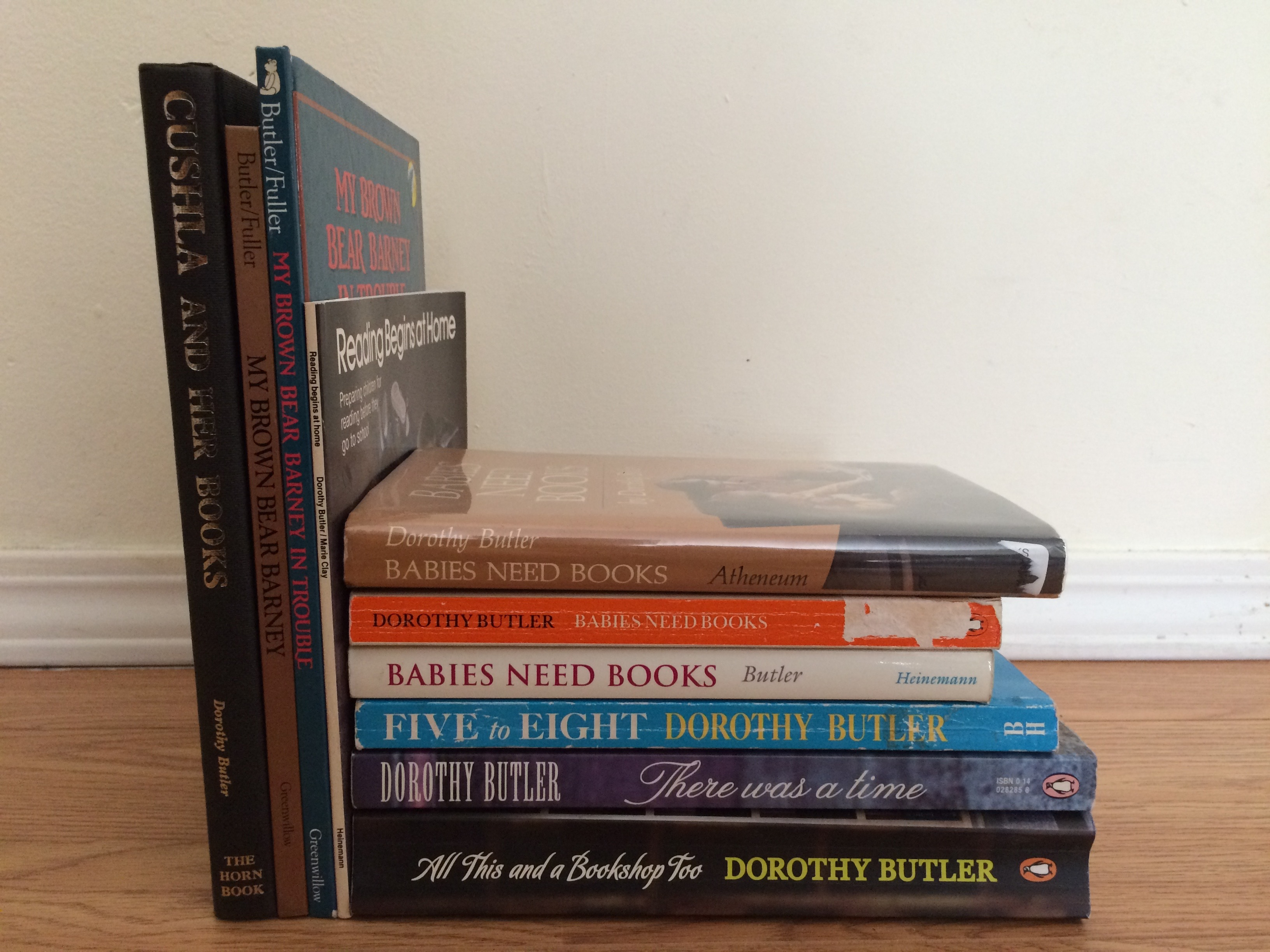
An assortment of Dorothy Butler books including multiple editions of Babies Need Books, her autobiography, Cushla and Her Books and My Brown Bear Barney.

=== Non-fiction ===
- Babies Need Books
- Children, Books and Families
- Cushla and Her Books
- Five to Eight: Vital Years for Reading
- Reading Begins at Home: Preparing Children for Reading Before They Go to School (with Marie Clay)

=== Autobiography ===
- There Was a Time
- All This and a Bookshop Too

=== Children's books ===
- Another Happy Tale
- Bears, Bears, Bears
- Behave Yourself, Martha
- Birthday Rain
- The Breakdown Day
- A Bundle of Birds
- By Jingo! A Tale of Old New Zealand
- Come Back Ginger: A Tale of Old New Zealand
- Davy's Ducks: A Tale of Old New Zealand
- Farm Boy, City Girl
- "Farmer Beetroot's Birthday"
- Farmyard Fiasco
- Good Morning, Mrs. Martin
- A Happy Tale
- Hector, an Old Bear
- Higgledy Piggledy Hobbledy Hoy
- Just a Dog
- The Little, Little Man
- Lulu
- My Brown Bear Barney
- My Brown Bear Barney at School
- My Brown Bear Barney at the Party
- My Brown Bear Barney in Trouble
- My Monkey Martha
- O'Reilly and the Real Bears
- Seadog: A Tale of Old New Zealand
- Smile Please, Martha
- What a Birthday!
- What Peculiar People!
- Where's Isabella?

=== Anthologies ===
- For Me, Me, Me: Poems for the Very Young
- I Will Build You a House: Poems
- The Magpies Said: Stories and Poems from New Zealand
- Reading for Enjoyment for 0-6 Year Olds
