= Betty Gilderdale =

New Zealand children's author (1923–2021)

Betty Gilderdale MNZM
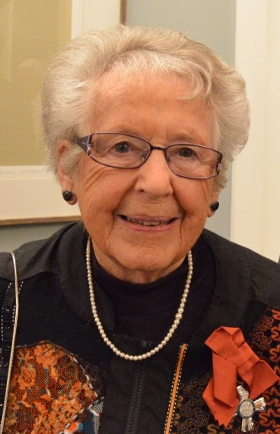
- Gilderdale in 2014
- Born: Betty Albertina Harrington; 26 July 1923; London, England
- Died: 9 July 2021 (aged 97)
- Education: University of London
- Spouse: Alan Gilderdale (m. 1949; died 2013)
- Children: Four
- Writing career
- Genre: Children's books
- Notable awards: Margaret Mahy Medal and Lecture Award

Betty Albertina Gilderdale MNZM (née Harrington; 26 July 1923 – 9 July 2021) was an English-born children's author from New Zealand. She was appointed a Member of the New Zealand Order of Merit in 2014 for her services to children's literature.

== Background ==
Gilderdale was born on 26 July 1923 in London and emigrated to New Zealand in 1967. In 1949, she received a BA in English from the University of London. The same year, she married Alan Gilderdale, and the couple went on to have four children. Between 1969 and 1981 Gilderdale taught at the North Shore Teachers’ College, at the Auckland College of Education from 1981 to 1985 and at the University of Auckland in the Department of Continuing Education. She lived on the North Shore in Auckland. Gilderdale died on 9 July 2021, aged 97, having been predeceased by her husband in 2013.

== Career ==
Gilderdale created the Little Yellow Digger series, with illustrations by her husband Alan Gilderdale. Books in the series include:

- The Little Yellow Digger (Scholastic, 1993)
- The Little Yellow Digger at the Zoo (Scholastic, 1999)
- The Little Yellow Digger Saves the Whale (Scholastic, 2001)
- The Little Yellow Digger Goes to School (Scholastic, 2005)
- The Little Digger and the Bones (Scholastic, 2009)

The first book in the series has been translated into Māori, as Te Mīhini Iti Kōwhai by Huia Publishers.

In 1990, she compiled the short story collection Under the Rainbow: A Treasury of New Zealand Children's Stories.

Gilderdale is the author of The Seven Lives of Lady Barker: Author of Station Life in New Zealand, a biography of author Mary Anne Barker. She is also the author of Sea Change: 145 Years of New Zealand Junior Fiction and Introducing Margaret Mahy.

In 2012, her autobiography, My Life in Two Halves was published.

Gilderdale was a founder and served as president of the Children's Media Watch group. She was also president of and a lifetime member of the Children’s Literature Association of New Zealand.

== Honours and awards ==
In 1994, Gilderdale received the Margaret Mahy Medal and Lecture Award for her contribution to children's literature. In 1999, she won the New Zealand Children's Literature Association's Award for Services to Children's Literature. The following year, the award was renamed in her honour to the Storylines Betty Gilderdale Award. The Little Yellow Digger won the 2003 Storylines Gaelyn Gordon Award for a Much-loved Book. A Sea Change: 145 Years of New Zealand Junior Fiction received the PEN Award for best first book of prose.

In the 2014 Queen's Birthday Honours, Gilderdale was appointed a member of the New Zealand Order of Merit in recognition of services to children's literature.
