= Eve Sutton =

- Born: Evelyn Mary Breakell; 14 September 1906; Preston, Lancashire, England
- Died: 19 December 1992 (aged 86); Auckland, New Zealand
- Occupation: Author
- Known for: Children's books
- Notable work: My Cat Likes to Hide in Boxes
- Relatives: Lynley Dodd (cousin-in-law)

Evelyn Mary Sutton (née Breakell, 14 September 1906 – 19 December 1992), commonly known as Eve Sutton, was a New Zealand writer of literature for children.

== Early life and family ==
Evelyn Mary Breakell was born in Preston, Lancashire, England, on 14 September 1906. She worked as a primary school teacher from 1927 to 1931, when she married Arthur Sutton at Christ Church, Fulwood, Preston. In 1949, the family migrated to New Zealand, and Eve Sutton became a naturalised New Zealand citizen in 1955.

== Writing career ==
Sutton's first children's book, My Cat Likes to Hide in Boxes, was written after her cousin by marriage, Lynley Dodd, suggested that they collaborate on a book; Sutton wrote the text and Dodd provided the illustrations. Now regarded as a New Zealand classic, it was Sutton's only picture book, and it received the Esther Glen Award in 1975.

Subsequently, Sutton went on to write books for older children, including a series of novels about the experiences of immigrants to New Zealand. In 1990, she was awarded the New Zealand Children's Literature Association's Award for Services to Children's Literature.

== Death ==
Sutton died on 19 December 1992, and her body was cremated at Purewa Crematorium, Auckland.

== Books ==
- 1973 — My Cat Likes to Hide in Boxes
- 1976 — Green Gold
- 1977 — Johnny Sweep
- 1977 — Tuppenny Brown
- 1978 — Moa Hunter
- 1983 — Surgeon's Boy
- 1983 — Skip for the Huntaway
- 1984 — Kidnapped by Blackbirders
- 1987 — Valley of Heavenly Gold
