= Ceux de 14 =

Books series by Maurice Genevoix

- 'Neath Verdun; Nuits de guerre; Au seuil des guitounes; La Boue; Les Éparges
- Author: Maurice Genevoix
- Country: France
- Language: French
- Published: 1916–1923

Ceux de 14 (lit. 'Those of 14') is a series of five autobiographical books about World War I by the French writer Maurice Genevoix. It was published from 1916 to 1923 and revised into a single work published in 1949. Only the first book, 'Neath Verdun, has been published in English.

== Summary ==
Genevoix retells his experiences as a young lieutenant in the French infantry during the first nine months of World War I. Few of the soldiers he led survived the war. According to Genevoix, the names of soldiers and civilians are invented, but all the people portrayed are real.

== Volumes ==
1. 'Neath Verdun: August–October, 1914 (French: Sous Verdun, août–octobre 1914) (Hachette 1916), translated into English by H. Grahame Richards, Hutchinson & Co. 1916
2. Nuits de guerre (Flammarion 1917)
3. Au seuil des guitounes (Flammarion 1918)
4. La Boue (Flammarion 1921)
5. Les Éparges (Flammarion 1923)
- Ceux de 14 (2 volumes, Durassié et Cie 1949)

== Reception ==
The first volume was shortlisted for the Prix Goncourt and the second was shortlisted for the Prix Femina. The first two volumes jointly received the Prix Marcelin Guérin from the Académie Française.

== Adaptation ==
Ceux de 14 was the basis for France 3's six-part television serial Ceux de 14 from 2014. It was directed by Olivier Schatzky and stars Théo Frilet in the role of Genevoix.
