= Hairy Maclary's Rumpus at the Vet =

1989 children's book by Lynley Dodd

- Author: Lynley Dodd
- Series: Hairy Maclary and Friends
- Pages: 32

Hairy Maclary's Rumpus at the Vet (1989) is the fifth book in Lynley Dodd's Hairy Maclary and Friends children's book series.

The story centres on Hairy Maclary waiting to see other animals at the vet. But the other animals at the vet try to turn the waiting room to a keruffling, scramble of paws, a tango of bodies and a jumble of jaws.
