= Verdun Memorial =

War memorial in Meuse, France

- France
- For the French and Germans who fought in the Battle of Verdun
- Location: 49°11′41″N 5°26′1″E

The Verdun Memorial is a war memorial to commemorate the Battle of Verdun, fought in 1916 as part of the First World War. It is situated on the battlefield, close to the destroyed village of Fleury-devant-Douaumont in the département of Meuse in north-eastern France.

It was built during the 1960s, financed by Maurice Genevoix and has been open to the public since September 17, 1967. It remembers both French and German combatants as well as the civilian populations lost during the Battle of Verdun. Furthermore, it is a military museum which displays French and German armaments (including rifles, machine guns and field artillery), military vehicles, uniforms and equipment of both French and German troops during the battle.

== The Douaumont ossuary ==
The Douaumont ossuary is a memorial containing the remains of soldiers who died on the battlefield during the Battle of Verdun in World War I.

== Gallery ==
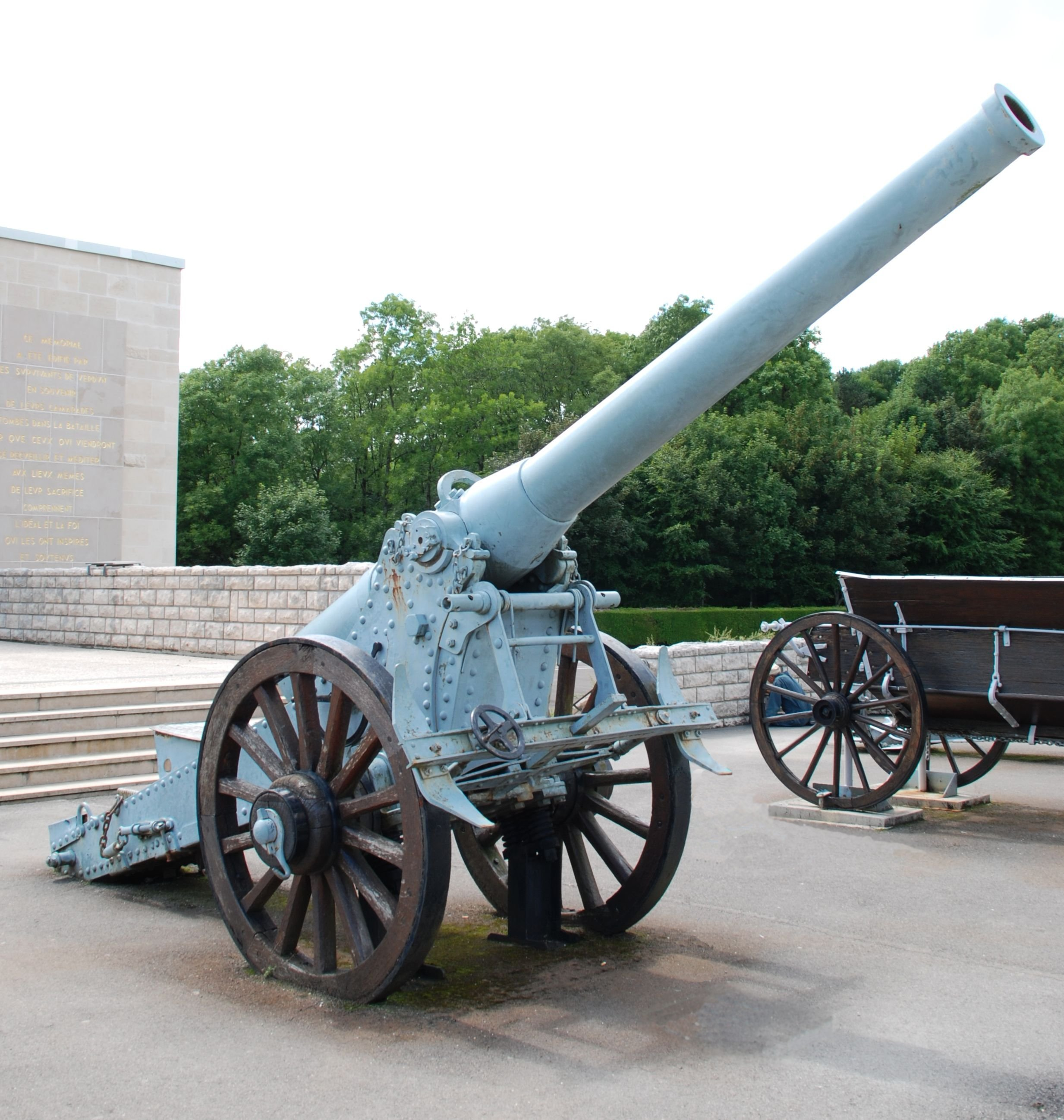
