= Rroû =

1931 novel by Maurice Genevoix

Rroû: The Story of a Cat
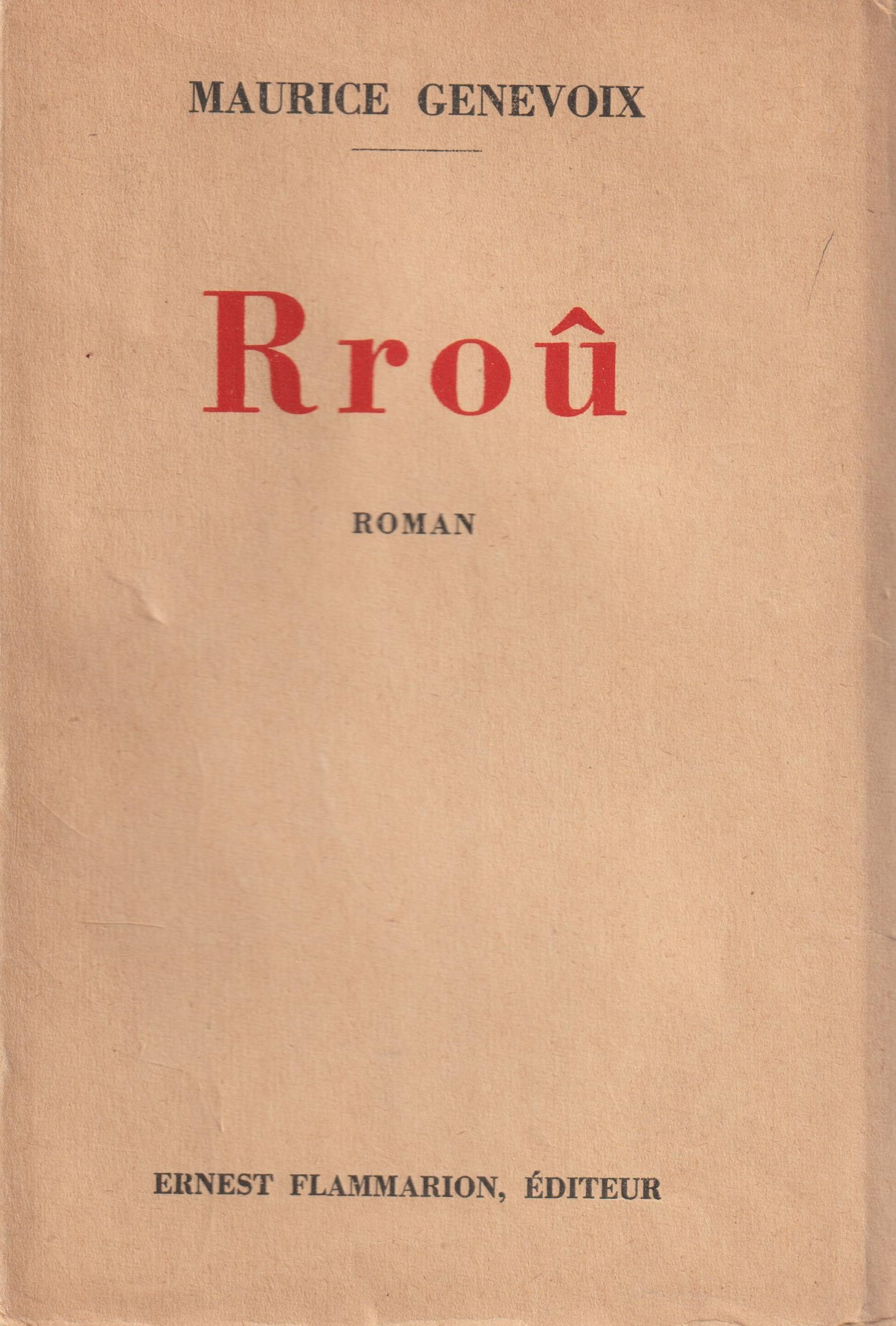
- Author: Maurice Genevoix
- Original title: Rroû
- Translator: Alice Grant Roseman
- Language: French
- Publisher: Ernest Flammarion
- Publication date: 1931
- Publication place: France
- English publication date: 1932
- Pages: 284

Rroû: The Story of a Cat (French: Rroû) is a 1931 novel by the French writer Maurice Genevoix. It follows the kitten Rroû with his young owner Clémence in the city, on holiday in the French countryside, back in the city and as he escapes to the countryside again. An English translation by Alice Grant Roseman was published in 1932.

Ellen Lewis Buell of The New York Times called the book "a sensitive, minute analysis of a cat's world". She described the parts about Rroû's early childhood as particularly lyrical and the work overall as "reminiscent of the animal paintings of eighteenth-century Japanese art".

The novel was the basis for the 2023 film A Cat's Life directed by Guillaume Maidatchevsky.

== See also ==
- List of fictional cats in literature
