= Raboliot =

Book of Maurice Genevoix

Raboliot is a French novel, written by Maurice Genevoix, published in 1925. It evokes the life of a poacher from Sologne. Considered his greatest work, it won the Prix Goncourt in 1925. The name Raboliot means "wild rabbit" in French.

== Plot ==
The novel is set in the country-side around Lamotte-Beuvron and Brinon-sur-Sauldre, and deals with the relationship between landowners and poor people in the years after World War I.

== Adaptations ==
Several adaptations for the screen have been made - these include Jacques Daroy's version of 1946, with Julien Bertheau as Raboliot, and a 2008 version directed by Jean-Daniel Verhaege which starred Thierry Frémont as Raboliot.
