= A Cat's Life =

- Theatrical release poster
- Directed by: Guillaume Maidatchevsky
- Written by: Guillaume Maidatchevsky; Michaël Souhaité
- Based on: Rroû by Maurice Genevoix
- Produced by: Jean-Pierre Bailly; Stéphane Millière
- Starring: Capucine Sainson-Fabresse; Corinne Masiero; Lucie Laurent; Nicolas Umbdenstock; Juliette Gillis
- Cinematography: Daniel Meyer
- Edited by: Jeanne Kef
- Music by: Julien Jaouen
- Production companies: MC4; Orange Studio
- Distributed by: Orange Studio; UGC Distribution (France); JMH Distributions (Switzerland)
- Release date: 5 April 2023
- Running time: 82 minutes
- Countries: France; Switzerland
- Language: French
- Budget: €4.10 million
- Box office: $2 million

A Cat's Life (French: Mon chat et moi, la grande aventure de Rroû, lit. 'My cat and I, the great adventure of Rroû') is a 2023 adventure drama film directed and written by Guillaume Maidatchevsky. The film is based on the 1931 novel Rroû by Maurice Genevoix.

The film was released in France on 5 April 2023.

== Premise ==
A Parisian girl named Clémence forms an unbreakable bond with a kitten named Lou after finding it in her attic. When her family decides to take a vacation in the countryside, Lou's natural curiosity leads to thrilling adventures in the woods.

== Cast ==
- Capucine Sainson-Fabresse as Clémence
- Corinne Masiero as Madeleine
- Lucie Laurent as Isa
- Nicolas Casar-Umbdenstock as Fred
- Juliette Gillis as La copine de Clémence

== Production ==
The film was filmed in Paris and Nancy for the interiors, and in the Vosges mountains, in Plainfaing and La Bresse, for the exteriors. With a production at cat's height, the film makes each animal a character in its own right, with its own emotions and character, all in mountainous landscapes more beautiful than ever.

Muriel Bec, who was a specialist in animal training for the film, “coached” the animals. An animal director has more than 150 shoots to her credit.

== Reception ==
On the review aggregator website Rotten Tomatoes, 75% of 8 critics' reviews are positive, with an average rating of 6.7/10. Writing for Common Sense Media, Monique Jones stated "If you grew up loving films like the Homeward Bound series, then you'll probably like A Cat's Life, since much of the film is about Lou discovering the magic and perils of life in the wild." Thelma Adams of AARP Movies for Grownups wrote in her review "One purr, one death-defying leap, one loss at a time in a rare family movie of gentle pleasures."

=== Box office ===
In France, the film made $220,067 in 336 theaters in its first weekend, ranking in 11. On its second weekend, it made $274,366 in 419 theaters, rising in from 24.7%, ranking in 14. On its third weekend, it made $267,404 in 450 theaters, dropping in from 2.5%, ranking in 13. On its fourth weekend, it made $194,550 in 428 theaters, dropping in from 27.2%, ranking in from 18. On its final weekend, it made $53,476 on 277 theaters, dropping in from 72.5%, ranking in 26. Its total gross was $1,438,216.

In the United States, the film grossed $58,812 in its opening weekend, and made $162,363 in total in the entire limited run.

== Release ==
=== Theatrical ===
On 12 January 2022, Orange Studio has launched the sales for the film, along with The Nannies and The Green Perfume.

A Cat's Life was released in France on 5 April 2023. The film got a limited theatrical release in the United States on 29 March 2024, by Blue Fox Entertainment.

=== Home media ===
The film was released to DVD in France on 16 August 2023.

In the United States, Blue Fox Entertainment released the film to digital and on-demand on 30 April 2024, and later a DVD release on 2 July 2024.
