= Slinky Malinki =

Book by Lynley Dodd

Slinky Malinki is a fictional black cat who features in the Hairy Maclary children's stories written by New Zealand author Lynley Dodd. Other characters who appear in the books include the Poppadum Kittens, a ginger cat named Butterball Brown, a Siamese cat named Pimpernel Pugh, a grey kitten named Greywacke Jones, a grey tabby cat named Mushroom Magee, a tiger cat named Grizzly MacDuff, and a rainbow lorikeet named Stickybeak Syd.

== Slinky Malinki ==
Slinky Malinki book cover

Slinky Malinki, first published in 1990, is one of a well-known series of books by New Zealand author Lynley Dodd.

The book is written for pre-school children, with rhythmic, rhyming text. It has become a best-selling bedtime storybook in New Zealand.

Malinki is based on Dodd's cat, Wooskit, who was with her for 13 years, and her later cat Suu Kyi. Slinky Malinki is very silly. The Guardian lists Malinki amongst the top ten cats in children's fiction. Original artwork of him has been part of a travelling exhibition over a number of years, and he is part of a sculpture of some of Dodd's characters at Tauranga. In 2015 Malinki featured alongside other Lynley Dodd characters in an Edinburgh Fringe show for children, Hairy Maclary's Cat Tales by Nonsense Productions.

=== Reception ===
The book received mixed reviews when first published. School Library Journal found that "While there's nothing wrong with this book, there's nothing to recommend it, either", and concluded "It's hard to imagine many preschoolers who would sit through the whole book. There's just nothing to it." By contrast, a reviewer for Booklist compared Malinki to one of Eliot's cats, highlighted the verse and illustrations, and concluded that "New readers will find the vocabulary varied and occasionally challenging but are sure to enjoy the fun." Multiple editions have been published in the UK and US, as well as Australia and New Zealand, most recently in 2015. A translation into Russian was published in 2011.

It has also been reviewed by Magpies magazine.

It is used in the teaching of language to children.

== Slinky Malinki Open The Door ==
Slinky Malinki Open The Door, first published in 1993, has become a best-selling bedtime storybook in New Zealand. Malinki has a parrot friend called Stickybeak Syd, and together they open doors in their house and get into mischief.

It has been recommended to educators for the incorporation of instruments during story time.

After the 2000 US presidential election had been described as a 'schmozzle', Dodd's use of the word 'shemozzle' in this book was discussed in US media, with the following verse quoted:

What a SHEMOZZLE, the things they did, Slinky Malinki and Stickybeak Syd.

They stirred up some spoons and a bowl full of fruit,

In a sea of spaghetti and vegetable soup.

== Slinky Malinki Catflaps ==
First published in 1998.

== Slinky Malinki's Christmas Crackers ==
Slinky Malinki climbs the Christmas tree, causing a "GLORIOUS mess". When the family repair the damage, they are unable to find the fairy, as Slinky Malinki has hidden it under the rug. "Oh foozle!", they exclaim, before realising that Slinky has taken the fairy's place at the top of the tree. Slinky Malinki's Christmas Crackers was first published in 2006 by Mallinson Rendel. The story was inspired by Dodd's cat Suu Kyi's obsession with a particular red-nosed mouse Christmas tree decoration. It was described as "guaranteed to be reread a lot" and "a festive favourite".

== Slinky Malinki Early Bird ==
Slinky Malinki Early Bird, first published in 2012, is written with rhythmic, rhyming text and is popular with pre-school age children. Slinky Malinki wakes the whole family early, and then goes back to sleep, leaving everyone awake and complaining. It has been described as "Slinky Malinki's best caper yet."

It was named a Storylines Notable Book in 2013.

== See also ==
- Scarface Claw, a fictitious tomcat who features in the Hairy Maclary children's stories.
