= Ruth A. McIntyre =

American historian (1915–1986)

- Born: April 26, 1915; Springfield, Massachusetts, U.S.
- Died: May 11, 1986 (aged 71); Springfield, Massachusetts, U.S.
- Occupation: Historian
- Awards: Guggenheim Fellowship (1949)

Academic background
- Education: Mount Holyoke College; University of Minnesota
- Thesis: The role of the English merchant in the promotion of discovery and colonial enterprise, 1496–1616 (1947)

Academic work
- Institutions: University of Minnesota; Hunter College; Mount Holyoke College; Wells College; Holyoke Community College

Ruth Allan McIntyre (April 26, 1915 – May 11, 1986) was an American historian. A 1949 Guggenheim Fellow, she was author of Debts Hopeful and Desperate (1963) and a professor at Wells College and Holyoke Community College.

== Biography ==
McIntyre was born on April 26, 1915, in Springfield, Massachusetts, daughter of Catherine (née Allan) and Raymond K. McIntyre. After spending a year in Springfield Junior College (1932–1933), she obtained her BA and MA from Mount Holyoke College in 1936 and 1937, respectively. She worked at the University of Minnesota as a teaching assistant (1937–1940) before going on a 1940–1941 Wellesley College fellowship.

After working as an assistant at G & C Merriam Co. (1941–1942) and Columbia Law School (1942–1944), McIntyre worked as a history instructor at Hunter College (1943–1944) and Mount Holyoke College (1944–1946). She later returned to UMinn, where she was an instructor (1946–1947) and obtained a PhD in 1947; her doctoral dissertation was titled The role of the English merchant in the promotion of discovery and colonial enterprise, 1496–1616. She became a history lecturer at Wells College in 1947, before being promoted to assistant professor in 1948. She was part of the Holyoke Community College (HCC) faculty from 1962 until her retirement in 1977, working as a professor.

In 1949, McIntyre received a Guggenheim Fellowship for "studies of the role of the English merchant class and of certain individual merchants as promoters of early 17th century discovery and of colonial enterprise". In 1963, she published Debts Hopeful and Desperate, a book on the "business side" of the Plymouth Colony. (Note: Reviews of this book:) Her academic work also included research on the Connecticut Valley Historical Museum's Pynchon Papers.

A senior college transfer scholarship was dedicated to McIntyre, and in February 1978, so was HCC's library reference section. She attended All Saint's Episcopal Church in her native South Hadley.

McIntyre died on May 11, 1986, in Baystate Medical Center, in Springfield, Massachusetts; she was 71. Having moved from South Hadley, McIntyre lived in West Springfield at the time of her death.

== Bibliography ==
- Debts Hopeful and Desperate (1963)
