= Goodnight Kiwi (TV series) =

New Zealand TV series

- Developed by: TVNZ
- Country of origin: New Zealand
- Original language: English
- No. of episodes: 11

Original release
- Release: 11 November 2019

Goodnight Kiwi is a New Zealand TV show where well-known New Zealanders are presented reading children's books. It is intended to be watched before bed, and is based on the TV sign-off animation, Goodnight Kiwi. Each episode is around three minutes long and available on TVNZ+. It includes animations, original illustrations and live performances. The episodes begin with a variation of the original Goodnight Kiwi animation, where the kiwi and cat jump into the satellite dish.

It was announced in October 2019 and released on 11 November of the same year. This was after it was hinted in July that Goodnight Kiwi may make a comeback to television. To promote the series, Hilary Barry and Jeremy Wells got into bed together on an episode of Seven Sharp and read a bedtime story to each other. Wells was nude in the bed, which brought some criticism although the majority of people found it funny. It was one of the most read stories of The New Zealand Herald in 2019. The show was made in partnership with The Warehouse, who started a 'buy one give one' campaign after the series started for the books appearing in the episodes. It was made 25 years after Goodnight Kiwi stopped being displayed on television sign offs. The series is aimed at inspiring children to read books and help with their literacy. On the Christmas episode, Prime Minister Jacinda Ardern read Hairy Maclary from Donaldson's Dairy.

== Presenters ==
Well-known New Zealanders read a bedtime story in each episode. These include:

- Jacinda Ardern, Prime Minister at the time
- Oscar Kightley, actor
- Jayden Daniels, actor
- Urzila Carlson, comedian
- Topp Twins, comedy duo
- Dean O'Gorman, actor
- Hillary Barry, journalist and TV personality
- Jeremy Wells, broadcaster
- Stacey Morrison, broadcaster
- Evander Brown, TV personality
- Jackie van Beek, actress
- Madeleine Sami, actress
