= Scarface Claw =

Scarface Claw the "toughest Tom in town", is a fictional tom cat who features in the Hairy Maclary children's stories written by New Zealand author Lynley Dodd. A large, black cat with big yellow eyes and chunks missing from his ears, Scarface has a reputation as the "toughest Tom in town".

== Appearances ==
Scarface Claw is introduced in the first Hairy Maclary story, the 1983 Hairy Maclary from Donaldson's Dairy, where he appears from the shadows to terrify Hairy Maclary and his canine friends as they prowl through the town. He features in several of the books that follow, including Hairy Maclary Scattercat (1985), Caterwaul Caper (1987) (where he becomes stuck up a tree and shatters the town's peace and quiet with his appalling howling), Rumpus at the Vet (1989), Hairy Maclary's Showbusiness (1991) (a cat show where he wins the prize for "Most Bad-Tempered"), and Slinky Malinki Catflaps (1998). Scarface's first starring role was in the 2001 eponymous book, where he proves unafraid of anything, including dogs, thunderstorms, and large hairy spiders but in the final scene is reduced to abject terror by catching sight of himself in a dusty mirror.

Scarface Claw's second starring book, Scarface Claw, Hold Tight, was released on 2 October 2017.

Claw is the central figure of the exhibition, "The Life and Times of Scarface Claw", that included more than 40 illustrations of "the roughest and toughest, boldest and bravest of cats".

== See also ==
- Slinky Malinki, a fictitious cat who features in the Hairy Maclary and the sixth book in the series.
