= Midnight Louie =

Fictional black cat created by Carole Nelson Douglas

Midnight Louie is the name of a slightly overweight (20 pounds) fictional black cat in a series of mystery novels by author Carole Nelson Douglas, and is the general title for the same series. Each volume of the series is told from the point of view of the cat's "roommate", Temple Barr, a freelance public relations consultant, and from the point of view of Midnight Louie, the cat himself. Midnight Louie's chapters are written in what the author describes as a style reminiscent of Damon Runyon, generic gumshoe, and Mrs. Malaprop. As the Las Vegas-set series continues, three other main human characters have points of view: a hard-boiled female homicide detective, C.R. Molina; Matt Devine, an ex-priest; and Max Kinsella, a stage magician. The mix of adventure, mystery, humor and social issues is why the author describes the series as "cozy-noir." Midnight Louie was introduced as a character in the author's early romance-with-mystery series, initially called the Crystal series. The author was not shown galleys of the books until she demanded them, too late to undo the romance editor's deep cuts of mystery elements, including Midnight Louie sections. The books were later reverted and Douglas reissued them in the original form as The Cat and a playing card series. In the interim, Douglas had started writing Midnight Louie's own new mystery series.

Midnight Louie's Scratching Post-Intelligencer: All the News about Midnight Louie, Della Street and Irene Adler is a four-page hard copy publication with updates by the author including letters to Louie from readers, and to readers from Louie, and news from the author about newly published books and plans for more.

== Titles ==
=== Crystal series ===
- Crystal Days (1990)
- Crystal Nights (1990)

=== The Cat and a playing card series ===
- The Cat and the King of Clubs (1999)
- The Cat and the Queen of Hearts (1999)
- The Cat and the Jill of Diamonds (1999)
- The Cat and the Jack of Spades (1999), ISBN 0-7862-2896-2

=== Midnight Louie series novels ===
- Catnap (1992) ISBN 0-7927-1644-2
- Pussyfoot (1993), ISBN 0-312-85218-5
- Cat on a Blue Monday (1994), ISBN 0-312-85607-5
- Cat in a Crimson Haze (1995), ISBN 0-8125-4414-5
- Cat in a Diamond Dazzle (1996), ISBN 0-8125-5506-6
- Cat with an Emerald Eye (1996), ISBN 0-312-86228-8
- Cat in a Flamingo Fedora (1997), ISBN 0-8125-6535-5
- Cat in a Golden Garland (1997), ISBN 0-312-86386-1
- Cat on a Hyacinth Hunt (1998), ISBN 0-312-86634-8
- Cat in an Indigo Mood (1999), ISBN 0-312-86635-6
- Cat in a Jeweled Jumpsuit (1999), ISBN 0-312-86817-0
- Cat in a Kiwi Con (2000), ISBN 0-8125-8425-2
- Cat in a Leopard Spot (2001), ISBN 0-8125-7022-7
- Cat in a Midnight Choir (2002), ISBN 0-312-85797-7
- Cat in a Neon Nightmare (2003), ISBN 0-7653-4592-7
- Cat in an Orange Twist (2004), ISBN 0-7653-4593-5
- Cat in a Hot Pink Pursuit (2005), ISBN 0-7653-1399-5
- Cat in a Quicksilver Caper (2006), ISBN 0-7653-1400-2
- Cat in a Red Hot Rage (2008), ISBN 0-7653-5270-2
- Cat in a Sapphire Slipper (2008), ISBN 0-7653-1861-X
- Cat in a Topaz Tango (2009), ISBN 0-7653-1862-8
- Cat in an Ultramarine Scheme (2010), ISBN 0-7653-1863-6
- Cat in a Vegas Gold Vendetta (2011), ISBN 0-7653-2746-5
- Cat in a White Tie and Tails (2012), ISBN 0-7653-2747-3
- Cat in an Alien X-Ray (2013), ISBN 0-7653-2748-1
- Cat in a Yellow Spotlight (2014), ISBN 1-5009-2620-5
- Cat in a Zebra Zoot Suit (2015), ISBN 1-9431-7502-0
- Cat in an Alphabet Endgame (2016), ISBN 1-9431-7507-1

=== Short stories ===
- Maltese Double Cross (1992), printed in Cat Crimes II, and Year's 25 Finest Crime and Mystery Stories, 2nd Annual Edition
- Sax and the Single Cat (1993), printed in Danger in D.C., A Treasury of Cat Mysteries, Felonious Felines, ISBN 0-7862-2689-7, and White House Pet Detectives, ISBN 1-58182-243-X
- Coyote Peyote (1994), printed in Mysterious West, ISBN 0-06-017785-3, and Year's 25 Finest Crime and Mystery Stories, 4th Annual Edition
- Dog Collar (1996), published in Great Writers and Kids Write Mysteries, ISBN 0-679-87939-0
- Iä Iä Iä Iä Cthulouie! (1997), published in Cat Crimes for the Holidays, reprinted as Something Fishy
- A Baker Street Irregular (1998), printed in Midnight Louie's Pet Detectives, ISBN 0-312-86435-3
- The Mummy Case (1999), printed in Cat Crimes Through Time and The World's Finest Mystery and Crime Stories
- Something Fishy (reprint of Iä Iä Iä Iä Cthulouie!)
- License to Koi (2004), printed in Death Dines In, ISBN 0-425-19262-8
- Junior Partner in Crime (2005), printed in Creature Cozies ISBN 0-425-20127-9
- The Riches There That Lie (2006), printed in Poe's Lighthouse, ISBN 1-58767-128-X
