= Graham Oakley =

English writer and illustrator (1929–2022)

- Born: Graham Thomas Oakley; 27 August 1929; Shrewsbury, England
- Died: 19 December 2022 (aged 93); Dorset, England
- Occupations: Author, illustrator

Graham Oakley (born Graham Thomas Oakley on 27 August 1929 – 19 December 2022) was an English writer and illustrator best known for children's books including the Church Mice and Foxbury Force series.

== Early life ==
Oakley was born on 27 August 1929 to Thomas and Flora (née Madelay) Oakley in Shrewsbury, Shropshire, as their only child. Oakley grew up living above an electrical repair shop which his father ran before his family moved to Warrington.

== Education ==
Oakley's studies at Warrington Art School were interrupted when Oakley was called up for national military service in 1947, returning in 1950 to finish studies.

== Military service ==
Oakley served two years at the headquarters of the British Army of the Rhine.

== Art career ==
Oakley freelanced for London repertory theatre companies as a scenic artist from 1950 to 1955; as a design assistant at the Royal Opera House in Covent Garden, 1955 to 1957; at Crawford's Advertising Agency, 1960 to 1962; at BBC-TV as a set designer for films and series, 1962 to 1967. At BBC, Oakley worked on How Green Was My Valley, Nicholas Nickleby, Treasure Island, and Softly, Softly.

== Children's books ==
Oakley is best known for the Church Mice series of picture books (1970 to 2000), next for the Foxbury Force series (1994 to 1998). He also won a Boston Globe–Horn Book Award Special Citation in 1980 for the picture book Graham Oakley's Magical Changes. It features detailed scenes drawn on pages that are cut in half, permitting the user to "turn" the top and bottom halves separately. The combinations are surreal; the original whole-page drawings are already strange. In 1981, it was republished in France, entitled 512 for the number of different combinations possible.

The Church Mice

- The Church Mouse - Atheneum, 1972
- The Church Cat Abroad - Atheneum, 1973
- The Church Mice and the Moon - Atheneum, 1974
- The Church Mice Spread Their Wings - Macmillan (London), 1975
- The Church Mice Adrift - Macmillan (London), 1976
- The Church Mice at Bay - Macmillan (London), 1978
- The Church Mice at Christmas - Atheneum, 1980
- The Church Mice in Action - Macmillan (London), 1982
- The Diary of a Church Mouse - Macmillan (London), 1986
- The Church Mice and the Ring, 1992
- Humphrey Hits the Jackpot - Hodder Children's Books, 1998
- The Church Mice Take a Break - Hodder Children's Books, 2000

The Church Mice Adrift and The Church Mice in Action were Highly Commended runners-up for the 1976 and 1982 Kate Greenaway Medals from the Library Association, recognising the year's best children's book illustration by a British subject. (Note: Today there are usually eight books on the Greenaway Medal shortlist. According to CCSU, some runners-up through 2002 were Commended (from 1959) or Highly Commended (from 1974). There were 31 highly commended runners-up in 29 years including Oakley and two others for 1976, Oakley alone for 1982.)

The Foxbury Force

- The Foxbury Force - Macmillan, 1995
- Foxbury Force And The Pirates - Macmillan, 1996
- The Foxbury Force & The Ghost - Macmillan, 1998

Non-series Books

- Henry's Quest - Atheneum, 1986. A children's dystopian/post-apocalyptic story book
- ’’Hetty and Harriet’’ - Macmillan, 1981.

== Later life and death ==
According to the 2008 Modern Classics edition of The Church Mice, he lived in Lyme Regis, Dorset and was "mostly retired".

Oakley died in Dorset on 19 December 2022, at the age of 93.

== See also ==
- Movable books
