= The Cat's Elopement =

"The Cat's Elopement" (German: Kätzchens Entführung) is a Japanese fairy tale collected by Professor David Brauns in Japanische Marchen und Sagen (Leipzig, 1885). Andrew Lang had it translated and included in The Pink Fairy Book (1897).

== Synopsis ==
A handsome cat named Gon, belonging to a music teacher, and a lovely cat named Koma, belonging to a lady, met and fell in love. Neither of their owners would sell one of them to the other owner, and they finally decided to elope. In the evening, they were threatened by a dog; Koma fled up a tree, while Gon stood his ground to protect her; a servant came by and carried off Gon to his mistress, the princess.

A snake had fallen in love with this princess, and annoyed her with its visits. One day, when it came to annoy her once again, Gon pounced on it and killed it. After, he saw a large cat harassing a smaller one. He went to rescue the small cat and found it was Koma. He brought her to the princess and told her their story. She wept with sympathy and kept them with her; when she married a prince, she told him their story, and the prince agreed to keep them always, so they lived happily, with their many kittens playing with the prince and princess's many children.
