= Maurice Genevoix =

French writer and WWI veteran (1890-1980)

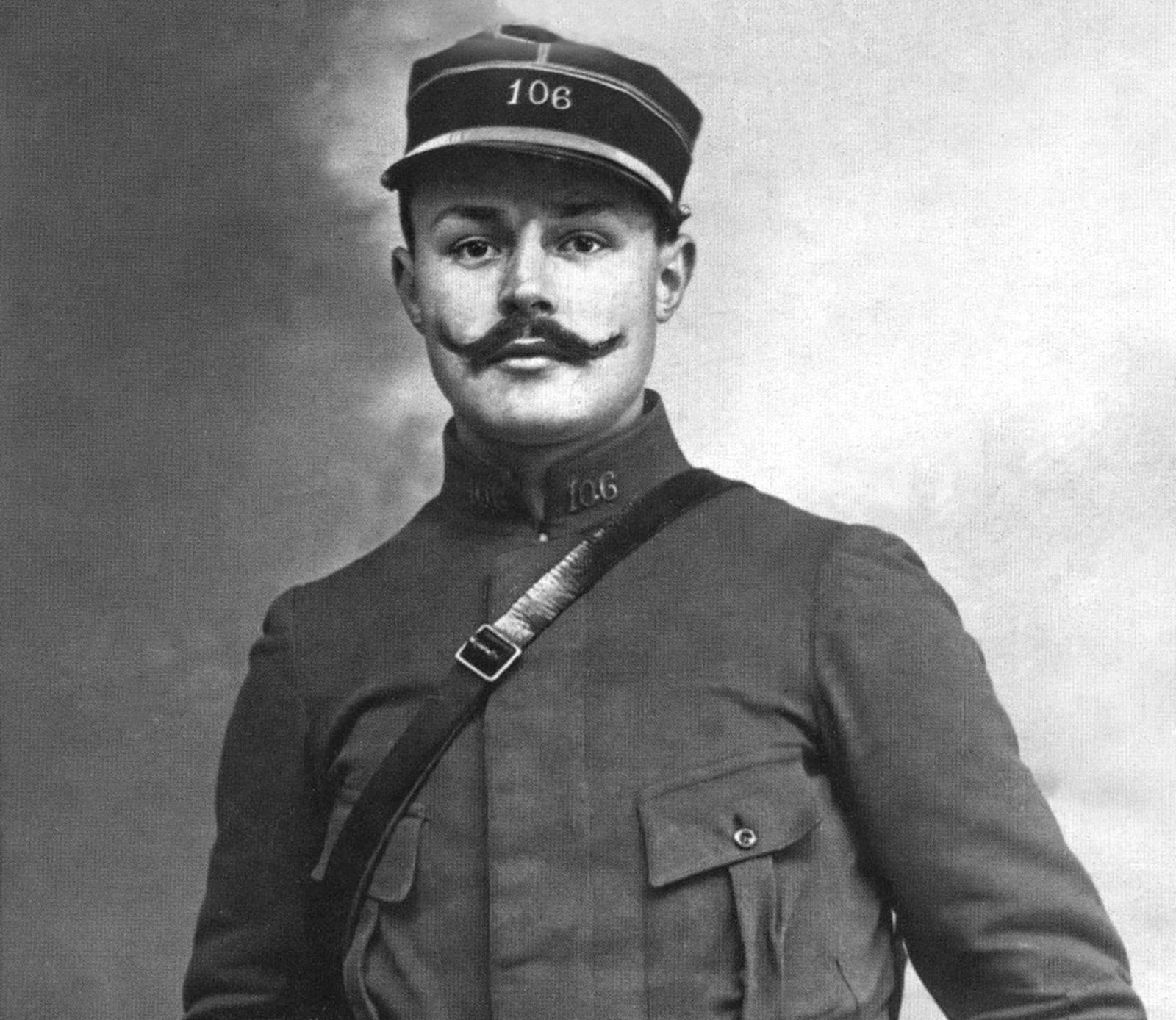
- Maurice Genevoix in 1915
- Born: 29 November 1890; Decize, France
- Died: 8 September 1980 (aged 89); Alicante, Spain
- Resting place: Panthéon
- Education: Lycée Pothier Lycée Lakanal; École normale supérieure
- Occupations: Writer and member of the Académie française
- Known for: Ceux de 14

Maurice Genevoix (French: [mɔʁis ʒǝnvwa, moʁ-]; 29 November 1890 – 8 September 1980) was a French author and WWI veteran who is best known for his book Ceux de 14 (lit. 'Those of 14' or 'The Men of 1914'), regarded as one of the great firsthand accounts of that conflict.

His body of work reflects harmonious relationships between people, between man and nature, and between man and death. Though he inherited the tradition of literary realism, his writing is marked by vivid recollection, a concern for precision, and a poetic sensibility. A graduate of the École normale supérieure in Paris, he admired the eloquence of craftsmen and peasants just as much as that of scholars. Remarkably vital despite the wounds he suffered in combat during the First World War, and driven by a determination to bear witness, he continued writing until his final days. Sustained by a desire to preserve what he considered worth remembering, his work, the product of a long literary career, comprises fifty-six books.

He is best known for his work shaped by the trauma of The Great War (1914 to 1918), most notably in Ceux de 14 (The Men of 1914), a collection of war narratives, published between 1916 and 1923, compiled in 1949. It has been regarded as one of the great firsthand accounts of that conflict. He also turned more broadly and intimately to his own life in an autobiography, Trente mille jours ('Thirty Thousand Days', not translated in English), published in 1980.

He is also known in France for his regionalist novels inspired by the Sologne and Loire Valley regions, such as Raboliot, which won the prestigious Prix Goncourt in 1925. However, he went beyond the conventions of French rural fiction (roman du terroir) through a restrained poetic talent that, combined with his deep knowledge of nature. This produced admired prose poems such as La Dernière Harde (1938) or 'The Last Herd', and La Forêt perdue or 'The Lost Forest' (1967), that have neither yet translated into English.

La Dernière Harde, in which a hunter's obsessive pursuit of a great stag has been likened to Captain Ahab's pursuit of the whale in Moby-Dick, is considered one of Genevoix's masterworks.

By decision of French President Emmanuel Macron, Maurice Genevoix's coffin was interred at the Panthéon in Paris on 11 November 2020, day of the Armistice of World War One.

== Life ==
Born on 29 November 1890 at Decize, Nièvre as Maurice-Charles-Louis-Genevoix, Genevoix spent his childhood in Châteauneuf-sur-Loire. After attending the local school, he studied at the lycée of Orléans and the Lycée Lakanal.

=== The Great War ===
Genevoix was accepted to the prestigious Ecole Normale Supérieure, being first in his class, but was soon mobilized into World War I in 1914. He was quickly promoted to a lieutenant. He participated in the bloody battles of Les Éparges hill as well as along the road of Tranchée de Calonne to the south east of Verdun-sur-Meuse in late 1914 and early 1915. On 25 April 1915, he was severely wounded in action in his left arm and side in the Tranchée de Calonne sector and returned to Paris. The battle in the Meuse in which he participated, especially those at Les Éparges left a profound influence on him, and he wrote the book series Ceux de 14 (The Men of 1914), which brought him recognition among the public.

=== Prix Goncourt ===
Around 1919, Genevoix contracted Spanish influenza, causing him to move back to the Loire. He was quite prolific during his time in the Loire area, earning a Prix Blumenthal grant from the Florence Blumenthal Foundation to support him as a professional writer. It was this grant that allowed him to continue with some of his most celebrated works, Rémi des Rauches and Raboliot, the latter of which earned him the Prix Goncourt. He portrayed the perspectives of animals in several books, notably Rroû (1931) and La Dernière Harde (1938).

=== Travels around the world ===
In 1928, his father died, and Genevoix moved to Vernelles in Loiret. At around this time, Genevoix started to travel abroad to Canada, Scandinavia, Mexico, and Africa. Canada and Africa were both admired by the writer, the latter of which he dedicated a 1949 essay to it, Afrique blanche, Afrique noire.

=== Election at the Académie française ===
He was elected to the Académie française on 24 October 1946 and was formally inducted the following year. In 1950, he returned to Paris and became secretary of the Académie française in 1958. In 1970, Genevoix, who was president of the program committee of French state radio, started a television series on French writers. He was also offered the Grand prix national des Lettres. He died on 8 September 1980 and was buried in Passy Cemetery.

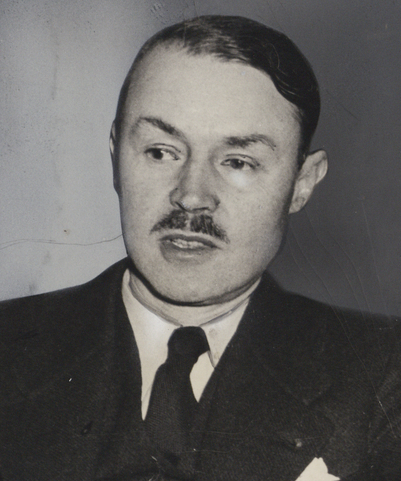
Maurice Genevoix, 1890-1980

Genevoix presided over the Friends of the Natural History Museum Paris society for ten years from 1970 to 1980.

== Tribute ==
The Académie française literary Prix Maurice Genevoix is named for him.

On 11 November 2020, Genevoix' remains were transferred to the Panthéon.

== See also ==
- Vaincre à Olympie
- Verdun Memorial
- Ceux de 14 (The Men of 1914).
