= Ronald Anthony Cross =

American novelist

Ronald Anthony Cross (September 12, 1937, Hollywood – March 1, 2006, Sherman Oaks, Los Angeles, California) was an American science fiction and fantasy author. He published his first science fiction story in 1973.

== Works ==
=== The Eternal Guardians ===
1. The Fourth Guardian, Tor Books, March 1994, ISBN 0-312-85634-2
2. The Lost Guardian, Tor Books, April 1995, ISBN 0-312-85862-0
  - Paperback edition: Tor Books, August 1996, ISBN 0-8125-1595-1
3. White Guardian, Tor Books, May 1998, ISBN 0-312-85863-9

=== Standalone novels ===
- Prisoners of Paradise, Franklin Watts, October 1988, ISBN 0-531-15083-6
