= The Church Mice series =

Children's book series

- Author: Graham Oakley
- Language: English
- Genre: Children's picture book
- Publisher: Atheneum, Macmillan, Hodder Children's
- Published: 1972--2000
- No. of books: 14

The Church Mice series is a series of children's picture books written by English writer Graham Oakley. The books focus on the adventures of a group of church mice who live in an old gothic church in the fictional town of Wortlethorpe, England (based on the real life Cambridge), and their guardian, Sampson the cat. The books have been widely praised for their richly detailed illustrations and their witty, ironic humor. Several of the church mice books have been nominated for or won major literary awards.

== Characters ==
In the first book in the series, The Church Mouse, readers are introduced to Arthur the church mouse, who lives in the Wortlethorpe church with his friend, Sampson the cat. Sampson, it is revealed, has sworn never to harm a mouse, having listened to many sermons on brotherly love and meekness while living in the church and taken their message to heart. Arthur soon invites more mice to live in the church due his loneliness. He earns the permission of the Parson by promising that the mice will do chores and odd jobs to earn their keep (in cheese). One particularly notable addition is Humphrey the school mouse, who becomes Arthur's good friend and co-leader of the church mice but is also something of a troublemaker.

Later books in the series recount the various adventures of Sampson and the church mice, as they travel abroad, defend the church from burglars, and attempt to raise money for the vestry roof through a number of different harebrained schemes. Throughout, the books focus on the relationships between Sampson, Arthur and Humphrey.

== Reception ==
Critics have often noted that the Church Mice books combine pictures and text in a particularly effective fashion. The Times Literary Supplement, for example, noted that Oakley shows "how effectively words and pictures can be crafted together, so that our understanding of the story depends on the two." In a review of The Church Mouse, Emma Milne-White noted that Oakley's "glorious illustrations are packed so full of detail and humor that something new is discovered with each reading...they complement the story beautifully." Other reviewers have commented on the strength of Oakley's "memorable characters, beautifully realized," and on the Church Mice books' ability to entertain both children and older readers simultaneously.

Several of the church mice books have been nominated for major awards. The Church Mice Adrift was a New York Times Best Illustrated Children's Book of the Year, and was nominated for a Kate Greenaway Medal in 1977. The Church Mice in Action was nominated for a Kate Greenaway Medal, and was a runner-up for the Kurt Maschler Award in 1982.

== Film adaptation ==
Live Oak Media created a direct-to-video film adaptation of The Church Mouse in 1988.

== List of Church Mice books ==
- The Church Mouse, Atheneum, 1972.
- The Church Cat Abroad, Atheneum, 1973.
- The Church Mice and the Moon, Atheneum, 1974.
- The Church Mice Spread Their Wings, Macmillan, 1975 and Atheneum, 1976.
- The Church Mice Adrift, Macmillan, 1976 and Atheneum, 1977.
- The Church Mice at Bay, Macmillan, 1978 and Atheneum, 1979.
- The Church Mice at Christmas, Atheneum, 1980.
- The Church Mice in Action, Macmillan, 1982, Atheneum, 1983.
- The Church Mice Chronicles (Contains The Church Mouse, The Church Cat Abroad, and The Church Mice and the Moon), Macmillan, 1986.
- The Church Mice Chronicles (Contains The Church Mice Spread Their Wings, The Church Mice Adrift, and The Church Mice At Bay), Macmillan, 1990.
- The Church Mice and the Ring, Atheneum, 1992.
- The Diary of a Church Mouse, Macmillan, 1986 and Atheneum, 1997.
- Humphrey Hits the Jackpot, Hodder Children's, 1998.
- The Church Mice Take a Break, Hodder Children's, 2000.

== Reoccurring characters ==
- Arthur - the original church mouse and co-leader, along with Humphrey
- Humphrey - co-leader of the church mice, also called the school mouse
- Sampson - the church cat who has sworn to protect the mice
- The Parson

== See also ==
- Graham Oakley
