= Mallinson Rendel =

New Zealand publisher (1980–2009)

Mallinson Rendel Publishers Limited was an independent publisher based in Wellington, New Zealand, founded in 1980. Founded by Ann Mallinson and David Rendel, it concentrated mainly on children's fiction and picture books and also published a small number of popular new titles each year. Works published include Lynley Dodd's Hairy Maclary series. In December 2009 the company's assets were acquired by Pearson New Zealand Ltd with most of the works being marketed under the Penguin imprint.

== Awards ==
Mallinson Rendel won numerous New Zealand Book Awards for Children and Young Adults.
