= Hairy Maclary from Donaldson's Dairy =

1983 children's book by Lynley Dodd

- Author: Lynley Dodd
- Language: English
- Series: Hairy Maclary
- Genre: Children's book
- Publisher: Mallinson Rendel Publishers Limited
- Publication date: 1983
- Publication place: New Zealand
- Pages: 32 (Paperback Edition); 36 (Hardcover and Board Book Editions)
- ISBN: 978-0-14-330615-3
- Followed by: Hairy Maclary's Bone

Hairy Maclary from Donaldson's Dairy first published in 1983, is the first and most well-known of a series of books by New Zealand author Dame Lynley Dodd featuring Hairy Maclary. His adventures are usually in the company of his other dog friends. His arch-enemy is the tomcat Scarface Claw.

Written for pre-school children, it has become a classic bedtime storybook in New Zealand and Australia, and Lynley Dodd's books, including this one, dominate the children's section of the Premier New Zealand Bestsellers list.

The order of introduction of the dogs (with their house number in brackets) is:

- Hairy Maclary (from Donaldson's Dairy), a Scottish Terrier, (60)
- Hercules Morse (as big as a horse), an English Mastiff, (54)
- Bottomley Potts (covered in spots), a Dalmatian, (52)
- Muffin McLay (like a bundle of hay), an Old English Sheepdog, (48)
- Bitzer Maloney (all skinny and bony), a Greyhound, (36)
- Schnitzel Von Krumm (with a very low tum), a Dachshund, (22)

The story follows the assembly of a pack of dogs going to the park, and ends when they are all scared off by a fearsome cat – Scarface Claw.

Like most of Dodd's books, it is written in anapaestic verse, though it breaks into a more urgent trochaic form when the dogs encounter the cat.

It has sold more than 11 million copies worldwide and been translated into Mandarin, Korean, Japanese, Swedish, Russian, Slovene – and te reo Māori. It has also been adapted into a stage play, which has been performed at the Edinburgh Fringe Festival and the Sydney Opera House.

In the 2019 TVNZ series Goodnight Kiwi, Prime Minister Jacinda Ardern read Hairy Maclary from Donaldson's Dairy. The episode aired on TVNZ 2 on Christmas Day.
