= Lynley Dodd =

NZ children's book author and illustrator

Dame Lynley Dodd DNZM
- Born: Lynley Stuart Dodd; 5 July 1941 (age 85); Rotorua, New Zealand
- Occupations: Writer, illustrator
- Relatives: Eve Sutton (cousin-in-law)
- Writing career
- Language: English
- Genres: Children's, picture books
- Notable works: Hairy Maclary from Donaldson's Dairy; My Cat Likes to Hide in Boxes
- Notable awards: Margaret Mahy Award

Dame Lynley Stuart Dodd DNZM (born 5 July 1941) is a New Zealand children's book author and illustrator. She is best known for her Hairy Maclary and Friends series, and its follow-ups, all of which feature animals with rhyming names and have sold over five million copies worldwide. In 1999, Dodd received the Margaret Mahy Award.

She was appointed a Distinguished Companion of the New Zealand Order of Merit in the 2002 New Year Honours, redesignated as a Dame Companion of the New Zealand Order of Merit in 2009.

== Life and career ==
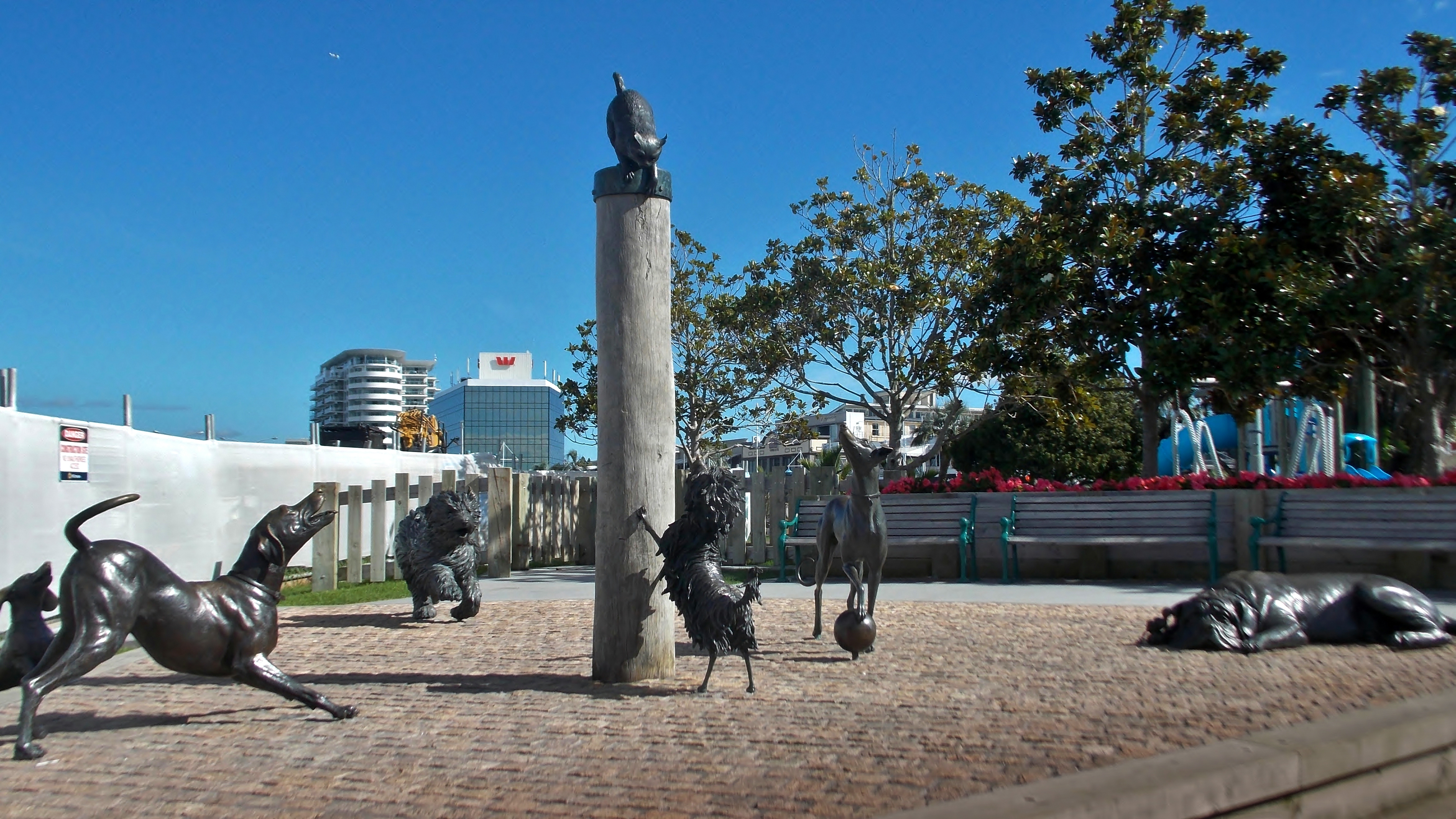
Sculpture of Hairy Maclary and other characters from the books in Tauranga, New Zealand on the waterfront.

Dodd was born in Rotorua in 1941. She was an only child and lived with her parents in Kaingaroa Forest, near Taupō. She was educated at Iwitahi School and Tauranga College. Dodd graduated from the Elam School of Art in Auckland with a diploma in Fine Arts, and became an art teacher spending five years teaching at Queen Margaret College in Wellington. While there she met her husband Tony; he died in 2014 after an illness. After their marriage she began to work as a freelance illustrator. Her first book was My Cat Likes To Hide In Boxes, published in 1974, which she wrote along with Eve Sutton. Her first book written solo was The Nickle Nackle Tree (1976).

In 1983 the first book in her Hairy Maclary series, Hairy Maclary from Donaldson's Dairy, was published. It was followed by Hairy Maclary’s Bone (1984), Hairy Maclary Scattercat (1985), Hairy Maclary's Caterwaul Caper (1987), Hairy Maclary's Rumpus at the Vet (1989) and Hairy Maclary's Showbusiness (1991). The first, third, fourth and sixth of these all won the New Zealand Children's Picture Book of the Year Award; the second and fifth were shortlisted but did not win. In 1997, Dodd was the screenwriter for a TV series based on the Hairy Maclary series featuring 10 five-minute episodes narrated by Miranda Harcourt. In 2005 her book The Other Ark won the Children’s Choice Award at the New Zealand Post Book Awards. In 2015 a waterfront sculpture of Hairy Maclary and other characters from the books was officially unveiled in Tauranga by former New Zealand prime minister John Key. In an episode of the TVNZ series Goodnight Kiwi, airing on 25 December 2019, the prime minister Jacinda Ardern read Hairy Maclary from Donaldson's Dairy. As of 2019 Dodd lived in Tauranga.

== Honours and awards ==
In 1990, Dodd was awarded the New Zealand 1990 Commemoration Medal. In 1999, she became the ninth recipient of the Margaret Mahy Award. She was appointed a Distinguished Companion of the New Zealand Order of Merit in the 2002 New Year Honours, for services to children's literature and book illustration. Following the re-introduction of titular honours by the New Zealand government, she accepted redesignation as a Dame Companion of the New Zealand Order of Merit in 2009. In 2024 she received the Prime Minister's Award for Literary Achievement.

== Books ==
- 1973 – My Cat Likes to Hide in Boxes
- 1976 – The Nickle Nackle Tree
- 1978 – Titimus Trim
- 1982 – The Apple Tree
- 1982 – The Smallest Turtle
- 1983 – Hairy Maclary from Donaldson's Dairy
- 1984 – Hairy Maclary's Bone
- 1985 – Hairy Maclary Scattercat
- 1986 – Wake Up, Bear
- 1987 – Hairy Maclary's Caterwaul Caper
- 1988 – A Dragon In A Wagon
- 1989 – Hairy Maclary's Rumpus at the Vet
- 1990 – Slinky Malinki
- 1991 – Find Me A Tiger
- 1991 – Hairy Maclary's Showbusiness
- 1992 – The Minister's Cat ABC
- 1993 – Slinky Malinki, Open The Door
- 1994 – Schnitzel von Krumm's Basketwork
- 1995 – Sniff-Snuff-Snap!
- 1996 – Schnitzel von Krumm Forget-Me-Not
- 1997 – Hairy Maclary, Sit
- 1998 – Slinky Malinki Catflaps
- 1999 – Hairy Maclary and Zachary Quack
- 2000 – Hedgehog Howdedo
- 2001 – Scarface Claw
- 2002 – Schnitzel von Krumm, Dogs Never Climb Trees
- 2004 – The Other Ark
- 2005 – Zachary Quack Minimonster
- 2006 – Where is Hairy Maclary?
- 2006 – Slinky Malinki's Christmas Crackers
- 2007 – Hairy Maclary's Hat Tricks
- 2008 – The Dudgeon is Coming
- 2009 – Hairy Maclary, Shoo
- 2012 – Slinky Malinki, Early Bird
- 2017 – Scarface Claw, Hold Tight!
- 2025 – Hairy Maclary's First 100 Words
- 2026 – Hairy Maclary's Hullabaloo
