= Tim Dixon =

Tim Dixon may refer to:

- Tim Dixon (presenter) (born 1984), English television presenter
- Tim Dixon (professor), British professor
