= Wayne Sleep =

British ballet dancer (born 1948)

Wayne Sleep OBE
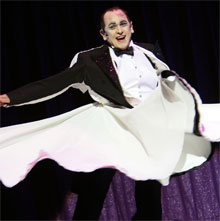
- Born: 17 July 1948 (age 78); Plymouth, Devon, England
- Occupations: Dancer; director; choreographer; actor
- Years active: 1966–present
- Spouse: José Bergera (m. 2008)
- Website: www.waynesleep.com

Wayne Philip Colin Sleep OBE (born 17 July 1948) is a British dancer, director, choreographer, and actor who appeared on the BBC series The Real Marigold on Tour and ITV's The Real Full Monty.

== Early life ==
Wayne Sleep was born in Plymouth, Devon. His mother enrolled him at an early age with Geraldine Lamb Dance School, where he studied tap and jazz, wanting to be the next Gene Kelly or Fred Astaire rather than a ballet dancer. He and his family moved to Hartlepool in around 1951 and spent ten years there. He lived at Friar Terrace on the Headland and attended Baltic Street Junior School. He began ballet lessons in Hartlepool in 1955 with Muriel Carr, before gaining a Leverhulme Scholarship to the Royal Ballet School in 1961 and joining the Royal Ballet in 1966 and becoming a senior principal dancer performing globally.

== Career ==
At 157 cm (5 ft 2 in), Sleep was the shortest male dancer admitted into the Royal Ballet School. Because of his diminutive stature, many directors were reluctant to cast him in traditional male lead roles. As a result, many roles were created for him by noted choreographers, including Frederick Ashton, Kenneth MacMillan, Ninette de Valois, Joe Layton, Rudolf Nureyev, Gillian Lynne and John Neumeier. Sleep is often chosen for character roles because of his unusual physique. In 1982, Andrew Lloyd Webber adapted his Variations album as the second half of stage show Song and Dance for Sleep. Sleep created the role of Mr. Mistoffelees in Lloyd Webber's musical Cats in London's West End at the New London Theatre on 11 May 1981.

In 1973, he established a world record by doing an entrechat-douze, a jump with 12 beats of the feet, on the British television programme Record Breakers. This record still stands. Sleep later jumped from an aircraft for charity, after being challenged by presenter Roy Castle who said: "I'm going to beat your record and you've got to beat mine for tap dancing (the most taps in one minute) – but on my terms"... the joke being that Castle was able to perform multiple entrechats while falling, whereas Sleep was unable to perform a single tap in mid-air.

=== Television ===
In 2003, Sleep appeared in the reality-TV series I'm a Celebrity... Get Me Out of Here!. He appeared as a judge on BBC One's Strictly Dance Fever, which ran between 2005 and 2006.

Sleep also appeared in the 2008 series of Ant & Dec's Saturday Night Takeaway as a team member in the feature "Ant v. Dec". On the first show, Ant's team lost the challenge which meant Ant had to choose one of the team members to be eliminated and chose Sleep.

In January 2011, Sleep featured on British reality cooking show Come Dine with Me, with presenter Terry Christian, Labour MP Diane Abbott and model Danielle Lloyd.

In August 2013, Sleep joined ITV's dance show, Stepping Out as a judge with Melanie Brown and Jason Gardiner. The show aired for one series.

On 5 January 2014, Sleep and his family went on the game show All Star Family Fortunes, playing against Girls Aloud member Kimberley Walsh.

In February 2014, Sleep appeared in the Channel 4 show Big Ballet about overweight ballet dancers. He finished fourth in the 2014 series of the BBC One cookery contest Celebrity MasterChef.

In 2015, he appeared in a celebrity edition of The Chase, a game show where he competed for charity.

Sleep also appeared in the BBC miniseries that followed a group of celebrity pensioners on a journey to India, The Real Marigold Hotel, broadcast from January to February in 2016. He appeared in subsequent episodes travelling to Florida and Japan in December 2016 and then China and Cuba in December 2017.

In 2017 he appeared in The Real Full Monty, celebrating the film The Full Monty's 20th anniversary and raising awareness for prostate and testicular cancer. He also appeared in the BBC's Queer as Art documentary celebrating the LGBTQ contribution to British arts in the 50 years since decriminalisation.

In January 2018 Sleep entered the British version of Celebrity Big Brother, making the final and finishing in fifth place.

=== Cinema ===
Sleep performed as an actor in The Virgin Soldiers (1969), The First Great Train Robbery (1979) and Elizabeth (1998).

He performed as a dancer in The Tales of Beatrix Potter (1971) as Squirrel Nutkin and Tom Thumb.

He directed the choreography of the tango scene in the 1978 film Death on the Nile.

=== Theatre ===
Sleep took the role of Puck in one of the early productions of Benjamin Britten's Shakespeare opera A Midsummer Night's Dream.

In 2009 Sleep appeared as the MC in Life is a Cabaret by the Birmingham Repertory Theatre, which presented excerpts from Cabaret, alongside Siobhan Dillon as Sally Bowles.

He appeared in 2019 in Cinderella at Cambridge Art's Theatre, Cambridgeshire

He appeared in 2016 in Jack and the Beanstalk at Theatre Royal, Norwich

=== Popular culture ===
Sleep is a subject in David Hockney's painting George Lawson and Wayne Sleep (1972–1975), which is exhibited at the Tate in London.

Sleep is mentioned in "Never Say Alan Again", an episode from the second series of I'm Alan Partridge. When Michael (Simon Greenall)'s Americanophile friend Tex (Peter Serafinowicz) mentions that "[my idol] has gotta be Wayne", Alan Partridge (Steve Coogan) mistakenly concludes he means Sleep. Tex tries to correct this misconception by drawling "Get on yer horse and drink yer milk" in an approximation of John Wayne's voice, but Alan is merely further confirmed in his belief that Sleep is the man to whom Tex is referring.

Sleep is mentioned numerous times in the film Billy Elliot and in the British stage musical version of this film. (On Broadway, references to Sleep were changed to Rudolf Nureyev.)

The diminutive and frizz-haired Green Wing character Martin Dear (played by Karl Theobald) refers to Sleep as the celebrity to whom he was most flattered to have his appearance compared.

In Sean Lock's 15 Storeys High, Sleep is one of several people to whom Lock's character Vince Clark addresses a letter.

In 2017, Sleep performed at Dame Vera Lynn's 100th birthday celebrations at the London Palladium.

In 2020, Sleep was portrayed by dancer Jay Webb in "Avalanche", a season 4 episode of the TV series The Crown, depicting Sleep's performance with Diana, Princess of Wales (Emma Corrin), at the Royal Opera House.

== Radio ==
In 2016, Sleep was the first artist to appear on BBC Radio 2's Friday Night Is Music Night, recorded live at the Watford Colosseum on Monday 10 October with BBC Concert Orchestra.

In 2017, he appeared on Clare Teal's BBC Radio 2 show.

On 26 February 2023, he was the subject of a broadcast in the Private Passions series on BBC Radio 3, discussing his personal and professional life interspersed with relevant musical recordings.

== Publications ==
Sleep published Variations on Wayne Sleep and his autobiography Precious Little Sleep.

== Personal life ==
Sleep is openly gay. He lives with his spouse José Bergera in West London.

Sleep received honorary degrees from the Universities of Exeter, Teesside and Plymouth and is a recipient of the Carl Alan Award, an industry honour voted for by dance professionals in recognition of outstanding contributions to dance.

Sleep was friendly with theatre critic Jack Tinker; the two men were often mistaken for each other. At the premiere of a production of The Comedy of Errors, a play which depends on sets of identical twins being confused for one another, Tinker brought an identically dressed Sleep as his companion. At Tinker's memorial celebration, a pastiche of Stephen Sondheim's musical Sweeney Todd was staged entitled Tinker Jack, the Demon Critic of Fleet Street in which Sleep played Tinker, serially executing several major West End producers (who played themselves) for inflicting particular dramatic atrocities upon the city's theatre goers.

His charity, the Wayne Sleep Foundation, helps students who have successfully gained a place at a performing arts vocational college. He continues to pass his knowledge through private tuition and workshops for all ages.

Sleep is a patron of the British Ballet Organisation and vice president of the Royal Academy of Dance. He is vice president of the Vic-Wells Association.

Sleep is an ambassador for Prostate Cancer UK and the Royal Voluntary Service as well as supporting the Terrence Higgins Trust and other charities.
