= VWA =

VWA is a three-letter abbreviation that may refer to:

- Vaccination Week In The Americas, a public health campaign to promote equitable access to immunization.
- Victorian Workcover Authority, a statutory authority of the state government of Victoria, Australia.
- Volga Wrestling Assembly, an indie professional wrestling federation in Nizhny Novgorod, RF.
- Volkswagen Anhui, a Chinese automotive manufacturing joint venture established by JAC Motors and Volkswagen.
- Vic-Wells Association, an online association which supports the work of the Old Vic and Sadler's Wells theatres in London.
