= Tricky TV =

2005–2010 British television series

- Presented by: Stephen Mulhern
- Country of origin: United Kingdom
- Original language: English
- No. of series: 3
- No. of episodes: 43

Production
- Running time: 30 minutes
- Production company: The Foundation

Original release
- Network: ITV (CITV)
- Release: 5 September 2005 – 15 October 2010

Related
- The Quick Trick Show

Tricky TV is a British television show that aired on CITV from 2005 to 2010, presented by magician Stephen Mulhern. The show featured street magic, pranks, illusions, and step-by-step how-to guides for magic tricks.

== Format ==
The show featured magic tricks such as making a tank vanish or making an entire football team appear. The "wicked wind-ups" segment included a gorilla that came to life, a cinema with exploding popcorn, and unstoppable drinks machines. "Beat the Cheat" exposed classic confidence tricks. Each show usually closed with a performance of a classic "grand illusion", such as sawing a woman in half.

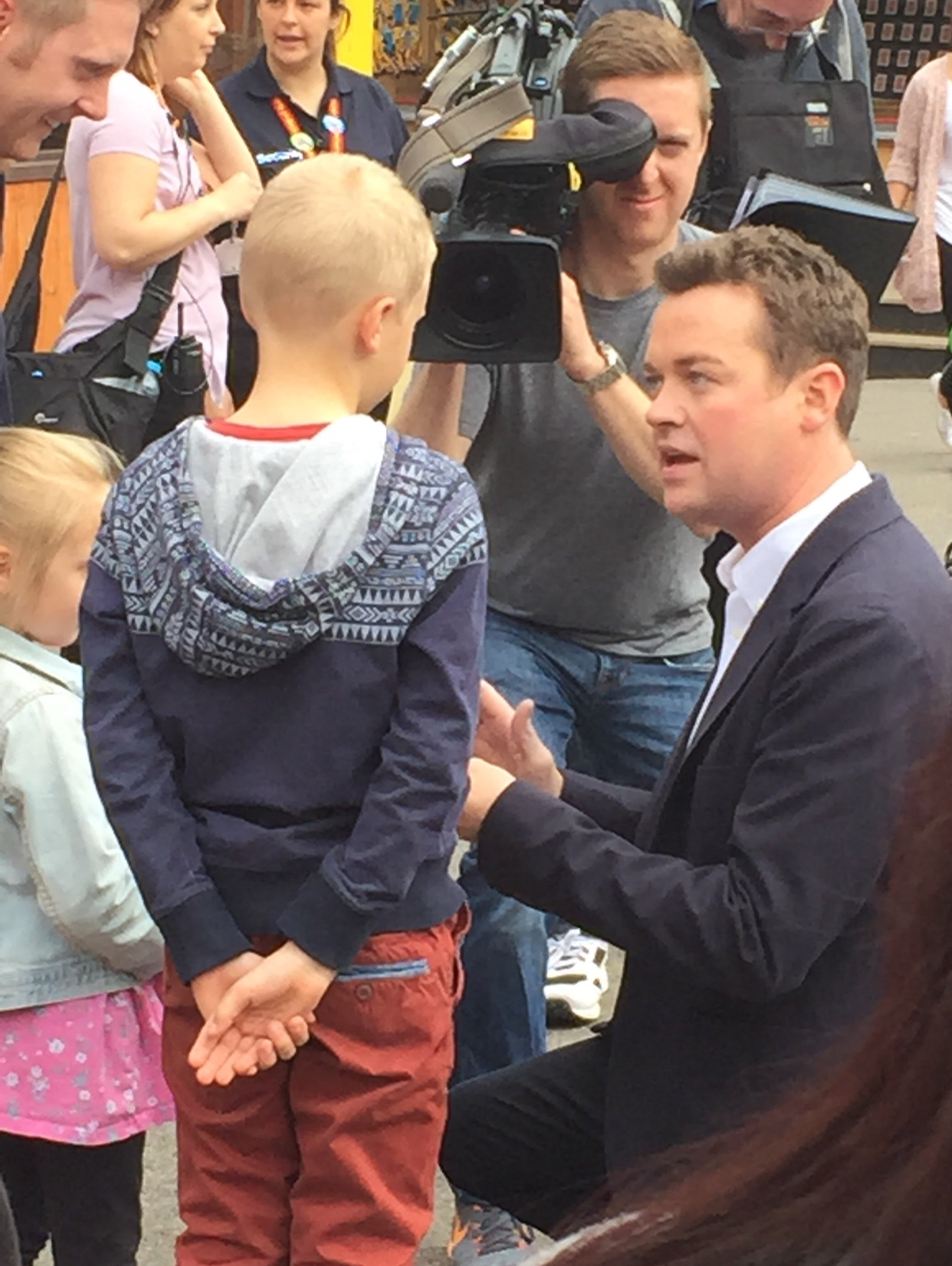
Mulhern performing a magic trick to a child at Chessington World of Adventures during filming of the show.

In Series 1 and 2, each episode featured one or more special guest celebrities, who often took part in a number of tricks during the show, and sometimes participated in the show's closing illusion. In series 3, the format was redesigned with Mulhern presenting and a 'Tricky Team' of young magicians performing the illusions.

== Production ==
Tricky TV was first broadcast in the 4pm slot on ITV from 5 September 2005.

The show was produced by The Foundation, the same company that produced Finger Tips, Globo Loco and Holly & Stephen's Saturday Showdown, which also starred Stephen Mulhern.

The show featured frequent appearances by celebrities, and used glamour models and bodybuilders as magician's assistants. It was also noted for featuring viewers or their mothers in tricks.

The creative consultant was Paul Andrews. The show's executive producer was Vanessa Hill for The Foundation. Series 2 was produced by Ian France and directed by Paul Andrews (magician). Series 3 was co-produced, written and directed by Paul Andrews.

== Transmissions ==
Series	First aired	Last aired	Episodes
1	5 September 2005	13 November 2005	10
2	10 March 2006	2 June 2006	13
3	14 September 2010	15 October 2010	20

== Episodes ==
=== Series 1 ===
Series 1 consisted of ten episodes, and ran from 5 September 2005 to 7 November 2005.

Episode	In series	Original air date	Special guest	Episode details
1	1	5 September 2005	Jennifer Ellison	A full-sized model gorilla comes to life, and Mulhern causes a school class's teacher to vanish. Ellison is amazed by a card trick, and then cut into three in the "Zigzag Girl".
2	2	12 September 2005		In this episode's big trick, Stephen flattened a schoolboy called Josh by squeezing his body through two rollers in a wringer illusion. Mulhern also attempts to make a tank disappear, and then leads a cookery class that descends into chaos.
3	3	19 September 2005	Caprice	Mulhern demonstrates the illusion of levitation, customers at an ice-cream van are served a surprise, and in the closing illusion, Caprice participates in a giant card trick.
4	4	26 September 2005	The Cheeky Girls	In this episode, the Cheeky Girls help Mulhern perform a trick with playing cards by sitting on them. Mulhern also demonstrates a trick where a handkerchief turns into an egg. Finally, a viewer's mother agrees to be sliced up and sent by post.
5	5	3 October 2005	Bradley Walsh	In this episode, Bradley Walsh is amazed by a football-related card trick; Mulhern transforms a viewer's old family car; a poster comes to life; a harmless toy terrifies members of the public; and a viewer asks Mulhern to use their mother in a dangerous feat.
6	6	10 October 2005	Rachel Stevens	In this episode, magic is involved in a school trip to the cinema, and Mulhern performs a trick involving Rachel Stevens's expensive ring, and then saws her in half while she is standing up. Mulhern also places a bodybuilder on the Table of Death to be impaled by a bed of sharp spikes falling from above.
7	7	17 October 2005	Joe Pasquale	In this episode, comedian Joe Pasquale plays a version of Russian roulette, Stephen tries to turn a pack of cub scouts into brownies, and Holly is sent to the guillotine.
8	8	24 October 2005	Peter Andre	Singer Peter Andre receives a shock when the presenter attempts a trick using a fork, Mulhern shows the secret to making someone levitate, and there is a big trick with a plane.
9	9	31 October 2005		Mulhern visits a sleepover to show a sleeping levitation, rescues a cat with magic, and shows off the secrets of a haunted house.
10	10	17 October 2005	Jack Osbourne and Louise Redknapp	Mulhern presents a trick with a box of tissues, guest Jack Osbourne receives some unusual help to overcome his jet-lag, and a bodybuilder volunteers for a dangerous underwater trick.

=== Series 2 ===
Series 2 ran from 10 March – 2 June 2006

Episode	In series	Original airdate	Special guest	Episode details
11	1	10 March 2006	Jennifer Ellison	Mulhern visits Blackpool beach; Holly appears from nowhere, and then uses a magical changing room to put on her bikini. In the closing illusion, Mulhern uses a bodybuilder to demonstrate the "Beach BBQ" to Holly.
12	2	17 March 2006	Jennifer Ellison	It is revealed how magicians make ice cream; and a donkey gets a ride. In the closing illusion, Holly and Jennifer go to pieces in the 'Bikini Blocks'.
13	3	24 March 2006	David Beckham	In this episode, Mulhern makes Holly's wedding ring vanish from inside her closed hand and then reappear inside a rose. He also brings a David Beckham waxwork to life, and then makes a horse disappear.
14	4	31 March 2006	Nikki Sanderson	Mulhern takes a knight to pieces in a suit of armour, amazes Nikki Sanderson with a trick with a bottle, and brings some magic to a library.
15	5	7 April 2006	Phillip Schofield	Mulhern amazes Phillip Schofield with a close up magic trick, shows off his magic picnic basket, and then makes a viewer's mother float high in the air above London.
16	6	14 April 2006		On Blackpool beach, Mulhern makes someone's aunt vanish. A card trick becomes a donkey trick. Aunty Linsey reappears in a tank of water. Beat the Cheat shares another secret. Aunty Linsey is penetrated by light-bulbs.
17	7	21 April 2006		A bodybuilder is squeezed through a tiny hole, heavy weights become weightless, and a gymnastics coach's body disappears, leaving just her head and legs.
18	8	28 April 2006		Mulhern uses a small tree house for a Big Trick and teaches magic in the Secret Circle. He also visits a gym and stretches and squashes a bodybuilder to impossible sizes in "The Stretcher".
19	9	5 May 2006		Mulhern introduces Holly to his idea of "Modern Art" when he saws her in half while she is standing up.
20	10	12 May 2006		Mulhern attends a school in Denbigh and puts a schoolgirl called Sophie through an illusion called the Wringer where she is flattened. At a gym in London, he performs Bodybuilder Bisection, using a buzzsaw to slice the man in half.
21	11	19 May 2006		Mulhern pushes javelins through a gym teacher, a classic confidence trick is exposed in Beat the Cheat, and a French lesson is cut short by a guillotine.
22	12	26 May 2006		Mulhern surprises a viewer's mother with some conjuring, and helps her dress the part, before she participates in an illusion with pirates. There are magic tips for viewers in the Secret Circle, and Mulhern's volunteer assistant is cut into nine in an illusion called "The Slicer".
23	13	2 June 2006		In "Girl Through Glass", Mulhern pushes Holly through a solid pane of glass, and also cuts her in half.

=== Series 3 ===
Series 3 consisted of twenty episodes, and ran from 14 September – 15 October 2010. Episodes 1-14 were presented by Stephen Williams.

Episode	In series	Original airdate	Special guest	Episode details
24	1	14 September 2010	Girls Aloud	Girls Aloud join Mulhern at the seaside, and take part in some magic. Mulhern's apprentices demonstrate their skills.
25	2	15 September 2010	Nell McAndrew	Sporty magic with special guest Nell McAndrew
26	3	16 September 2010		
27	4	17 September 2010		
28	5	21 September 2010		
29	6	22 September 2010		
30	7	23 September 2010		
31	8	24 September 2010		
32	9	28 September 2010		
33	10	29 September 2010		
34	11	30 September 2010		
35	12	1 October 2010		
36	13	5 October 2010		
37	14	6 October 2010		
38	15	7 October 2010		
39	16	8 October 2010		
40	17	12 October 2010		
41	18	13 October 2010		
42	19	14 October 2010		
43	20	15 October 2010		

== Tricky Quickies ==
Tricky Quickies was a cut-down version of the show with a duration of five minutes. Series 1 had 10 episodes, while series 2 had 15 episodes.

== The Quick Trick Show ==
The Quick Trick Show was the predecessor to Tricky TV, also presented by Mulhern, and also featuring magic tricks, "wicked wind-ups", illusions, and step-by-step guides to tricks. Five series were produced and aired on CITV between 1999 and 2002.

=== Series Guide ===
Series	Premiere	Last in series	Episodes
1	13 April 1999	18 May 1999	6
2	23 February 2000	5 April 2000	7
3	27 February 2001	20 March 2001	13
4	24 September 2001	11 October 2001	13
5	16 October 2002	18 December 2002	10

== International broadcasts ==
Tricky TV was aired in Southeast Asia on Cartoon Network Asia, in Germany on Super RTL, in the Arab World on MBC 3, MBC 4, MBC Action, MBC+ Variety, Space Power TV in Iran on MBC Persia, Iceland on Stöð 2, in Norway on NRK Super, in Canada on VRAK.TV, in India on Nickelodeon, in Hong Kong on ATV World and in Japan on Disney XD.
