= Tim Dixon (presenter) =

English television presenter

- Born: 19 February 1984 (age 42)
- Occupations: Television Presenter; Television Producer
- Website: Management website

Tim Dixon (born 19 February 1984) is an English television presenter who rose to prominence in 2003. In 2005 he was described by Flextech as "The best young up-and-coming television presenting talent in the UK".

== Education ==
Dixon was educated at Devonport High School for Boys, a grammar school in Plymouth, between 1995 and 2002.

== Early magical career ==
Dixon was, upon joining in 1995, the youngest ever member of the Plymouth Magic Circle. He made numerous appearances in Plymouth performing close-up magic in bars, restaurants and at private functions.

Dixon won the Grant Cup competition in 1997, for a close-up act which he collaborated on with Dominic Wood. The same act later saw Dixon come second in the international finals of the Young Close-Up Magician of the Year Awards, run by The Young Magician's Club – the youth initiative of The Magic Circle. The media exposure that followed included a guest appearance on The Disney Channel, in 1999. Soon after, Dixon was appointed Disney's "resident magician" and continued to make regular appearances on Studio Disney until 2001.

Dixon famously performed magic on Freddy Fresh and Fatboy Slim's hit single "Badder Badder Schwing", in 1999. Dixon performed a number of magic tutorials for AOL in 2006

== Television and radio career ==
Tim Dixon is a British television presenter/producer and managing director of a media company. Tim made his television debut on The Disney Channel (UK)'s "Sword and Sorcery Weekend" in early 1999.

Soon after he was selected to star in a four-minute pop video, performing magic, for "Badder Badder Schwing" by Freddy Fresh and Fatboy Slim. The music video was released in 12 countries across the globe and went on to reach number 34 in the UK Singles Chart in 1999, with further successes abroad, most notably in America. The video also featured on BBC1's The Ozone, ITV1's Clubber Vision, MTV and The Box.

Dixon soon became a regular face on Studio Disney and made numerous appearances over the next three years. He also represented Disney at several corporate events including Pop 2000 at the Birmingham NEC and toured the country as part of Disney's BAFTA-winning Kids Awards Roadshows in 2000 and 2001 – appearing in shows in Birmingham, Manchester, Cardiff, Reading, Edinburgh, Glasgow, Leeds, Coventry, and Croydon.

He then went on to front CITV in 2003, making his first appearance on 3 January – as part of CITV's 20th Birthday celebrations. He also appeared as a guest on ITV's flagship Saturday morning show SM:TV Live.

After some time spent working in radio (Plymouth Sound FM, BBC Radio 5 Live Fun Kids, BBC Radio Devon), within a production capacity in the independent sector (Twofour Productions) and presenting on satellite channels, in 2006 Tim was invited to make his return to ITV as part of the presenting launch team for ITV Play, in Manchester.

Over the next twelve months he hosted a shows including This Morning Puzzle Book, Play DJ, Friends Reunited: The School Run (between March and September 2006), and The Common Room (September–December 2006).

In 2007 Dixon became a celebrity interviewer and red-carpet roving reporter for Box Office Boys, BFBS.

Summer 2008 saw Dixon land arguably his biggest break to date – replacing Stephen Mulhern as the new presenter of 30 episodes of the children's make-and-do show Finger Tips – which was transmitted from early September on ITV1, the CITV Channel and Super RTL in Germany.

In 2009 Dixon was invited to become the main anchor host and content producer for all BFBS Television's children's output, fronting Room 785 (a live, studio-based format, broadcast every weekday afternoon and Saturday morning) and Telly-Tots (BFBS's early morning breakfast show aimed at a pre-school audience). On 2 May 2009, Tim became the face of BFBS 3 Kids – a new channel dedicated to the children of the armed forces.

2010 saw Dixon presenting numerous corporate events including Marketing Week Live at London's Olympia Exhibition Centre, fronting a family gameshow for ITV – due to form the centerpiece of ITV's new online natural history archive, itvWILD, fronting various online productions and making his panto debut at the Bournemouth Pavilion Theatre, as Prince Charming in Cinderella.

== Production company ==
Dixon has worked extensively within television production; recent roles have included those of a Production Manager for Discovery, a Live Gallery Producer for ITV and as part of UKTV's Commissioning Team. Whilst not presenting, he manages his own independent production company, Inside Media Group.

== Personal life ==
Dixon is married to '90s television presenter Emma Lee.
