= Rolling In It =

British game show

- Genre: Game show
- Presented by: Stephen Mulhern
- Country of origin: United Kingdom
- Original language: English
- No. of series: 2
- No. of episodes: 14

Production
- Production location: Dock10
- Running time: 60 minutes (inc. adverts)
- Production company: Over The Top Productions

Original release
- Network: ITV
- Release: 8 August 2020 – 18 December 2021

Rolling In It is a British game show that aired on ITV from 8 August 2020 to 18 December 2021 and was hosted by Stephen Mulhern.

== Gameplay ==
=== Main game ===
Three teams compete, each consisting of a celebrity and a civilian contestant. Resembling the "Roll-A-Win" arcade game commonly found in the United Kingdom, the centrepiece of the studio is a wide and slowly moving conveyor belt. At one end is a launcher loaded with giant coins that pivots from side to side; the other has a trough whose 10 slots display values/effects that can change during the game. Pressing a button on top of the launcher releases one coin to roll along the conveyor, and the result is determined by the slot into which it falls. The two outermost slots are marked "Roll Again," which allow another roll with no effect on gameplay, and do not change throughout the game.

The host starts the game by rolling one coin to determine the initial amount of each team's bank. For this roll, the centre eight slots display values of £1,000, £2,500 or £5,000. Fifteen questions are asked during the main game, each with three answer options, and one team is chosen at random to have initial control.

The team in control rolls a coin; if it lands in a money slot, the host asks a question. A correct answer adds the value to the team's bank and allows them to either roll another coin, or pass control to the next team in line. An incorrect answer ends their turn and gives control to the next team.

The centre eight slots are shuffled before the first, fourth, seventh, tenth, thirteenth and fifteenth questions. Penalty slots appear at times, which end the team's turn without a question being asked and also have the following effects:

- Bankrupt: Resets the bank to zero.
- Half: Cuts the bank in half.
- Minus: Deducts the indicated amount (£2,500 or £5,000) from the bank.

Slot values increase during the game, with the maximum rising to £25,000 by the final question. "Steal" slots also come into play, allowing a team to take all the money from one opponent's bank if they answer correctly.

After the last question has been asked, the team with the highest bank advances to the Bank Roll for a chance to win it. In the event of a tie, the first team to roll a coin into a money slot and correctly answer a question will advance, with the amount of the roll added to their bank.

The maximum potential bank is £142,500, obtainable if the host's initial roll lands on £5,000 and a single team keeps control throughout the entire game and hits the highest available amount on every roll.

=== Bank Roll ===
All of the slots except for the two "Roll Again" are blanked out, and the team is given 60 seconds to answer as many open-ended questions as possible. The members may confer, but only answers from the contestant are accepted. Each correct answer or wrong answer/pass marks a slot as "WIN" or "LOSE" respectively, working from left to right. After all eight slots have been marked, the team may continue answering questions and turn a "LOSE" into a "WIN" for each correct answer.

Once time runs out, the team rolls one coin. The contestant wins the entire bank if it lands in "WIN" or nothing if it lands in "LOSE."

== Transmissions ==
Series	Start date	End date	Episodes
1	8 August 2020	5 September 2020	5
2	10 July 2021	11 September 2021	9
2	18 December 2021		9

== International versions ==
Country	Local title	Channel	Presenter(s)	Premiere date
Germany	Rolling – Das Quiz mit der Münze	Sat.1	Ross Antony	May 10, 2021
Philippines	Rolling In It Philippines	TV5	Yassi Pressman	June 5, 2021
Saudi Arabia	Rolling In It Bil Arabi	Al Saudiya	Hisham Abdulrahman	September 18, 2021
