= Emma Lee =

- Born: Emma Lee
- Occupation: Television presenter
- Years active: 1993–present

Emma Lee is a television presenter and former catwalk model, she has presented productions which have gone on to receive RTS and BAFTA recognition and has presented on GMTV and ITV1's The Zone.

== Presenting career ==
After appearing in modelling appearing in campaigns, Lee made her television debut on Channel 4's Watch This Space, where the nation voted for her to front her very own live youth magazine show.

Television credits include RTS-nominated Reactive and The Friday Zone for BBC1, The Big Breakfast for Channel 4 and Nickelodeon,

Lee lives in London with husband, television presenter Tim Dixon – with whom she manages a production company and interactive agency called Insidemedia.

=== Credits ===
- Watch This Space Presenter of interactive magazine for Channel 4
- Reactive Show dedicated to computer games and competitions for CBBC.
- Telegantic Megavision Saturday morning show for ITV1.
- Reach For The Top Documentary programme for BBC One
- Technik Factual science show for young viewers on Nickelodeon UK
- Friday Zone hour long show of sketches and competitions.
- Pulling Power Entertainment motoring programme for Carlton Central
- You'll Never Believe It!, ITV1.
- Disney Channel Kids Awards (Yearly) BAFTA winning live award ceremony, for Disney Channel UK, Sky One, and Channel Five
- Studio Disney / Disney Channel presenter Live weekday show.
- "The National Lottery", presenter, 2007
- Virgin Sports News news anchor, 2008–2009
- "Sky Movies" presenter, 2009
- The Fluffy Club (GMTV) presenter, 2010
- "The Zone ITV1" presenter, 2010
- "Planet Wild", ITV, family gameshow – 2010
- "Jackpot247.com", Freeview ch39 – 2012
- William Hill Casino TV, CSJHDN TV, 2025, with Alfie Deyes and Kerry Newell.
