= Go for It (game show) =

- Genre: Game show
- Created by: John de Mol
- Presented by: Stephen Mulhern
- Narrated by: Bruce Hammal
- Theme music composer: Marc Sylvan; Richard Jacques
- Country of origin: United Kingdom
- Original language: English
- No. of series: 1
- No. of episodes: 6 (inc. 1 special)

Production
- Production location: The London Studios
- Running time: 60 minutes (inc. adverts)
- Production companies: Talpa and Potato

Original release
- Network: ITV
- Release: 27 August – 10 December 2016

Go for It is a British game show that was broadcast on ITV in 2016 for one series and was hosted by Stephen Mulhern.

The series returned on 10 December 2016 for a one-off special, with members of the public who thought they could do better than the previous acts. Some new challenges were also included. In 2017, it was reported that the show had been cancelled after one series.

== Format ==
The programme sees challengers putting their unusual skills and implausible party tricks to the test. If the challenger succeeds, they win £1,000.

Contestants included comedian Jay Foreman, who successfully named the most efficient route for ten London Underground journeys in ninety seconds.

== Background ==
The format of the show is derived from the television series Challenge Me, which has been produced in various countries including the United States, Netherlands, and Ukraine. In May 2016, ITV announced the commissioning of a new skill-based game show called Go for it, which was based on the format of Challenge Me. Initially, ITV used application forms with the working title Challenge Me! but the title was subsequently changed in May 2016.
