= Strictly Dance Fever =

- Developed by: BBC
- Starring: Graham Norton
- Country of origin: United Kingdom
- No. of series: 2

Production
- Running time: 60 minutes

Original release
- Network: BBC One
- Release: 26 March 2005 – 3 June 2006

Strictly Dance Fever was a British television programme, broadcast on BBC One on Saturday evenings. It was an amateur dance talent competition, hosted by Graham Norton, which ran during Spring 2005 and Spring 2006. It was accompanied by two extra BBC Three shows, the Saturday night show was hosted by Zoe Ball and the nightly roundup and fanzine programme by Joe Mace.

It was, in many ways, similar to the BBC's popular Strictly Come Dancing, a celebrity based dance contest also broadcast on Saturday evenings. On 12 December 2006, the BBC announced that Strictly Dance Fever had been axed in favour of the Andrew Lloyd Webber talent search, How Do You Solve a Problem Like Maria?.

== Broadcast ==
Strictly Dance Fever was normally broadcast during BBC One's Spring schedule. The auditions ran for two weeks. The recalls ran for two weeks as in the auditions. Finally, the dance-offs, ran for eight weeks, this time though live. The final edition aired in June, where the ultimate winning couple was revealed.

== Format ==
The maximum score for one dance, 40 points, has been achieved seven times throughout the series. Danny Last and Jodie Binstead (series 1 twice), Joseph Hall and Sadie Flower (series 1 once), Darren Bailey and Lana Williams (series 2 once) and then to Darrien Wright and Hollie Robertson (series 2 three times). Additionally, in the semi-final of series 2 Darren Bailey and Lana Williams were awarded a perfect 30 out of 30, when Stacey Haynes was ill. The lowest score achieved was 12, by Paul James Culshaw and Aravon McCann (series 2 once).

== Presenters and Judges ==
=== Presenters ===
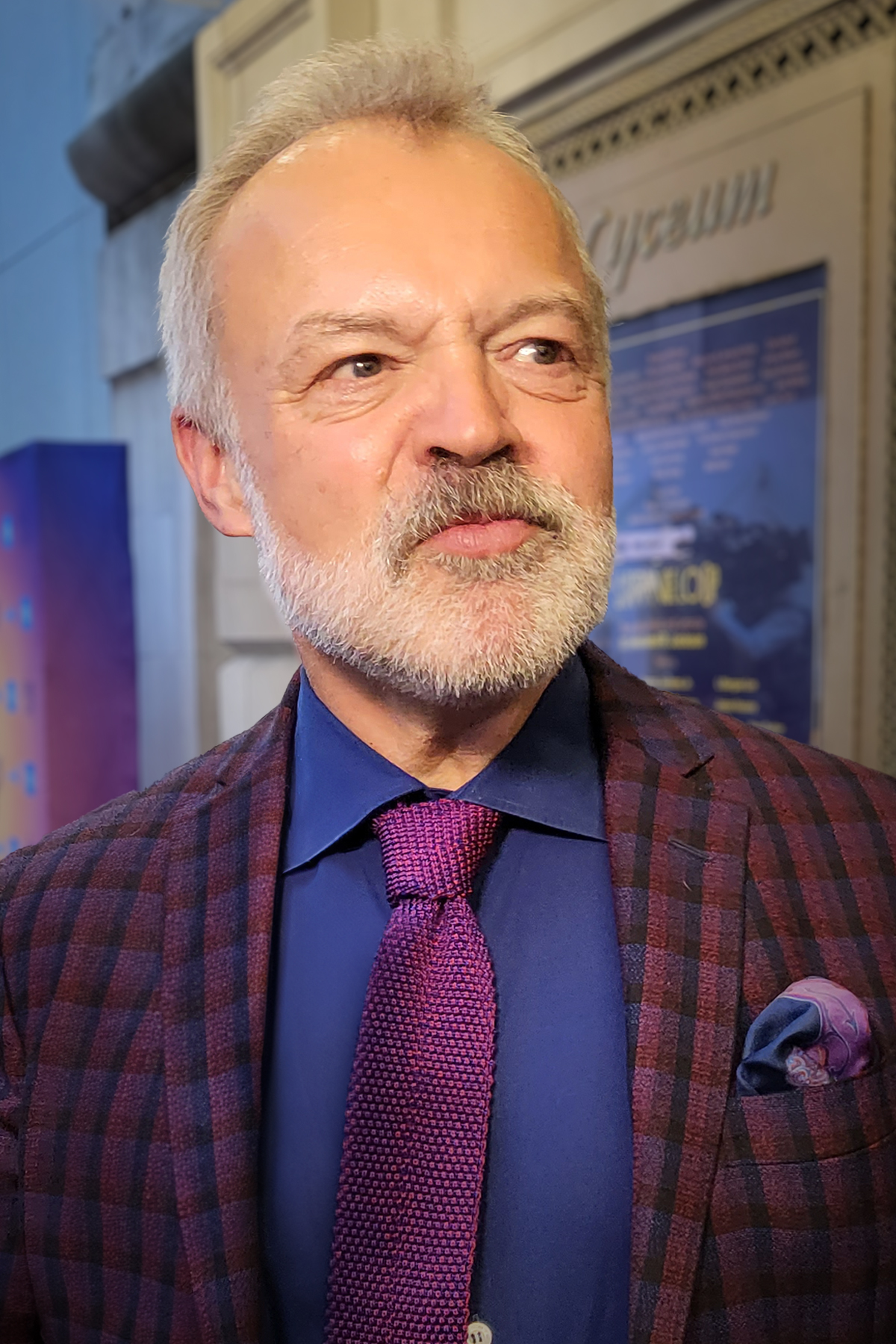
Comedian & broadcaster Graham Norton was the series' main presenter.

Colour Key:

Main Presenter
Strictly Dance Fever on Three Presenter

| Presenter | Series | |
| Presenter | 1 | 2 |
|---|---|---|
| Graham Norton | | |
| Zoe Ball | | |
| June Sarpong | | |
| Joe Mace | | |

=== Judges ===
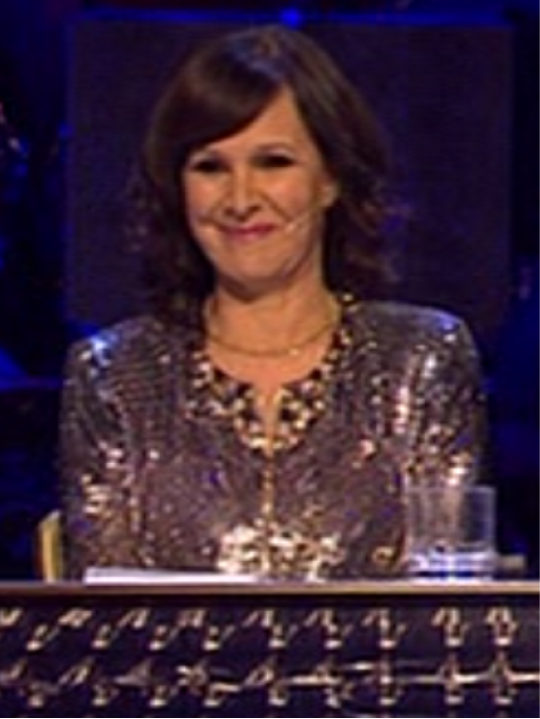
Theatre director & choreographer Arlene Phillips was the permanent head judge.

Colour Key:

Head Judge
Judge

| Judge | Series | |
| Judge | 1 | 2 |
|---|---|---|
| Arlene Phillips | | |
| Stacey Haynes | | |
| Luca Tommassini | | |
| Jason Gardiner | | |
| Ben Richards | | |
| Wayne Sleep | | |

== Series 1 ==
Series 1 of Strictly Dance Fever first aired on 26 March 2005. There were ten couples competing in the first series. The show was presented by Graham Norton, and the main judges throughout the shows were Strictly Come Dancing judge and choreographer Arlene Phillips, and choreographer Stacey Haynes. They were then joined for the finals by Italian dancer, director and actor Luca Tommassini, and Australian dancer, choreographer, singer and theatre producer Jason Gardiner, the latter of whom would later become the snide judge on ITV's Dancing on Ice.

The auditions were separated into three: The North, Midlands and Wales and The South. After the end of the South auditions, there was a wildcard round, featuring three couples from each audition location. From this wildcard round, Adam & Rebecca qualified for the finals.

The lowest individual score given by a judge during this series was '3', given twice by Arlene Phillips. This would change in Series 2 however, when the lowest individual score would be a '2' given also by Phillips.

=== Dance chart ===
| Team | Week 1 | Week 2 | Week 3 | Week 4 | Week 5 | Week 6 | Week 7 | Week 8 Final |
|---|---|---|---|---|---|---|---|---|
| Joseph & Sadie | Cuban Salsa | Argentine Tango | Charleston | Lindyhop | Mambo | Milonga, Dirty Dancing | Waltz, Hustle | Lindyhop, Showdance |
| Danny & Jodie | Boogie Woogie | Argentine Tango | Lambada | Jitterbug | Mambo | Milonga, Top Hat | Waltz, Charleston | Milonga, Showdance |
| James & Claire | Cuban Salsa | Hustle | Charleston | Foxtrot | Mambo | Milonga, Sound of Music | Waltz, Jitterbug | Cuban Salsa, Showdance |
| Nathan & Kristy | Boogie Woogie | Argentine Tango | Lambada | Jitterbug | IN | Milonga, Bandwagon | Waltz, Lindyhop | Eliminated |
| Cem & Gemma | Cuban Salsa | Argentine Tango | Charleston | Lindyhop | Mambo | Milonga, Saturday Night Fever | Eliminated | |
| Adam & Rebecca | Boogie Woogie | Hustle | Lambada | Foxtrot | Mambo | Eliminated | | |
| Paul & Natasha | Cuban Salsa | Hustle | Charleston | Foxtrot | Eliminated | | | |
| Toby & Casey | Cuban Salsa | Hustle | Lambada | Eliminated | | | | |
| Alex & Katie | Boogie Woogie | Hustle | Eliminated | | | | | |
| Dan & Michelle | Boogie Woogie | Eliminated | | | | | | |

=== Scoring Chart ===
Bold scores indicate the highest for that week. Red indicates the lowest score. * means this couple was in the bottom 2. IN means they did not dance due to an injury.

| Team | Week 1 | Week 2 | Week 3 | Week 4 | Week 5 | Week 6 | Week 7 | Week 8 Final |
|---|---|---|---|---|---|---|---|---|
| Joseph/Sadie | 27 | 33 | 35 | 36 | 26 | 34+36=70 | 20+38=58 | 40+39=79 |
| Danny/Jodie | 28 | 34 | 31 | 29 | 34 | 38+36=74 | 34+40=74 | 40+31=71 |
| James/Claire | 32 | 28 | 29 | 28 | 24 | 25+30=55 | 32+21=53* | 36+34=70 |
| Nathan/Kristy | 34 | 22 | 22* | 34 | IN | 22+23=45* | 29+35=64* | Eliminated |
| Cem/Gemma | 29 | 29 | 38 | 29 | 30* | 26+24=50* | Eliminated | |
| Adam/Rebecca | 25 | 31 | 20 | 18* | 20* | Eliminated | | |
| Paul/Natasha | 17 | 24 | 23 | 17* | Eliminated | | | |
| Toby/Casey | 24 | 18* | 24* | Eliminated | | | | |
| Alex/Katie | 21* | 24* | Eliminated | | | | | |
| Dan/Michelle | 26* | Eliminated | | | | | | |

=== Average Chart ===
This chart is based on the dancers' averages and not their place in the competition.

| Couple | Rank by average | Total points | Number of dances | Total average |
|---|---|---|---|---|
| Danny & Jodie | 1st | 375 | 11 | 34.1 |
| Sadie & Joseph | 2nd | 364 | 11 | 33.1 |
| Cem & Gemma | 3rd | 205 | 7 | 29.3 |
| James & Claire | 4th | 319 | 11 | 29.0 |
| Kristy & Nathan | 5th | 221 | 8 | 27.6 |
| Dan & Michelle | 6th | 26 | 1 | 26.0 |
| Adam & Rebecca | 7th | 114 | 5 | 22.8 |
| Alex & Katie | 8th | 45 | 2 | 22.5 |
| Toby & Casey | 9th | 66 | 3 | 22.0 |
| Paul & Natasha | 10th | 81 | 4 | 20.3 |

== Finals Summary ==
=== Weekly Scores ===
Individual judges' scores in the chart below (given in parentheses) are listed in this order from left to right: Arlene Phillips, Luca Tommassini, Stacey Haynes, Jason Gardiner.

=== Week 1 ===
For this week, the couples performed either a Boogie Woogie or Cuban Salsa.

Couples are listed in the order they performed.

| Couple | Scores | Dance | Music | Result |
|---|---|---|---|---|
| Danny & Jodie | 28 (6, 8, 7, 7) | Boogie Woogie | "Reet Petite" – Jackie Wilson | Safe |
| Joseph & Sadie | 27 (7, 7, 6, 7) | Cuban Salsa | "[[]]" – [[]] | Safe |
| Adam & Rebecca | 25 (5, 9, 6, 5) | Boogie Woogie | ""We Go Together"" – from Grease | Safe |
| James & Claire | 32 (8, 8, 8, 8) | Cuban Salsa | "I Like It Like That" – Pete Rodriguez | Safe |
| Alex & Katie | 21 (5, 5, 5, 6) | Boogie Woogie | "Jailhouse Rock" – Elvis Presley | Bottom two |
| Toby & Casey | 24 (6, 6, 7, 5) | Cuban Salsa | "Maria Maria" – Santana | Safe |
| Dan & Michelle | 26 (5, 8, 7, 5) | Boogie Woogie | "Big Girls Don't Cry" — The Four Seasons | Eliminated |
| Paul & Natasha | 17 (5, 4, 4, 4) | Cuban Salsa | "La Isla Bonita" — Madonna | Safe |
| Nathan & Kristy | 34 (9, 8, 8, 9) | Boogie Woogie | "Chantilly Lace" – Jerry Lee Lewis | Safe |
| Cem & Gemma | 29 (7, 7, 8, 7) | Cuban Salsa | "Light My Fire" – Will Young | Safe |

=== Week 2 ===
For this week, the couples performed either a Hustle or Argentine Tango.

Couples are listed in the order they performed.

| Couple | Scores | Dance | Music | Result |
|---|---|---|---|---|
| James & Claire | 28 (6, 8, 7, 7) | Hustle | "I Love to Love (But My Baby Loves to Dance)" – Tina Charles | Safe |
| Joseph & Sadie | 33 (9, 8, 8, 8) | Argentine Tango | "[[]]" – [[]] | Safe |
| Paul & Natasha | 24 (4, 7, 7, 6) | Hustle | "Young Hearts Run Free" – Candi Staton | Safe |
| Danny & Jodie | 34 (8, 8, 9, 9) | Argentine Tango | "[[]]" – [[]] | Safe |
| Toby & Casey | 18 (3, 5, 5, 5) | Hustle | "Heaven Must Be Missing an Angel" – Tavares | Bottom two |
| Cem & Gemma | 29 (6, 8, 8, 7) | Argentine Tango | "They" – Jem | Safe |
| Adam & Rebecca | 31 (8, 8, 8, 7) | Hustle | "How Deep Is Your Love" – The Bee Gees | Safe |
| Nathan & Kristy | 22 (5, 5, 6, 6) | Argentine Tango | "[[]]" – [[]] | Safe |
| Alex & Katie | 24 (6, 6, 6, 6) | Hustle | "Native New Yorker" – Odyssey | Eliminated |

=== Week 3 ===
For this week, the couples performed either a Charleston or Lambada.

Couples are listed in the order they performed.

| Couple | Scores | Dance | Music | Result |
|---|---|---|---|---|
| Paul & Natasha | 23 (5, 7, 6, 5) | Charleston | "Anything Goes" – from Anything Goes | Safe |
| Nathan & Kristy | 22 (5, 5, 6, 6) | Lambada | "Lambada" – Kaoma | Bottom two |
| Cem & Gemma | 38 (10, 10, 9, 9) | Charleston | "Put a Lid on It" – Squirrel Nut Zippers | Safe |
| Danny & Jodie | 31 (7, 8, 8, 8) | Lambada | "Nobody Wants to Be Lonely" – Ricky Martin & Christina Aguilera | Safe |
| Joseph & Sadie | 35 (8, 9, 9, 9) | Charleston | "All I Do Is Dream of You" – from Singin' in the Rain | Safe |
| Adam & Rebecca | 20 (4, 5, 6, 5) | Lambada | "Dr Beat" – Miami Sound Machine | Safe |
| James & Claire | 29 (7, 8, 7, 7) | Charleston | "I Wanna Be Loved By You" – Helen Kane | Safe |
| Toby & Casey | 24 (5, 6, 7, 6) | Lambada | "Ain't It Funny" – Jennifer Lopez | Eliminated |

=== Week 4 ===
For this week, the couples performed either a Lindy Hop, Foxtrot or Jitterbug.

Couples are listed in the order they performed.

| Couple | Scores | Dance | Music | Result |
|---|---|---|---|---|
| Cem & Gemma | 29 (6, 8, 7, 8) | Lindyhop | "Jeepers Creepers" – Louis Armstrong | Safe |
| James & Claire | 28 (6, 7, 8, 7) | Foxtrot | "I Get a Kick Out of You" – Frank Sinatra | Safe |
| Danny & Jodie | 29 (8, 7, 7, 7) | Jitterbug | "In the Mood" – The Andrews Sisters | Safe |
| Paul & Natasha | 17 (5, 4, 4, 4) | Foxtrot | "It Had to Be You" – Harry Connick, Jr. | Eliminated |
| Joseph & Sadie | 36 (9, 9, 9, 9) | Lindyhop | "Sing, Sing, Sing" – The Andrews Sisters | Safe |
| Adam & Rebecca | 18 (4, 4, 5, 5) | Foxtrot | "Let's Call the Whole Thing Off" – Harry Connick, Jr. | Bottom two |
| Nathan & Kristy | 34 (9, 8, 9, 8) | Jitterbug | "Don't Sit Under the Apple Tree" – The Andrews Sisters | Safe |

=== Week 5 ===
For this week, the couples performed a Mambo routine. Nathan & Kristy did not dance as Nathan was injured, however public votes kept them in the competition.

Couples are listed in the order they performed.

| Couple | Scores | Dance | Music | Result |
|---|---|---|---|---|
| James & Claire | 24 (5, 6, 7, 6) | Mambo | "Mambo Italiano" – Rosemary Clooney | Safe |
| Joseph & Sadie | 26 (6, 7, 7, 6) | Mambo | "Guaglione" – Perez Prado | Safe |
| Cem & Gemma | 30 (7, 8, 8, 7) | Mambo | "Mambo No. 5" – Lou Bega | Bottom two |
| Adam & Rebecca | 20 (4, 5, 6, 5) | Mambo | "Papa Loves Mambo" – Perry Como | Eliminated |
| Danny & Jodie | 34 (9, 9, 8, 8) | Mambo | "Cherry Pink and Apple Blossom White" – Perez Prado | Safe |

=== Week 6: Quarter-Final ===
For this week, the couples performed the Milonga and a Movie Dance.

Couples are listed in the order they performed.

| Couple | Scores | Dance | Music | Result |
|---|---|---|---|---|
| Danny & Jodie | 38 (10, 10, 9, 9) | Milonga | "[[]]" – [[]] | Safe |
| Danny & Jodie | 36 (9, 9, 9, 9) | Movie Dance | "Cheek to Cheek" – from Top Hat | Safe |
| Cem & Gemma | 26 (5, 7, 7, 7) | Milonga | "Fever" – Michael Bublé | Eliminated |
| Cem & Gemma | 24 (5, 6, 7, 6) | Movie Dance | "More Than a Woman" – from Saturday Night Fever | Eliminated |
| Nathan & Kristy | 22 (5, 6, 6, 5) | Milonga | "Baby I Love You" – Aretha Franklin | Bottom two |
| Nathan & Kristy | 23 (6, 6, 6, 5) | Movie Dance | "Dancing in the Dark" – from The Band Wagon | Bottom two |
| James & Claire | 25 (7, 6, 6, 6) | Milonga | "Those Were the Days" – Mary Hopkin | Safe |
| James & Claire | 30 (7, 7, 8, 8) | Movie Dance | "Laendler" – from The Sound of Music | Safe |
| Joseph & Sadie | 34 (8, 9, 9, 8) | Milonga | "Moondance" – Michael Bublé | Safe |
| Joseph & Sadie | 36 (9, 9, 9, 9) | Movie Dance | "(I've Had) The Time of My Life" – from Dirty Dancing | Safe |

=== Week 7: Semi-Final ===
This week, the couples performed the Waltz and an unlearned dance.

Couples are listed in the order they performed.

| Couple | Scores | Dance | Music | Result |
|---|---|---|---|---|
| James & Claire | 32 (8, 8, 8, 8) | Waltz | "Unchained Melody" – The Righteous Brothers | Bottom two |
| James & Claire | 21 (5, 5, 6, 5) | Jitterbug | "Button Up Your Overcoat" – Helen Kane | Bottom two |
| Danny & Jodie | 34 (7, 9, 9, 9) | Waltz | "Always and Forever" – Heatwave | Safe |
| Danny & Jodie | 40 (10, 10, 10, 10) | Charleston | "You Give a Little Love" – from Bugsy Malone | Safe |
| Nathan & Kristy | 29 (8, 7, 7, 7) | Waltz | "Edelweiss" – from The Sound of Music | Eliminated |
| Nathan & Kristy | 35 (8, 9, 9, 9) | Lindyhop | "Mack the Knife" – Robbie Williams | Eliminated |
| Joseph & Sadie | 20 (3, 6, 6, 5) | Waltz | "If You Don't Know Me By Now" – Simply Red | Safe |
| Joseph & Sadie | 38 (8, 10, 10, 10) | Hustle | "I Will Survive" Gloria Gaynor | Safe |

=== Week 8: Final ===
For the Final, the couples performed three dances; their favourite dance, a Freestyle Showdance and a Charleston.

Couples are listed in the order they performed.

| Couple | Scores | Dance | Music | Result |
|---|---|---|---|---|
| Danny & Jodie | 40 (10, 10, 10, 10) | Milonga | "[[]]" – [[]] | Runners up |
| Danny & Jodie | 31 (7, 7, 8, 9) | Showdance | "Footloose" – Kenny Loggins | Runners up |
| Danny & Jodie | No scores received | Charleston | "You Give a Little Love" – from Bugsy Malone | Runners up |
| Joseph & Sadie | 40 (10, 10, 10, 10) | Lindyhop | "Sing, Sing, Sing" – The Andrews Sisters | Winners |
| Joseph & Sadie | 39 (10, 10, 10, 9) | Showdance | "What You Waiting For?" – Gwen Stefani | Winners |
| Joseph & Sadie | No scores received | Charleston | "All I Do Is Dream of You" – from Singin' in the Rain | Winners |
| James & Claire | 36 (9, 9, 9, 9) | Cuban Salsa | "I Like it Like That" – Pete Rodriguez | Third place |
| James & Claire | 31 (8, 8, 9, 9) | Showdance | "I Wanna Dance with Somebody (Who Loves Me)" – Whitney Houston | Third place |
| James & Claire | No scores received | Charleston | "I Wanna Be Loved By You" – Helen Kane (Not performed) | Third place |

== Series 2 ==
=== Dance chart ===
| Team | Week 1 | Week 2 | Week 3 | Week 4 | Week 5 | Week 6 | Week 7 | Week 8 Final |
|---|---|---|---|---|---|---|---|---|
| Darrien/Hollie | Rock & Roll | Argentine Tango | Guapacha | Jitterbug | American Smooth | Lindyhop, Milonga | Adagio, Hustle | Milonga, Freestyle |
| Darren/Lana | Rock & Roll | Hustle | Guapacha | Lambada | Flamenco | Lindyhop, Milonga | Adagio, American Smooth | Flamenco, Freestyle |
| Ben/Stephanie | Salsa | Argentine Tango | Charleston | Jitterbug | American Smooth | Lindyhop, Milonga | Adagio, Guapacha | Lindyhop, Freestyle |
| JP/Stacey | Rock & Roll | Hustle | Guapacha | Lambada | American Smooth | Lindyhop, Milonga | Adagio, Salsa | Eliminated |
| Mark/Jennifer | Rock & Roll | Argentine Tango | Guapacha | Jitterbug | Flamenco | Lindyhop, Milonga | Eliminated | |
| Paul/Pamela | Salsa | Argentine Tango | Charleston | Jitterbug | Flamenco | Eliminated | | |
| Paul/Aravon | Rock & Roll | Hustle | Charleston | Lambada | Eliminated | | | |
| Stewart/Clare | Salsa | Hustle | Charleston | Eliminated | | | | |
| Rob/Dawn | Salsa | Hustle | Eliminated | | | | | |
| Clive/Helga | Salsa | Eliminated | | | | | | |

=== Scoring Chart ===
Bold scores indicate the highest for that week. Red indicates the lowest score.

| Team | Week 1 | Week 2 | Week 3 | Week 4 | Week 5 | Week 6 | Week 7 | Week 8 Final |
|---|---|---|---|---|---|---|---|---|
| Darrien/Hollie | 33 | 22 | 32 | 27 | 35 | 31+40=71 | 26+30=56 | 40+40=80 |
| Darren/Lana | 29 | 25 | 36 | 28 | 38 | 36+38=74 | 32+40=72 | 40+32=72 |
| Ben/Stephanie | 28 | 28 | 25 | 34 | 34 | 35+33=68* | 25+32=57* | 36+32=68 |
| JP/Stacey | 20 | 20* | 27* | 18 | 22* | 30+23=53 | 18+28=46* | Eliminated |
| Mark/Jennifer | 24* | 25 | 25 | 23* | 21 | 27+24=51* | Eliminated | |
| Paul/Pamela | 21 | 33 | 33 | 35 | 28* | Eliminated | | |
| Paul/Aravon | 21 | 18 | 26 | 12* | Eliminated | | | |
| Stewart/Clare | 25 | 32 | 23* | Eliminated | | | | |
| Rob/Dawn | 25 | 20* | Eliminated | | | | | |
| Clive/Helga | 24* | Eliminated | | | | | | |

=== Average Chart ===
This chart is based on the dancers' averages and not their place in the competition.

| Rank by average | Competition finish | Couple | Total | Number of dances | Average |
|---|---|---|---|---|---|
| 1 | 2 | Darren & Lana | 374 | 11 | 34.0 |
| 2 | 1 | Darrien & Hollie | 356 | 11 | 32.4 |
| 3 | 3 | Ben & Stephanie | 342 | 11 | 31.1 |
| 4 | 6 | Paul & Pamela | 150 | 5 | 30.0 |
| 5 | 8 | Stewart & Clare | 80 | 3 | 26.7 |
| 6 | 5 | Mark & Jennifer | 169 | 7 | 24.1 |
| 7 | 10 | Clive & Helga | 24 | 1 | 24.0 |
| 8 | 4 | JP & Stacey | 206 | 9 | 22.9 |
| 9 | 9 | Rob & Dawn | 45 | 2 | 22.5 |
| 10 | 7 | Paul & Aravon | 77 | 4 | 19.3 |

== Finals Summary ==
=== Weekly Scores ===
Individual judges' scores in the chart below (given in parentheses) are listed in this order from left to right: Ben Richards, Arlene Phillips, Wayne Sleep, Stacey Haynes.

=== Week 1 ===
Couples are listed in the order they performed.

| Couple | Scores | Dance | Music | Result |
|---|---|---|---|---|
| Lana & Darren | 29 (8, 7, 7, 7) | Rock & Roll | "[[]]" – [[]] | Safe |
| Clare & Stewart | 25 (6, 6, 7, 6) | Salsa | "[[]]" – [[]] | Safe |
| Jennifer & Mark | 24 (7, 4, 7, 6) | Rock & Roll | "[[]]" – [[]] | Bottom two |
| Dawn & Rob | 25 (7, 6, 6, 6) | Salsa | "[[]]" – [[]] | Safe |
| Stacey & JP | 20 (5, 4, 6, 5) | Rock & Roll | "[[]]" – [[]] | Safe |
| Stephannie & Ben | 28 (7, 7, 7, 7) | Salsa | "[[]]" – [[]] | Safe |
| Aravon & Paul C. | 21 (6, 3, 5, 7) | Rock & Roll | "[[]]" – [[]] | Safe |
| Helga & Clive | 24 (7, 5, 6, 6) | Salsa | "[[]]" – [[]] | Eliminated |
| Hollie & Darrien | 33 (9, 8, 8, 8) | Rock & Roll | "[[]]" – [[]] | Safe |
| Pamela & Paul M. | 21 (5, 5, 6, 5) | Salsa | "[[]]" – [[]] | Safe |

Judges' votes to leave (Note: These are only preference votes cast by the judges when they were asked who should leave. They had no effect on the final outcome.)

- Ben: Pamela & Paul M.
- Arlene: Aravon & Paul C.
- Wayne: Aravon & Paul C.
- Stacey: Pamela & Paul M.

=== Week 2 ===
Couples are listed in the order they performed.

| Couple | Scores | Dance | Music | Result |
|---|---|---|---|---|
| Dawn & Rob | 20 (5, 4, 6, 5) | Hustle | "[[]]" – [[]] | Eliminated |
| Jennifer & Mark | 25 (7, 6, 6, 6) | Argentine Tango | "[[]]" – [[]] | Safe |
| Lana & Darren | 25 (6, 5, 7, 7) | Hustle | "[[]]" – [[]] | Safe |
| Hollie & Darrien | 22 (5, 4, 7, 6) | Argentine Tango | "[[]]" – [[]] | Safe |
| Stacey & JP | 20 (6, 3, 5, 6) | Hustle | "[[]]" – [[]] | Bottom two |
| Stephannie & Ben | 28 (7, 8, 8, 6) | Argentine Tango | "[[]]" – [[]] | Safe |
| Aravon & Paul C. | 18 (6, 3, 4, 5) | Hustle | "[[]]" – [[]] | Safe |
| Pamela & Paul M. | 33 (8, 9, 8, 8) | Argentine Tango | "[[]]" – [[]] | Safe |
| Clare & Stewart | 32 (8, 8, 8, 8) | Hustle | "[[]]" – [[]] | Safe |

Judges' votes to leave

- Ben: Dawn & Rob
- Arlene: Aravon & Paul C.
- Wayne: Aravon & Paul C.
- Stacey: Aravon & Paul C.

=== Week 3 ===
Couples are listed in the order they performed.

| Couple | Scores | Dance | Music | Result |
|---|---|---|---|---|
| Stephannie & Ben | 25 (7, 6, 6, 6) | Charleston | "[[]]" – [[]] | Safe |
| Stacey & JP | 27 (8, 5, 7, 7) | Guapacha | "[[]]" – [[]] | Bottom two |
| Clare & Stewart | 23 (6, 5, 7, 5) | Charleston | "[[]]" – [[]] | Eliminated |
| Hollie & Darrien | 32 (7, 9, 8, 8) | Guapacha | "[[]]" – [[]] | Safe |
| Pamela & Paul M. | 33 (8, 8, 9, 8) | Charleston | "[[]]" – [[]] | Safe |
| Lana & Darren | 36 (9, 9, 9, 9) | Guapacha | "[[]]" – [[]] | Safe |
| Aravon & Paul C. | 26 (5, 8, 7, 6) | Charleston | "[[]]" – [[]] | Safe |
| Jennifer & Mark | 25 (9, 4, 6, 6) | Guapacha | "[[]]" – [[]] | Safe |

Judges' votes to leave

- Ben: Clare & Stewart
- Arlene: Clare & Stewart
- Wayne: Clare & Stewart
- Stacey: Clare & Stewart

=== Week 4 ===
Couples are listed in the order they performed.

| Couple | Scores | Dance | Music | Result |
|---|---|---|---|---|
| Jennifer & Mark | 23 (6, 6, 6, 5) | Jitterbug | "[[]]" – [[]] | Bottom two |
| Lana & Darren | 28 (7, 7, 7, 7) | Lambada | "[[]]" – [[]] | Safe |
| Hollie & Darrien | 27 (7, 7, 7, 6) | Jitterbug | "[[]]" – [[]] | Safe |
| Stacey & JP | 18 (5, 4, 4, 5) | Lambada | "[[]]" – [[]] | Safe |
| Stephannie & Ben | 34 (8, 9, 9, 8) | Jitterbug | "[[]]" – [[]] | Safe |
| Aravon & Paul C. | 12 (4, 2, 3, 3) | Lambada | "[[]]" – [[]] | Eliminated |
| Pamela & Paul M. | 35 (9, 9, 8, 9) | Jitterbug | "[[]]" – [[]] | Safe |

Judges' votes to leave

- Ben: Aravon & Paul C.
- Arlene: Aravon & Paul C.
- Wayne: Aravon & Paul C.
- Stacey: Aravon & Paul C.

=== Week 5 ===
Couples are listed in the order they performed.

| Couple | Scores | Dance | Music | Result |
|---|---|---|---|---|
| Pamela & Paul M. | 28 (8, 6, 7, 7) | Flamenco | "[[]]" – [[]] | Eliminated |
| Stacey & JP | 22 (6, 5, 6, 5) | American Smooth | "[[]]" – [[]] | Bottom two |
| Lana & Darren | 38 (10, 9, 10, 9) | Flamenco | "[[]]" – [[]] | Safe |
| Stephannie & Ben | 34 (8, 9, 9, 8) | American Smooth | "[[]]" – [[]] | Safe |
| Jennifer & Mark | 21 (5, 4, 7, 5) | Flamenco | "[[]]" – [[]] | Safe |
| Hollie & Darrien | 35 (9, 10, 8, 8) | American Smooth | "[[]]" – [[]] | Safe |

Judges' votes to leave

- Ben: Stacey & JP
- Arlene: Stacey & JP
- Wayne: Stacey & JP
- Stacey: Stacey & JP

=== Week 6 ===
Couples are listed in the order they performed.

| Couple | Scores | Dance | Music | Result |
|---|---|---|---|---|
| Stacey & JP | 30 (7, 8, 8, 7) | Lindyhop | "[[]]" – [[]] | Safe |
| Stacey & JP | 23 (5, 5, 6, 7) | Milonga | "[[]]" – [[]] | Safe |
| Lana & Darren | 36 (9, 9, 9, 9) | Lindyhop | "[[]]" – [[]] | Safe |
| Lana & Darren | 38 (10, 9, 10, 9) | Milonga | "[[]]" – [[]] | Safe |
| Jennifer & Mark | 27 (7, 7, 7, 6) | Lindyhop | "[[]]" – [[]] | Eliminated |
| Jennifer & Mark | 24 (7, 4, 7, 6) | Milonga | "[[]]" – [[]] | Eliminated |
| Hollie & Darrien | 31 (8, 7, 8, 8) | Lindyhop | "[[]]" – [[]] | Safe |
| Hollie & Darrien | 40 (10, 10, 10, 10) | Milonga | "[[]]" – [[]] | Safe |
| Stephannie & Ben | 35 (8, 9, 9, 9) | Lindyhop | "[[]]" – [[]] | Bottom two |
| Stephannie & Ben | 33 (9, 8, 8, 8) | Milonga | "[[]]" – [[]] | Bottom two |

Judges' votes to leave

- Ben: Jennifer & Mark
- Arlene: Jennifer & Mark
- Wayne: Jennifer & Mark
- Stacey: Jennifer & Mark

=== Week 7: Semi-Final ===
Individual judges' scores in the chart below (given in parentheses) are listed in this order from left to right: Ben Richards, Arlene Phillips, Wayne Sleep.

Stacey Haynes was not judging this week - so marks are out of 30 for each dance. Couples are listed in the order they performed.

| Couple | Scores | Dance | Music | Result |
|---|---|---|---|---|
| Stephannie & Ben | 19 (7, 6, 6) | Adagio | "[[]]" – [[]] | Bottom two |
| Stephannie & Ben | 24 (9, 7, 8) | Guapacha | "[[]]" – [[]] | Bottom two |
| Stacey & JP | 14 (6, 4, 4) | Adagio | "[[]]" – [[]] | Eliminated |
| Stacey & JP | 21 (7, 6, 8) | Salsa | "[[]]" – [[]] | Eliminated |
| Lana & Darren | 24 (9, 9, 6) | Adagio | "[[]]" – [[]] | Safe |
| Lana & Darren | 30 (10, 10, 10) | American Smooth | "[[]]" – [[]] | Safe |
| Hollie & Darrien | 20 (8, 6, 6) | Adagio | "[[]]" – [[]] | Safe |
| Hollie & Darrien | 23 (8, 6, 9) | Hustle | "[[]]" – [[]] | Safe |

Judges' votes to leave

- Ben: Stacey & JP
- Arlene: Stacey & JP
- Wayne: Stacey & JP

=== Week 8: Final ===
Couples are listed in the order they performed.

| Couple | Scores | Dance | Music | Result |
|---|---|---|---|---|
| Hollie & Darrien | 40 (10, 10, 10, 10) | Milonga | "[[]]" – [[]] | Winners |
| Hollie & Darrien | 40 (10, 10, 10, 10) | Freestyle | "[[]]" – [[]] | Winners |
| Hollie & Darrien | No scores received | Foxtrot | "[[]]" – [[]] | Winners |
| Lana & Darren | 40 (10, 10, 10, 10) | Flamenco | "[[]]" – [[]] | Runners up |
| Lana & Darren | 32 (9, 5, 9, 9) | Freestyle | "[[]]" – [[]] | Runners up |
| Lana & Darren | No scores received | Foxtrot | "[[]]" – [[]] | Runners up |
| Stephannie & Ben | 36 (9, 9, 9, 9) | Lindyhop | "[[]]" – [[]] | Third place |
| Stephannie & Ben | 32 (8, 8, 8, 8) | Freestyle | "[[]]" – [[]] | Third place |
| Stephannie & Ben | No scores received | Foxtrot | "[[]]" – [[]] | Third place |
