= Born to Shine (British TV series) =

- Genre: Talent; Entertainment
- Presented by: Natasha Kaplinsky
- Judges: Denise van Outen; Jason Gardiner; Various guest judges
- Country of origin: United Kingdom
- Original language: English
- No. of series: 1
- No. of episodes: 6

Production
- Production location: The ITV London Studios
- Running time: 60 minutes

Original release
- Network: ITV
- Release: 17 July – 21 August 2011

Born to Shine is a 2011 ITV entertainment programme which featured "micro-celebrities" who learn a new skill taught to them by talented children to raise money for charity. The show was presented by Natasha Kaplinsky. It was won by Jason Manford.

== Format ==
Teenagers teach celebrities a new talent to perform on the Born to Shine stage. Every week three celebrities perform, in an attempt to make it through to the final. Denise van Outen and Jason Gardiner give their opinions to the celebrities before the lines open for the public to vote for their favourite. All of the money raised goes to Save the Children, of which Kaplinsky is an ambassador.

== Episodes ==
Show	Air date	Guest judge(s)	Celebrity contestants	Results
1	17 July 2011	Kimberley Walsh	Michael Underwood and Angellica Bell	Eliminated
1	17 July 2011	Kimberley Walsh	Jodie Prenger	Eliminated
1	17 July 2011	Kimberley Walsh	Nick Moran	Winner
2	24 July 2011	Alex James	Ruth Langsford	Eliminated
2	24 July 2011	Alex James	Dawn Porter	Eliminated
2	24 July 2011	Alex James	Tony Audenshaw and Lesley Dunlop	Winner
3	31 July 2011	Chipmunk	Jason Byrne	Eliminated
3	31 July 2011	Chipmunk	Joe Swash	Eliminated
3	31 July 2011	Chipmunk	Tracy-Ann Oberman	Winner
4	7 August 2011	Stephen Mulhern and Myleene Klass	Jorgie Porter	Eliminated
4	7 August 2011	Stephen Mulhern and Myleene Klass	Jennie Bond	Eliminated
4	7 August 2011	Stephen Mulhern and Myleene Klass	Jason Manford	Winner
5	14 August 2011	Sebastien Izambard	John Barnes	Eliminated
5	14 August 2011	Sebastien Izambard	Jennie McAlpine	Eliminated
5	14 August 2011	Sebastien Izambard	Gareth Thomas	Winner
6	21 August 2011	N/A	Nick Moran	Eliminated
6	21 August 2011	N/A	Tony Audenshaw and Lesley Dunlop	Eliminated
6	21 August 2011	N/A	Tracy-Ann Oberman	Eliminated
6	21 August 2011	N/A	Gareth Thomas	Eliminated
6	21 August 2011	N/A	Jason Manford	Series Winner

== International versions ==
The format, made in United Kingdom, was exported in two countries around the world.

Country	Title	Network	Host	Year aired
Italy	Altrimenti ci arrabbiamo	Rai 1	Milly Carlucci	2013
Vietnam	Sinh ra để tỏa sáng	VTV3	Đại Nghĩa	2017
