= Sunday Side Up =

Television series

- Presented by: Stephen Mulhern
- Country of origin: United Kingdom
- Original language: English
- No. of series: 1
- No. of episodes: 10

Production
- Running time: 60 minutes (inc. adverts)
- Production company: Shiver

Original release
- Network: ITV
- Release: 27 October – 29 December 2013

Related
- Sunday Scoop

Sunday Side Up is a British talk show that has aired on ITV from 27 October to 29 December 2013 and was hosted by Stephen Mulhern.
