= Pick Me! =

2015 British game show

- Genre: Game show
- Presented by: Stephen Mulhern
- Narrated by: Roy Walker
- Country of origin: United Kingdom
- Original language: English
- No. of series: 1
- No. of episodes: 25

Production
- Running time: 60 minutes (inc. adverts)
- Production company: Possessed

Original release
- Network: ITV
- Release: 19 October – 20 November 2015

Pick Me! is a British game show that aired on ITV from 19 October to 20 November 2015 and is hosted by Stephen Mulhern and voiced by Roy Walker, both of whom have presented Catchphrase.

== Format ==
Mulhern picks three contestants out of the audience, who are wearing flashy outfits in a desperate attempt to be noticed by Mulhern. He will then pick a fourth. The fourth will then be posed three questions and will ask each of the three players for one answer. One of the podiums is loaded with a prize such as a holiday, white goods or a vehicle, and that player has the answers in front of them. The other two will have to make up their answers. If the fourth player can pick the correct podium, (s)he will win that prize. Whichever player is picked wins £1,000 and is replaced; contestants who are picked and manage to bluff their way to being picked are offered a gamble: £1,000 and that prize if they can identify who was correct. All contestants who are picked automatically take home a Pick Me! shirt. This process repeats itself four times, involving ten contestants in total.

All ten of the day's contestants are entered into the pick of the day at the end of the show. The player who gets the biggest cheer plays for the day's star prize; they then pick three contestants to play with them in the final. Each assistant is assigned an envelope, with one envelope containing the star prize and ask the contestant one question without knowing the answer. The contestant then locks in his answers. Once the contestant has given all three answers, the assistants will read out the correct answers from their screen; matched correct answers unlock envelopes. If the contestant opens the envelope with the correct answer they win the star prize.

== Reception ==
The show has received mixed reviews by television critics. Adam Postans referred to the show as a "nightmarish freak show" stating that "its glorious stupidity is utterly compelling".

In 2016, the series won a Rose d'Or for Best Game Show.
