= Stepping Out (British TV series) =

- Presented by: Davina McCall
- Judges: Melanie Brown; Jason Gardiner; Wayne Sleep
- Opening theme: "Dance with Me Tonight" by Olly Murs
- Country of origin: United Kingdom
- Original language: English
- No. of series: 1
- No. of episodes: 5

Production
- Production location: The Fountain Studios
- Production company: ITV Studios

Original release
- Network: ITV, STV, UTV
- Release: 31 August – 28 September 2013

Related
- Strictly Come Dancing; Got to Dance

Stepping Out is a British television show series, featuring celebrities with their real-life spouses and partners learning to dance live on Saturday nights. The show began airing on 31 August 2013 on ITV, and was presented by Davina McCall. The judging panel was confirmed on 29 August 2013 and consisted of Mel B, Jason Gardiner and Wayne Sleep.

Judges and Presenter for Stepping Out

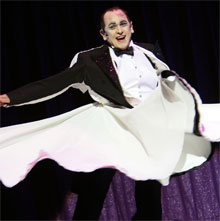
Wayne Sleep

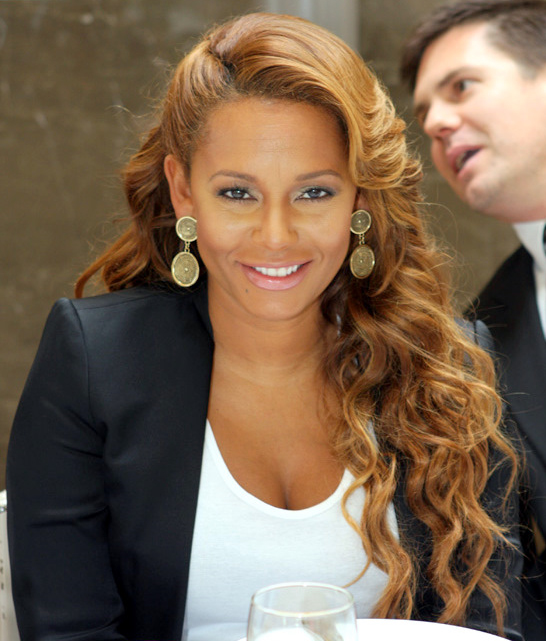
Mel B

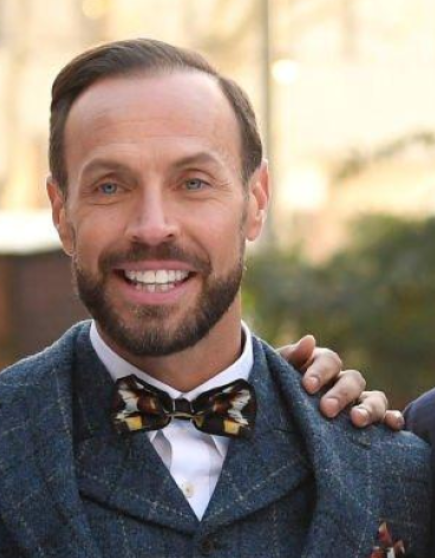
Jason Gardiner

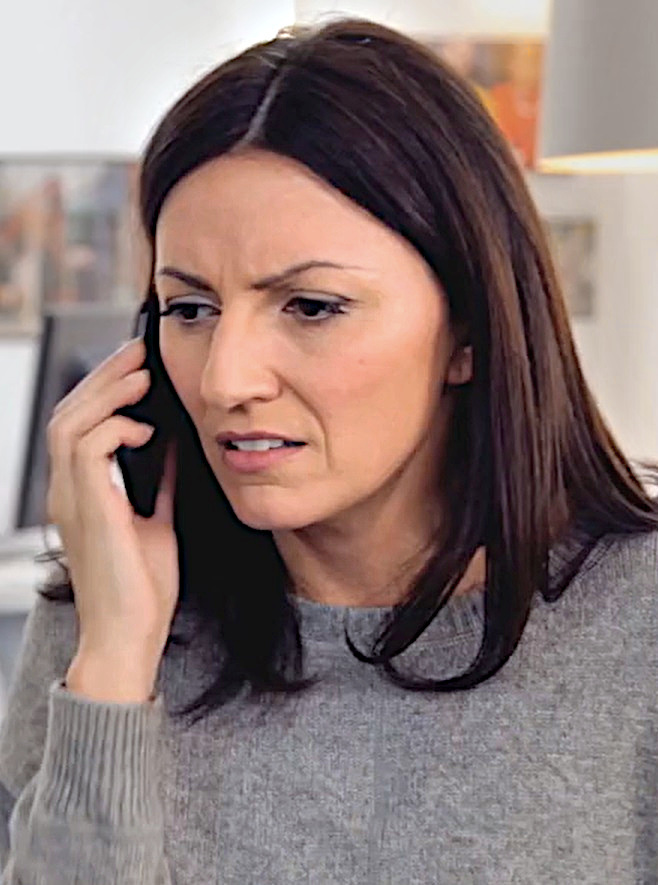
Davina McCall

== Couples ==
There were six couples taking part in the series. They were revealed on 16 August 2013.

Celebrity	Known for	Partner	Status
Denise Welch	Loose Women panelist & actress	Lincoln Townley	Eliminated 1st on 7 September 2013
Glynis Barber	Television actress	Michael Brandon	Eliminated 2nd on 14 September 2013
Carl Froch	Four-time world professional boxer	Rachael Cordingley	Withdrew on 17 September 2013
Laurence Llewelyn-Bowen	Interior designer & TV personality	Jackie Llewelyn-Bowen	Eliminated 3rd on 21 September 2013
Brian McFadden	Former Westlife singer & soloist	Vogue Williams	Runner-up on 28 September 2013
Oritsé Williams	JLS band member/singer	AJ Azari	Winners on 28 September 2013

=== Results summary ===
Contestant	Week 1	Week 2	Week 3	Week 4	Week 5	Tot.	Avg.	Rank by average
Oritsé & AJ	53	56	55	120	119	403	80	1
Brian & Vogue	42	47	55	100	108	352	70	2
Laurence & Jackie	26	36	39	76		177	35	4
Carl & Rachael	31	34	48	—		113	38	3
Glynis & Michael	37	21	32			90	30	5
Denise & Lincoln	28	26				54	27	6

== Episode Summary ==
=== Episode 1 ===
Couple	Order	Judges' scores			Total score	Dance
Couple	Order	Sleep	Mel B	Gardiner	Total score	Dance
Carl	1	6	3	4	31	Cha Cha Cha
Rachael	1	7	5	6	31	Cha Cha Cha
Denise	2	5	6	5	28	Disco
Lincoln	2	4	4	4	28	Disco
Laurence	3	4	3	4	26	Street Dance
Jackie	3	5	7	3	26	Street Dance
Glynis	4	7	8	7	37	Tango
Michael	4	6	4	5	37	Tango
Brian	5	6	8	7	42	Rock 'n Roll
Vogue	5	6	8	7	42	Rock 'n Roll
Oritsé	6	8	10	9	53	Tap
AJ	6	8	10	8	53	Tap

=== Episode 2 ===
- Guest performance: Flawless

Couple	Order	Judges' scores			Total score	Dance	Result
Couple	Order	Sleep	Mel B	Gardiner	Total score	Dance	Result
Glynis	1	6	3	4	21	Line	Safe
Michael	1	4	2	2	21	Line	Safe
Brian	2	8	8	7	47	Contemporary	Safe
Vogue	2	8	8	8	47	Contemporary	Safe
Carl	3	6	4	5	34	Bangra	Safe
Rachael	3	7	6	6	34	Bangra	Safe
Denise	4	6	4	5	26	Rumba	Eliminated
Lincoln	4	5	3	3	26	Rumba	Eliminated
Oritsé	5	8	10	9	56	Salsa	Safe
AJ	5	9	10	10	56	Salsa	Safe
Laurence	6	6	5	5	36	American Smooth	Safe
Jackie	6	7	7	6	36	American Smooth	Safe

=== Episode 3 ===
- Guest performance: Flawless

Couple	Order	Judges' scores			Total score	Dance	Result
Couple	Order	Sleep	Mel B	Gardiner	Total score	Dance	Result
Oritsé	1	9	10	8	55	Quickstep	Safe
AJ	1	10	10	8	55	Quickstep	Safe
Laurence	2	8	7	7	39	Rock & Roll	Safe
Jackie	2	7	5	5	39	Rock & Roll	Safe
Glynis	3	8	7	6	32	Cha Cha Cha	Eliminated
Michael	3	5	3	3	32	Cha Cha Cha	Eliminated
Carl	4	10	8	7	48	Rumba	Safe
Rachael	4	10	7	6	48	Rumba	Safe
Brian	5	9	10	9	55	Street	Safe
Vogue	5	9	9	9	55	Street	Safe

=== Episode 4 ===
- Guest performance: The Saturdays

This week the celebrities had to dance with someone else's partner for one performance, this was known on the show as the "Wife Swap"

On 17 September 2013 it was confirmed that Carl Froch and Rachael Cordingley had withdrawn from the competition after Froch sustained an injury at the end of his performance in Week 3.

Couple	Order	Judges' scores			Total score	Dance	Result
Couple	Order	Sleep	Mel B	Gardiner	Total score	Dance	Result
Laurence	1	5	3	3	24	Paso Doble	Eliminated
Jackie	1	7	3	3	24	Paso Doble	Eliminated
Oritsé	2	10	10	10	60	Bollywood	Safe
AJ	2	10	10	10	60	Bollywood	Safe
Brian	3	8	6	7	44	Samba	Safe
Vogue	3	9	7	7	44	Samba	Safe
Oritsé	4	10	10	10	30	Jazz	—N/a
Vogue	4	10	10	8	28	Jazz	—N/a
Laurence	5	8	10	7	25	Jazz	—N/a
AJ	5	10	10	10	30	Jazz	—N/a
Brian	6	9	10	9	28	Jazz	—N/a
Jackie	6	9	10	8	27	Jazz	—N/a

=== Episode 5 ===
- Guest performance: Diversity

The finalists danced twice during the final show, the first time performing the Rumba and the second, their favourite dance routine of the series.

Couple	Order	Judges' scores			Total score	Dance	Result
Couple	Order	Sleep	Mel B	Gardiner	Total score	Dance	Result
Brian	1	9	10	8	108	Rumba	Runners-up
Vogue	1	9	7	9	108	Rumba	Runners-up
Brian	3	9	10	9	108	Street	Runners-up
Vogue	3	10	9	9	108	Street	Runners-up
Oritsé	2	10	10	9	119	Rumba	Winners
AJ	2	10	10	10	119	Rumba	Winners
Oritsé	4	10	10	10	119	Salsa	Winners
AJ	4	10	10	10	119	Salsa	Winners

== Ratings ==
Weekly ratings for each show on ITV1. All ratings are provided by BARB.

Episode	Date	Official rating (millions)	Weekly rank for ITV
Episode 1	31 August	3.53	15
Episode 2	7 September	2.23	30
Episode 3	14 September	3.11	24
Episode 4	21 September	3.40	23
Episode 5	28 September	<2.47	—N/a
