= Tim Dixon (professor) =

British academic

Timothy J. Dixon is a British professor who holds the professorial chair in sustainable futures in the built environment at the University of Reading (School of the Built Environment). His research encompasses city foresight, futures studies, sustainable futures in the built environment and social sustainability.

== Publications ==
- Sustainable Futures in the Built Environment to 2050. Wiley (2018). ISBN 978-1-119-06381-0
- Urban Retrofitting for Sustainability: Mapping the Transition to 2050 (2014). Routledge. ISBN 978-0-415-64251-4
- Urban Regeneration and Social Sustainability: Best Practice from European Cities (2010) ISBN 978-1-4051-9419-8
- Real Estate & the New Economy: The Impact of Information and Communications Technology. John Wiley & Sons (2005). ISBN 978-1-4051-4369-1
