= Jason Gardiner =

Australian choreographer, singer, and theatre producer (born 1971)

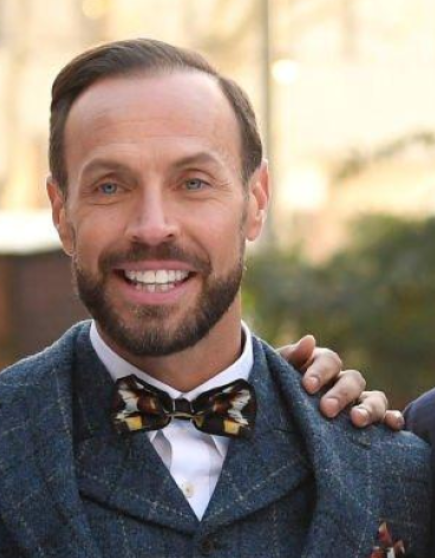
- Born: 6 November 1971 (age 54); Melbourne, Australia
- Occupations: Choreographer, singer, theatre producer
- Years active: 1991–present
- Television: Dancing on Ice (2006–2011, 2013–2014, 2018–2019); Born to Shine (2011); Stepping Out (2013)
- Website: Official website

Jason Gardiner (born 6 November 1971) is an Australian choreographer, singer, and theatre producer best known for his role as a caustic and controversial judge on the ITV shows Dancing on Ice, Born to Shine and Stepping Out.

Gardiner was a judge on the first series of the BBC talent show Strictly Dance Fever. From 2006 to 2011, Gardiner was one of the original judges on the ITV show Dancing on Ice. Gardiner returned to Dancing on Ice for its eighth series in 2013, but the show was cancelled after its ninth series in 2014. He returned as a judge on the show in 2018., before leaving the show for a second time in 2019.

In 2006, Gardiner was one of the judges invited to take part in Torvill and Dean's Dancing on Ice, an Australian version of Dancing on Ice, screened on the Nine Network.

== Early life ==
Adopted at the age of six months, Gardiner was born in Melbourne and grew up in at rural Victoria. He was bullied at school for being homosexual and suffered from anorexia for two years until he came to terms with his sexuality at the age of 16.

At 12, Gardiner wrote and submitted his first musical and was the youngest ever applicant to attend The Workshop in Sydney.

== Television ==
Year	Title	Role	Reference(s)
2004–2005	Queer Eye for the Straight Guy UK	Culture Vulture	2 Seasons, 14 Episodes
2005	Strictly Dance Fever	Judge	
2006	Live @ 5.30	Regular Panellist	
2006	Torvill and Dean's Dancing on Ice	Judge	
2006–2011, 2013–2014, 2018–2019	Dancing on Ice	Judge	
2009–2012	This Morning	Various roles	
2011	Born to Shine	Judge	
2011	Alone in the Wild	Contestant	
2013	Stepping Out	Judge	
2016	Bear Grylls: Mission Survive	Contestant	
2016	Battlechefs	Contestant	
2018	Ant and Dec Saturday Night Takeaway	Series 15 mini series Saturday Knight Takeaway	Himself, Member of The Dishonoured

=== Film ===
- 1998 – Cats – Alonzo

=== Guest appearances ===
- Daily Cooks Challenge – Celebrity judge
- The Chase: Celebrity Special (26 October 2013) – Contestant
- The Great Sport Relief Bake Off (January 2014) – Contestant
- Celebrity Juice (13 March 2014) – Guest
- Tipping Point: Lucky Stars (6 August 2014) – Contestant
- Let's Do Christmas with Gino & Mel (11 December 2014) – Guest

== Theatre ==
- 1987 – Cats – Australian Cast – Theatre Royal Sydney
- 1988 – 42nd Street – Original Australian Cast – Her Majesty's Theatre
- 1991 – West Side Story – USA National Tour – Dance Captain
- 1992 – Kizmet – Miami – Jackie Gleeson Theatre USA
- 1993 – 42nd Street – Dance Captain – Australian National
- 1994 – My Fair Lady – Dance Captain – Victorian State Opera
- 1995 – West Side Story – Riff – Princess Theatre, Melbourne
- 1996 – Dames at Sea – Dick – Ambassador's Theatre London
- 1997 – Cats – Munkustrap, Rum Tum Tugger, Alonzo and Gus – New London Theatre
- 1998 – Oklahoma! – Fight Captain – Royal National Theatre London
- 1999 – Chicago – Aaron – Adelphi Theatre London
- 2000 – Lady Be Good – Bertie Bassett/Choreographer – La Fenice Opera, Venice, Italy
- 2002 – Lady Be Good – Bertie Bassett/ Director/Choreographer – Sao Carlos Opera House Lisbon, Portugal
- 2002 – Anything Goes – Royal National Theatre- Associate Choreographer
- 2003 – Chicago – Fred Casely – Baalbeck Festival, Lebanon
- 2004 – Anything Goes – Dance Captain – Theatre Royal Drury Lane
- 2011 – Aladdin – Abanazar – Venue Cymru, North Wales Qdos Entertainment
- 2018 – Ruthless! – Arts Theatre
- 2018 – Aladdin – Abanazar – The Hawth Theatre, Crawley
- 2022 – Jack and the Beanstalk – Evil's O'Greedy – Queen's Theatre, Barnstaple

== Choreography ==
- 1989 – Kylie Minogue – Sydney Mardi Gras – Dance Captain
- 1990 – Ce Ce Peniston – USA Tour – Assistant Choreographer/Dance Captain
- 1992 – Lalique Show – Hong Kong – Choreographer and Director
- 1993 – YSL Fashion Show – Hong Kong – Choreographer and Director
- 1994 – Piaget 120th Anniversary Show – Manila Philippines – Director/Choreographer
- 1996 – Björk – Smashits Concert – Dancer
- 1997 – Shirley Bassey – Royal Albert Hall – Choreographer
- 1998 – Cher – Heaven Concert – Choreographer
- 2000 – Ultra Nate – Mardi Gras Sydney – Choreographer
- 2000 – Lady Be Good – La Fenice Opera House, Venice – Director/Choreographer
- 2001 – Marc Almond – Soft Cell Concert – Choreographer
- 2001 – Benefit – Edel Records – Choreographer
- 2002 – Lady Be Good – Sao Carlos Opera House, Lisbon – Director/Choreographer
- 2002 – Caroline O’Conner – Sydney Opera House – Guest artist
- 2002 – Victoria Wilson James – Purple in the Park – Choreographer
- 2002 – Gareth Gates Wembley – Choreographer
- 2002 – MTV EUROPE – Mondo Show Germany – Director/Choreographer
- 2003 – London Concert for Peace – Theatre Royal Drury Lane – Producer/Choreographer
- 2003 – Johnny P – Zurich Gay Pride Concert – Choreographer
- 2003 – Elton John Premier League Football campaign – BSkyB TVChoreographer
- 2003 – Persil Trade Show – Leicester Square – Director/Choreographer
- 2003 – Scuzz TV campaign – SkyTV commercial – Choreographer
- 2003 – Blue TV – SkyTV commercial – Choreographer
- 2004 – Premier League/Championship Snooker – BSkyB commercial – Choreographer
- 2005 – Graham Norton's Celebrity All Stars – BBC One – Choreographer
- 2005 – Peyton Hed Kandi Gay Pride Concert – London – Producer/Choreographer
- 2005 – Pregnancy Week Campaign – Discovery Channel – Choreographer

== Vocal recordings ==
- 42nd Street – Original Australian cast recording
- Oklahoma! – Royal National Theatre Production
- Chicago – Billy Flynn and Amos, Time Music
- La Cage aux Folles – Time Music
- A Chorus Line – Paul San Marco, Time Music
- Oliver – Time Music
- Follies – Old Ben and Young Ben, Time Music
- Anything Goes – Royal National Theatre Production, First Night Music
