= Finger Tips =

- Genre: Children's television Handicraft
- Created by: The Foundation
- Written by: Nic Ayling; Vanessa Amberleigh
- Directed by: Michael Kerrigan; Jason Garbett
- Presented by: Stephen Mulhern (Series 1-4) (2001–2004); Fearne Cotton (Series 1-3)(2001–2003); Naomi Wilkinson (Series 4-5) (2004, 2008); Tim Dixon (Series 5) (2008)
- Theme music composer: Ian Porter; Peter Miller
- Country of origin: United Kingdom
- Original language: English
- No. of series: 5
- No. of episodes: 120

Production
- Executive producers: Vanessa Hill; J Nigel Pickard
- Producers: Nic Ayling; Vanessa Amberleigh
- Production location: The Maidstone Studios
- Running time: 5–17 minutes
- Production company: The Foundation

Original release
- Network: ITV (CITV)
- Release: 3 September 2001 – 14 December 2008

Finger Tips is a British children's television series that aired on CITV and was broadcast from 3 September 2001 to 14 December 2008. It was produced by The Foundation.

== Format ==
Finger Tips is an arts and crafts series that centres around creating things with objects that can be found in your home. The makes produced on the show were divided up into different categories:

- Top Make: A major project, normally at the start of the show
- Food Finger Tips: Easy cooking and baking recipes
- Fun Finger Tips: Self-made games
- Little Finger Tips: Items made for making over odds and ends from around the home
- Makeover Finger Tips: Basically the same as "Little Finger Tips"- replaced it in later shows

"Top Make" and "Little" or "Make-Over Finger Tips" featured in every show, and "Fun" and "Food Tips" were usually in alternate shows. There were also more specialised categories which ran briefly, they were:

- Fizzics Finger-Tips: Fun science experiment
- Cryptic Finger-Tips: A special series on code-breaker
- Green Finger-Tips: Plant-related project
- Techno Finger-Tips: Projects using a computer
- Party Finger-Tips: Party idea

Special challenge is the "One-Minute-Make". In this game one of the presenters tries to make something with only a few things in less than 60 seconds. This is featured in every show, with one presenter making the project, and the other timing it, alternating in each episode.

== Production ==
The series was recorded at The Maidstone Studios in Kent, former home to TVS Television.

The programme was first presented by both Stephen Mulhern and Fearne Cotton from its first series to its third series.

However, for the programme's fourth series, for numerous unknown reasons Fearne did not return to the programme, leaving Stephen as the only original presenter left, instead Naomi Wilkinson was brought in as her replacement, presenting the programme alongside Stephen Mulhern for the programme's fourth series.

The programme was axed by ITV after its fourth series in 2004 as part of a scheme devised by ITV to de-commission their original children's programming.

After four years, with the fourth series of the programme subsequently thought to be its final one due to the programme being axed by ITV, the programme was suddenly brought back in 2008 for one more series with Naomi reprising her role as the female presenter, having previously first presented the programme in the programme's originally thought final series. However, for numerous unknown reasons Stephen decided not to return to present the revised new series, as a result, Stephen's presenting role in the programme was taken over by Tim Dixon.

== Series guide ==
- Series 1: 13 x 17′ (3 September 2001 – 26 November 2001)
- Series 2: 20 x 15’ / 7 x 10’ / 3 x 5’ (2 September 2002 – 27 September 2002)
- Series 3: 20 x 15’ / 5 x 12’ (2 June 2003 – 27 June 2003)
- Series 4: 13 x 15’ / 7 x 5’ (10 June 2004 – 2 September 2004)
- Series 5: 30 x 15’ / 30 x 11’ (6 September 2008 – 14 December 2008)

== VHS/DVDs ==
VHS and DVDs of the series were released by Right Entertainment/Universal Pictures Video in the United Kingdom. They were titled Make and Do at your Finger Tips (after the show's tagline), and featured episodes from the second and third series.

Title	Episodes	Release date
The One With... Balloony Boogie	The One with No Freeze Chocolate Ice Cream The One with the Eyes that Follow; The One with the Finger Board Skate Park; The One with Balloony Boogie; The One with the Chamber of Doom Party	30 September 2002; 10 May 2004 (DVD reissue)
The One With... Penguin Skittles	The One with Penguin Skittles The One with the Snappy Croc Box; The One with Grow Your Own Cat; The One with the Flippin' Chicken	10 January 2005
The One With... Pop Up Lazy Legs	The One with Fruity Ropey Soap The One with the Ball in the Bowl Cake; The One with Pop Up Lazy Legs; The One with Tarzan Skittles	10 May 2005
The One With....The House Of Horror Party	The One with the House of Horror Party The One with the Head Turn Box; The One with the Perfect Dream Catcher; The One with the Witch's Brew	9 August 2005 (DVD only)
Make And Do At Your Fingertips: Volume 1-3 Box Set		23 May 2005

== International broadcast ==
In 2002, the series was licensed internationally to Entertainment Rights.

The show has also been broadcast in Austria, Belgium, Canada, France, Germany (Super RTL since September 2004), Greece, Hong Kong, India, Malaysia, New Zealand, Slovenia, Singapore, Switzerland, Taiwan, Thailand, Turkey, Vietnam, Kuwait, and Romania.
