= Stephen Mulhern =

English entertainer (born 1977)

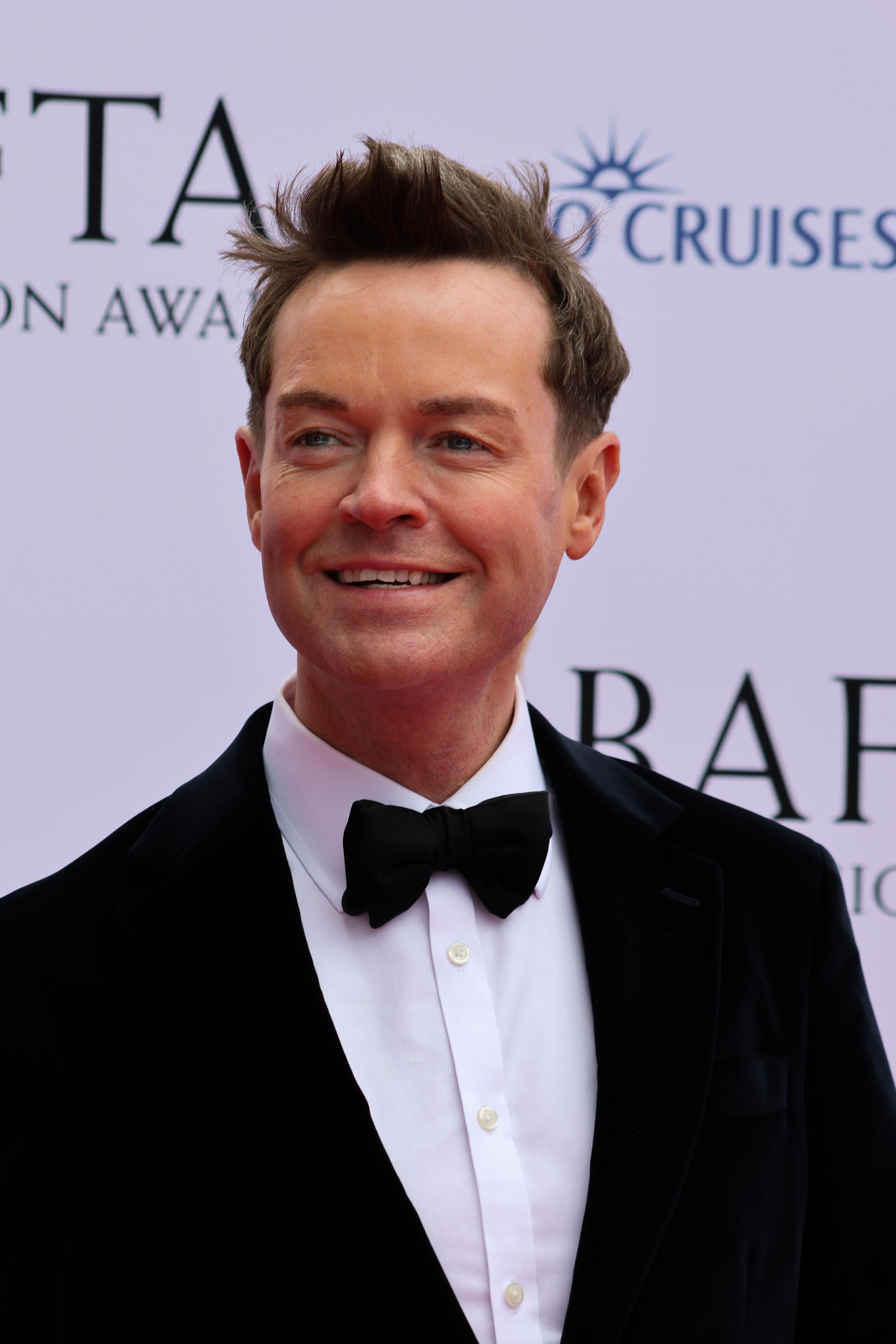
- Mulhern in 2026
- Born: Stephen Daniel Mulhern; 4 April 1977 (age 49); Stratford, London, England
- Education: St Bonaventure's
- Occupations: Television presenter; magician; entertainer; comedian
- Years active: 1998–present
- Employer: ITV
- Website: stephenmulhern.co.uk

Stephen Daniel Mulhern (born 4 April 1977) is an English television presenter, magician and comedian. He began his career at CITV presenting the children's television shows Finger Tips (2001–2004) and Tricky TV (2005–2010). Mulhern went on to present various television shows for ITV, including Britain's Got More Talent (2007–2019), Animals Do the Funniest Things (2007–2011), This Morning's Hub (2011–2014), Catchphrase (2013–present), Big Star's Little Star (2013–2018), In for a Penny (2019–2024), Rolling In It (2020–2021), Deal or No Deal (2023–present) and Dancing on Ice (2024–2025).

== Early life and education ==
Stephen Daniel Mulhern was born on 4 April 1977 in Stratford, London. His parents, Maureen and Christopher, were market traders. He attended St Bonaventure's in Forest Gate, east London.

== Career ==
=== Magic ===
Mulhern gained his interest in comedy and magic from his father, who taught him tricks when he was young. He began public magic performances when he was 11 years old. He used to perform at Butlin's Minehead during family holidays, and was a Redcoat for two years. He became the youngest member of The Magic Circle, which brought about an appearance on Blue Peter in a piece about Harry Houdini. Mulhern was later suspended from The Magic Circle for revealing a magic trick on the children's television programme Finger Tips. The suspension was eventually lifted.

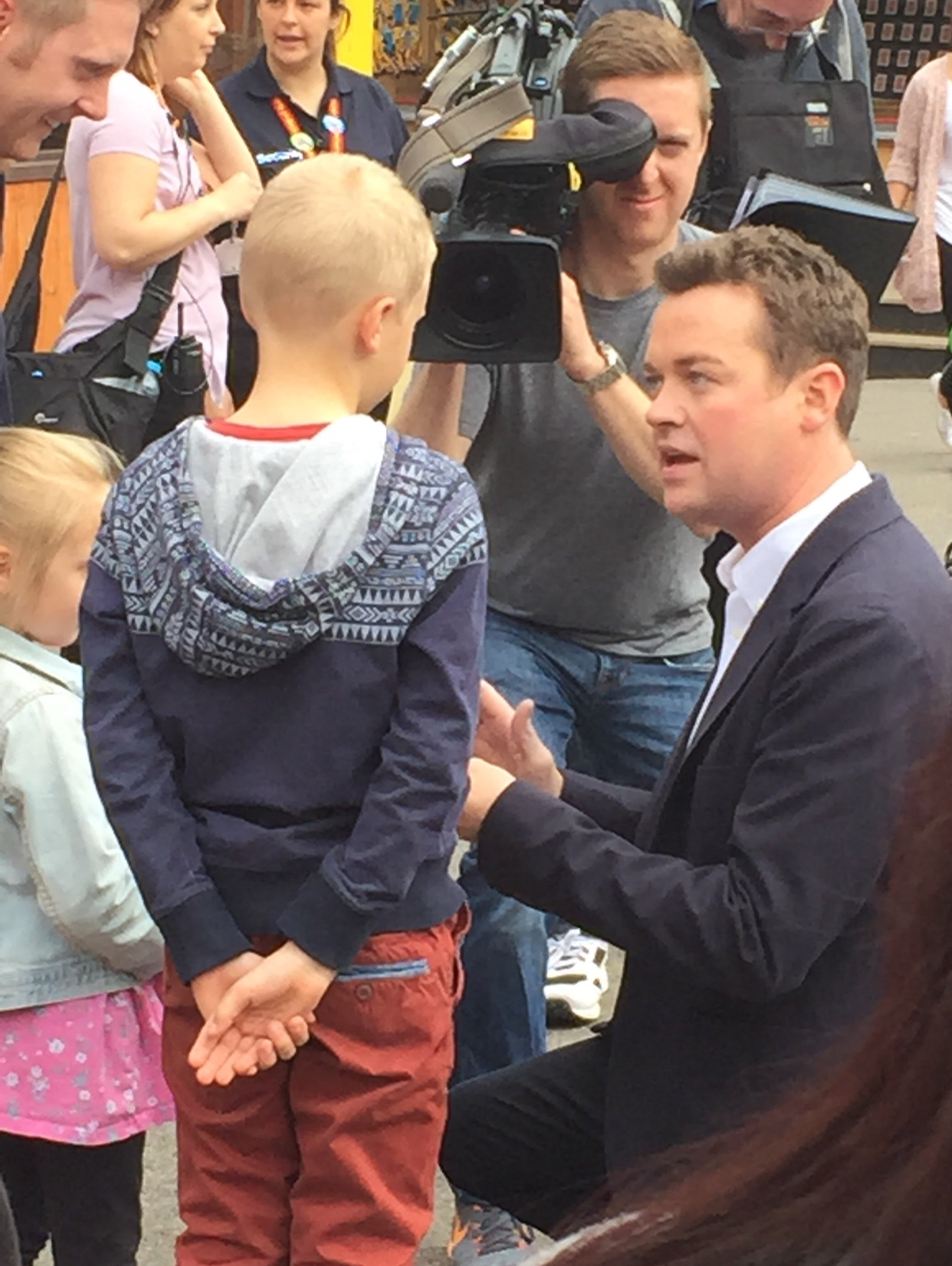
Mulhern at Chessington World of Adventures in 2015, performing a magic trick in front of a child for CITV show Tricky TV

After leaving school, he created a magic show under the title Stephen's Mega Mad Magic Show. Turned down at age 18 by Michael Barrymore for My Kind of People, he won another television talent show called The Big Big Talent Show which was hosted by Jonathan Ross, and as a result, in 1997 was invited to take part in the Royal Variety Performance at the Victoria Palace Theatre.

Mulhern has appeared on the Disney Channel and then on CITV alongside Holly Willoughby on Saturday Showdown. His television credits since have included The Quick Trick Show and more recently Tricky TV. In 2005, Mulhern created and presented the Channel 4 magic show Freaky. In 2006, he performed a magic routine in an episode of The Slammer and came in second place. The dance group Flawless, who went on to perform on Britain's Got Talent, came first. Mulhern's 2010 entertainment show Magic Numbers featured magic and illusions during the phone-in process.

=== Radio ===
On 5 August 2012, Mulhern became co-presenter of Sunday breakfast from 9am to 12 midday with Emma Willis across the Heart Network. The duo occasionally present the Heart London Breakfast show when regular hosts, Jamie Theakston and Amanda Holden are away.

In 2021, Mulhern began presenting shows on Virgin Radio UK. He covered Graham Norton in the weekend morning 9.30am to 12.30pm slot in August and also presented a week of the Chris Evans Breakfast Show in December. Mulhern returned to Virgin to host another week of the Chris Evans Breakfast Show in April 2022.

=== Television ===
Mulhern began presenting on CITV in 1998. He co-hosted four series of Finger Tips with Fearne Cotton from 2001 until 2003 and with Naomi Wilkinson in 2004. He presented children's show Tricky TV from 2005 to 2010. He also co-hosted Holly & Stephen's Saturday Showdown (originally called Ministry of Mayhem) with Holly Willoughby from 2004 to 2006.

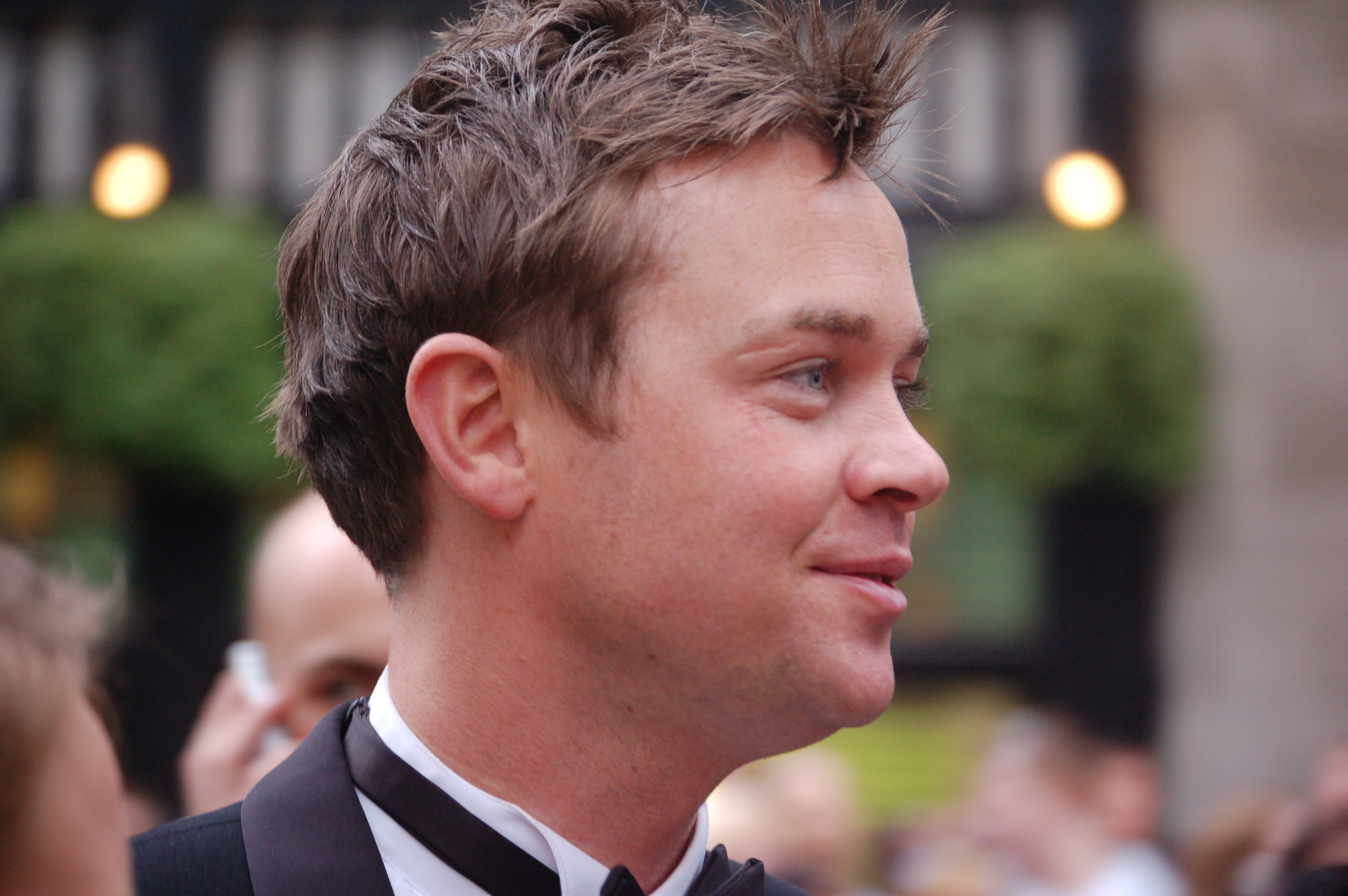
Mulhern at the BAFTAs in 2008

From 2006 to 2007, Mulhern hosted the ITV2 spin-off Dancing on Ice: Defrosted, while Phillip Schofield and Holly Willoughby hosted the main show.

From 2007 to 2019, Mulhern hosted ITV2 spin-off Britain's Got More Talent, which aired immediately after the main ITV show, which is hosted by Ant & Dec. Since 2013, Mulhern has become associated with the word 'unbelievable' which slowly became his catchphrase, usually used on Britain's Got More Talent as he walks offscreen at the end of a section, with Ant & Dec often mimicking him, and is also known for saying "Doosh!"

From 2009 to 2011, Mulhern narrated the ITV entertainment show Animals Do the Funniest Things.

Mulhern regularly presented inside 'The Hub', a small segment on the ITV daytime show This Morning. He most recently hosted the segment on Thursday and Friday mornings although had previously hosted on Wednesdays and Thursdays until the departure of Matt Johnson in the summer of 2013. Mulhern has occasionally presented the main show, standing in for the regular presenters.

In 2010, he hosted primetime game show Magic Numbers on ITV. Mulhern has hosted numerous episodes of The Big Quiz.

Since April 2013, Mulhern has presented a revived version of ITV game show Catchphrase. In September 2013, Mulhern began presenting ITV's Big Star's Little Star, a show which sees celebrities and their children compete to win up to £15,000 for charity.

On 27 October 2013, Mulhern began hosting a live Sunday morning show called Sunday Side Up on ITV. On 21 December 2013, Mulhern hosted entertainment special The Illusionists on ITV. On 14 September 2014, Mulhern guest hosted an episode of Sunday Night at the Palladium.

In early 2015, Mulhern presented the primetime ITV reality series Get Your Act Together. On 5 February 2015, he began presenting ITV2 panel show Reality Bites. In 2015, he presented The Magic Show Story a one-off special for ITV and The Saturday Night Story, a two-part series focusing on Saturday night television. In 2015, Mulhern presented Pick Me!, a daytime game show for ITV as well as ITV's annual charity telethon Text Santa. In March 2015, Mulhern became a victim of the Ant & Dec Undercover segment on Ant & Dec's Saturday Night Takeaway.

In February 2016, Mulhern became the presenter of the 'Ant vs Dec' segment on Ant & Dec's Saturday Night Takeaway after replacing Ashley Roberts. In 2016, Mulhern presented Go for It, and co-hosted The Next Great Magician alongside Rochelle Humes for ITV. On 12 April 2018, it was announced that Mulhern would host The National Lottery Draws on ITV.

In 2019, Mulhern presented In For a Penny, which is based on a segment he presents on Ant & Dec's Saturday Night Takeaway of the same name.

In August 2020, Mulhern began presenting a new game show on ITV, Rolling In It, featuring both contestants and celebrities. In February 2022, Mulhern guest presented Dancing on Ice alongside Willoughby whilst Phillip Schofield self-isolated from COVID-19. In January 2023 it was reported that a reboot of the show Deal or No Deal would be hosted by Mulhern airing from 20 November 2023. In December 2023, Mulhern was announced as the replacement co-host of Dancing on Ice, succeeding Schofield who resigned from ITV earlier in the year. Mulhern co-hosted Dancing on Ice from Series 16 in January 2024 to its cancellation at the end of Series 17 in March 2025.

=== Butlin's (2008 – 2025) ===
Starting in 2008, Mulhern maintained a long-standing relationship with the British holiday resort chain Butlin's, returning to the venues where he first began his entertainment career. Mulhern who originally worked as a Butlin’s Redcoat at the Minehead resort in the late 1990s, an experience he has described as formative to his career as a performer — regularly performed headline shows during school holiday periods at all three Butlin’s resorts (Minehead, Bognor Regis and Skegness).

In 2023 he signed a three-year contract reportedly worth £1 million to act as the resort chain’s ambassador and headline performer, extending his association with Butlin’s through the 2025 season. Under the agreement, Mulhern not only starred in live stage productions including the specially created Out of This World show in 2025 — but also featured prominently in national advertising and brand campaigns for the company.

As part of his role in promoting Butlin’s and celebrating both his personal journey and the resort’s entertainment heritage, a life-sized statue of Mulhern in a classic Redcoat uniform was commissioned and unveiled in 2023. The statue was initially displayed in Westfield Shopping Centre, Stratford his hometown — before being relocated to the Minehead resort, symbolising his full-circle return to the place where his career began.

During his three years as a headline performer, Mulhern entertained over one million guests and became a key figure in the resort’s promotional efforts, helping to launch initiatives such as the redesigned Redcoat uniform and training academy.

In June 2025 it was confirmed that his contract with Butlin’s would not be renewed beyond the 2025 season, bringing to an end one of the longest and most high-profile celebrity entertainments in the resort’s recent history. Both Mulhern and Butlin’s described the partnership as “hugely positive”, with Mulhern expressing his enthusiasm for exploring new opportunities in family entertainment following his final appearances in August 2025.

== Filmography ==
=== Television ===
Year	Title	Role	Notes
1997	Timmy Towers	Merlin	1 episode
1998–2002	CITV	Presenter	Presenter during studio segments in between children's programmes shown during afternoons on ITV
1999–2004	The Quick Trick Show	Presenter	5 series
2000–2004	Finger Tips	Co-presenter	With Fearne Cotton and Naomi Wilkinson
2002–2003	Brilliant Creatures	Presenter	
2003	You Can Do Magic	Presenter	
2003	SMTV Live	Presenter	
2003–2004	Globo Loco	Presenter	
2004	Junior Eurovision Song Contest: The British Final	Co-presenter	With Holly Willoughby and Michael Underwood
2004–2006	Holly & Stephen's Saturday Showdown	Co-presenter	With Holly Willoughby
2005	Stars in Their Eyes	Himself	Performer; 2 episodes
2005–2006, 2010	Tricky TV	Presenter	3 series
2006–2007	Dancing on Ice: Defrosted	Presenter	
2007–2019	Britain's Got More Talent	Presenter	13 series
2007–2011	Animals Do the Funniest Things	Presenter	15 episodes
2009	All Star Impression Show	Presenter	
2009	Anonymous	Presenter	1 series
2010	Magic Numbers	Presenter	1 series
2010	The 5 O'Clock Show	Co-presenter	With Kimberley Walsh
2010–2013	Celebrity Juice	Himself	Guest; 3 episodes
2010, 2015	Coronation Street Uncovered: Live	Presenter	2 episodes
2011	Born to Shine	Guest judge	1 episode
2011–2014	This Morning's Hub	Presenter	Regular
2011–2012, 2016-2023, 2025-present	The Big Quiz	Presenter	7 episodes
2012	Emmerdale Live – The Fallout	Presenter	Television special
2012	All Star Mr & Mrs: Text Santa Special	Presenter	Television charity special
2012–2013	This Morning	Guest presenter	4 episodes
2013	The Paul O'Grady Show	Guest presenter	1 episode
2013	Sunday Side Up	Presenter	1 series
2013	The Illusionists	Presenter	Television special
2013–2018	Big Star's Little Star	Presenter	5 series
2013–present	Catchphrase	Presenter	7 series
2014	Sunday Night at the Palladium	Guest presenter	1 episode
2015	Get Your Act Together	Presenter	1 series
2015	Reality Bites	Presenter	1 series
2015	The Magic Show Story	Presenter	Television special
2015	The Saturday Night Story	Narrator	Two-part series
2015	The Nation's Favourite Disney Song	Narrator	Television special
2015	Text Santa	Co-presenter	Christmas appeal show
2015	Pick Me!	Presenter	1 series
2015–2018	Through the Keyhole	Himself	3 episodes
2016	Go for It	Presenter	
2016	The Next Great Magician	Co-presenter	1 series
2016–2024	Ant & Dec's Saturday Night Takeaway	Presenter	'Ant vs Dec' and 'In for a Penny' segments
2018	Big Star's Bigger Star	Presenter	1 series
2018—present	The National Lottery Draws	Presenter	During advert breaks
2019–2024	In For a Penny	Presenter	6 series
2020–2021	Rolling In It	Presenter	2 series
2020–2021	The One Show	Guest presenter	2 episodes
2021	Game of Talents	Himself	1 episode
2022, 2024–2025	Dancing on Ice	Guest presenter (2022), main co-presenter (2024–2025)	Alongside Holly Willoughby
2022	Britain's Got Talent: The Ultimate Magician	Presenter	Standing in for Ant & Dec
2023–present	Deal or No Deal	Presenter	Rebooted daytime series
2024–2025	You Bet!	Co–presenter (2024), main presenter (2025)	Alongside Holly Willoughby (2024)
2025	The Accidental Tourist	Himself	Alongside Ant & Dec

== Radio ==
Year	Station	Show	Role
2012–2018	Heart Network	Sunday mornings	Co-presenter with Emma Willis
2021–present	Virgin Radio UK	Cover presenter	The Graham Norton Radio Show and The Chris Evans Breakfast Show
