= Vic-Wells Association =

The Vic-Wells Association (VWA) was founded in 1922 and supports the work of the Old Vic and Sadler's Wells theatres.

== Early history ==
The Vic-Wells Association (VWA) was founded as the Old Vic Association during the 1922-3 theatre season. Lilian Baylis, who then managed the Old Vic, established the organisation to build relations between audiences and performers at the Old Vic. The Old Vic Association ran several events during the year; the annual Twelfth Night Party, on or around 6 January, was particularly popular as was Shakespeare's birthday on or around 23 April. The latter usually featured a host of Old Vic performers reciting famous speeches and scenes from Shakespeare. However, the Old Vic Association also began building an archive of material associated with the drama, dance and opera performed at the Old Vic. The Association published the Old Vic Magazine, first published in October 1919, and Baylis persuaded directors, performers, designers, and backstage crew to write short articles on the roles they were playing, singing or dancing; plays they were directing or designing; and reminiscences about previous experiences in the theatre.

In 1931, when Baylis re-opened the Sadler's Wells theatre, the Old Vic Association became the Vic-Wells Association and the magazine was renamed The Vic-Wells Magazine. Under this name, the magazine continued publication until the start of the Second World War. Leading performers continued to write for the magazine; for example, Robert Helpmann reminisced about touring Australia as a fifteen year old, dancing on the same stage as Anna Pavlova; Ethel Smyth asked 'Is Opera a Wash-Out in England?'. Peggy Ashcroft discussed 'My First Repertory Season'. The VWA also published two short histories by Edwin Fagg - one of Sadler's Wells theatre and one of the Old Vic. The VWA arranged many special interest lectures and in 1983 Ninette de Valois reminisced about how nervous she was when invited by the VWA to give her 'first public address in the rehearsal room at the Old Vic'.

== Post-WWII history ==
After the Second World War, the Old Vic and Sadler's Wells companies diverged, eventually forming the English National Theatre, The Vic-Wells Ballet (the predecessor of The Royal Ballet, The Royal Ballet School and the Birmingham Royal Ballet) and the Sadler's Wells Opera Company (which became the English National Opera). However, the VWA Newsletter continued covering activities at both the Old Vic and Sadler's Wells. The historian Reginald P. Mander gathered reminiscences and anecdotes from chorus girls and stars and the VWA Newsletter is the source for the story about Lilian Baylis's aunt, Emma Cons, not replying to Charlie Chaplin when he applied to work at the Old Vic because he didn't include a stamped addressed envelope. The VWA also hosted special performances such as the first complete UK stage reading of Dylan Thomas' Under Milk Wood at The Old Vic in 1954, starring Richard Burton, Emlyn Williams, Sybil Thorndike and Rachel Roberts, performed on 28 February and 17 March 1954, directed by Douglas Cleverdon and adapted by Philip Burton. Another VWA event was a performance of John Webster's The White Devil on 5 March 1961, at the Old Vic, featuring Stephen Moore and Barbara Leigh-Hunt and directed by Peter Ellis. Meanwhile, at Sadler's Wells, the VWA supported the European premiere of John Joubert's opera, Silas Marner, in a workshop performance.

By 1982, the VWA owned a substantial archive which it donated to several special collections. For example, Leslie Gordon's colour film made during dress rehearsals for the opera and ballet during 1936-8 was deposited with the National Film Archive (VWA Newsletter January/ February 1983 p. 7) at the British Film Institute. This film, clips of which can be viewed via the Vic-Wells Association YouTube page, includes a brief glimpse of Ninette de Valois dancing the role of Webster in The Wedding Bouquet. A major collection of clippings, playbills, scrapbooks, photographs and other theatre ephemera was donated to the Theatre Museum. Another major collection was donated to the Islington Local History Centre Special Collections

The VWA also managed The Lilian Baylis Trust and the Ninette de Valois Trust, which made occasional grants and donations: for example, in 1994 the VWA sponsored the commissioning of Pendragon for the National Youth Music Theatre. in 2005 an award was made to then emerging choreographer Liam Scarlett. In 2011, the VWA subsidised a restaging of W.B.Yeats's 1934 dance play The King of the Great Clock Tower at the Royal Ballet School, directed by Richard Cave. Awards have also been made to the ENO’s Harewood Artist programme and the Birmingham Royal Ballet Dreams programme for young people.

In 2025 the VWA restructured into an online association focussing on archiving and offering grants to creative and critical projects connected with the Old Vic, Sadler’s Wells and the theatres’ illustrious histories.
