= Conference of Drama Schools =

Schools in the United Kingdom

- Abbreviation: CDS
- Merged into: National Council for Drama Training
- Successor: Drama UK
- Formation: 1969
- Dissolved: 31 July 2012
- Type: Association
- Headquarters: The Spotlight, 7 Leicester Place, London, WC2H 7RJ
- Location: England
- Region served: United Kingdom

The Conference of Drama Schools (CDS) was the organisation which represented the top 21 accredited UK drama schools in the United Kingdom from 1969 until 2012.

== History ==
Originally founded in 1969 as an educational charitable organization it changed to company status on the 29 June 2000, originally the 22 member schools offered courses in acting, musical theatre, directing, and technical theatre. On 31 July 2012, it merged with the National Council for Drama Training to form Drama UK.

== Members ==
1. Academy of Live and Recorded Arts (ALRA)
2. The Arts Educational Schools (ArtsEd)
3. Birmingham School of Acting
4. Bristol Old Vic Theatre School (BOVTS)
5. Cygnet Training Theatre
6. Drama Centre London
7. Drama Studio London (DSL)
8. East 15 Acting School (E15)
9. Guildford School of Acting (GSA)
10. Guildhall School of Music and Drama (GSMD)
11. Italia Conti Academy of Theatre Arts
12. London Academy of Music and Dramatic Art (LAMDA)
13. The Manchester Metropolitan School of Theatre (The Manchester School of Theatre // ManMet)
14. Mountview Academy of Theatre Arts
15. The Oxford School of Drama
16. Queen Margaret University School of Drama and Creative Industries
17. Royal Academy of Dramatic Art (RADA)
18. Rose Bruford College (RBC)
19. Royal Central School of Speech and Drama (RCSSD)
20. Royal Conservatoire of Scotland (formerly RSAMD)
21. Royal Welsh College of Music & Drama (RWCMD)

== Sources ==
- Richardson, Jean (1998). Careers in the Theatre. Kogan Page Publishers. ISBN 9780749424206
- The Conference of Drama Schools
