= Drama UK =

- Abbreviation: NCDT
- Merged into: Conference of Drama Schools, National Council for Drama Training
- Successor: Federation of Drama Schools
- Formation: 31 July 2012
- Dissolved: 13 June 2017
- Type: partnership
- Purpose: Championing quality drama training in the UK through Advocacy, Assurance and Advice
- Headquarters: London
- Location: England
- Region served: United Kingdom
- Website: www.dramauk.co.uk

Drama UK was an advocate for vocational drama training in the UK, as well as providing accreditation for vocational drama courses, from 2012 to 2016.

== History ==
Drama UK was formed on 31 July 2012, by the merger of the two main organizations in the United Kingdom responsible for drama training (Conference of Drama Schools) and accreditation of officially recognized courses (National Council for Drama Training). The accreditation body dissolved in 2016 after a period of instability in which several high-profile schools quit the organisation. In June 2017, Drama UK was replaced by the Federation of Drama Schools.

== Quality Assurance ==
For over 35 years, Drama UK (formerly the National Council for Drama Training) has been providing assurance for students, their parents and funders that courses that have passed their quality assurance process are adequately preparing students for careers in the drama profession.

There are 2 quality marks awarded by Drama UK：

=== Accreditation ===
Accreditation is a quality mark which is only awarded to vocational courses which offer a conservatoire level of training.

Currently three year and occasionally two year courses in Acting or Musical Theatre (MT) and two or three year technical courses that balance a broad understanding with sufficient skills to enter the profession are eligible to be accredited.

=== Recognition ===
Recognition is a quality mark which is awarded to performing and technical theatre arts undergraduate and postgraduate Higher and Further Education courses. These are high quality performance courses which provide a pipeline of talent into the creative industries but that are outside the conservatoire level of vocational training.

== Members ==
1. Academy of Live and Recorded Arts (ALRA)
2. The Arts Educational Schools (ArtsEd)
3. Birmingham School of Acting
4. Bristol Old Vic Theatre School
5. Cygnet Training Theatre
6. Drama Centre London
7. Drama Studio London
8. East 15 Acting School (E15)
9. Guildford School of Acting (GSA)
10. Guildhall School of Music and Drama
11. Italia Conti Academy of Theatre Arts
12. London Academy of Music and Dramatic Art (LAMDA)
13. Liverpool Institute for Performing Arts (LIPA)
14. The Manchester Metropolitan School of Theatre (The Manchester School of Theatre // ManMet)
15. Mountview Academy of Theatre Arts
16. The Oxford School of Drama
17. Project A
18. Queen Margaret University
19. Royal Academy of Dramatic Art (RADA)
20. Rose Bruford College
21. Royal Central School of Speech and Drama (RCSSD)
22. Royal Conservatoire of Scotland (RCS; formerly RSAMD)
23. Royal Welsh College of Music and Drama (RWCMD)
