= Academy of Live and Recorded Arts =

British drama school

The Academy of Live and Recorded Arts, London Acting & Drama School
- Type: Drama school
- Active: 1979–2022
- Founders: Sorrel Carson and Caryll Ziegler
- Affiliations: Trinity College London, CDET, Federation of Drama Schools, St Mary's University, Twickenham
- Location: Wandsworth, SW18 3SX, England
- Website: alra.co.uk
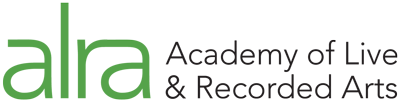

The Academy of Live and Recorded Arts (ALRA) was a British drama school. It had two sites: ALRA South on Wandsworth Common in south London and ALRA North in Wigan, Greater Manchester. It was founded in 1979 by director and actors Sorrel Carson and Caryll Ziegler who then directed the school as its principal until 2001.

ALRA was a member of Federation of Drama Schools an iteration of the formerly known as Drama UK, and before that the Conference of Drama Schools, and National Council for Drama Training, both organizations since dissolved, and received funding from the Young People's Learning Agency.

The school closed in April 2022.

== Origins and locations ==
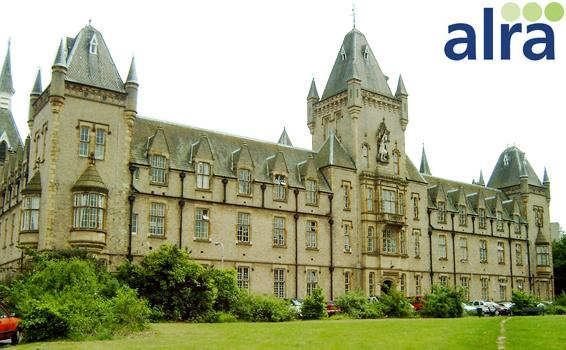
ALRA South occupied part of this former orphanage in Wandsworth

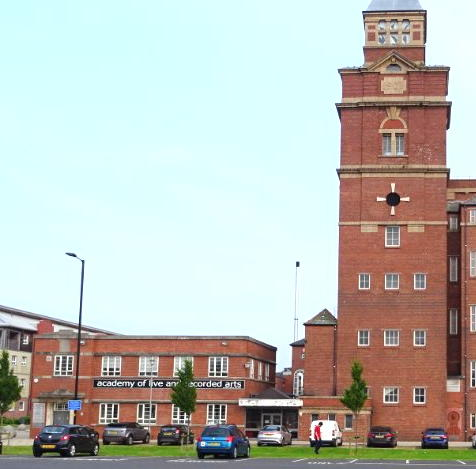
ALRA North, 2012–2022 (left)

ALRA South was in the Royal Victoria Patriotic Building, a Victorian Gothic Grade II listed building on the edge of Wandsworth Common. The first school was opened in a Church Hall in East Finchley in 1979.

ALRA North opened in September 2010 at a former church in Wigan, Greater Manchester, moving in 2012 to Trencherfield Mill, a restored industrial building in the Wigan Pier development area, Greater Manchester. The curriculum and teaching methods were the same as at ALRA South.

== Courses ==
ALRA offered the following courses:

- Three-year Acting course – leading to BA (Hons) Acting/National Diploma in Professional Acting
- Fifteen-month Acting course – leading to MA Professional Acting/National Certificate in Professional Acting
- MA in Directing
- Foundation Acting
- Foundation Stage Management and Technical Theatre
- Various short courses.

== Acceptance ==
Admission to the school was based on three rounds of auditions and finally an interview with the school's directors, its registrar and an audition panel. The audition was held over the course of a single day.

== Closure ==
ALRA closed with effect from 4 April 2022. Students were offered the chance to complete their studies at Rose Bruford College. The Federation of Drama Schools, in conjunction with the UK's Office for Students, offered support to staff and students affected by the announcement, including maintaining the arrangement with St Mary's University, Twickenham for validating degrees.

The last principal was Dr. Ellie Johnson Searle (interim).

== Notable alumni ==
- Jimmy Akingbola
- Samuel Anderson
- Clive Ashborn
- Bennett Arron
- Anna Brecon
- Lorraine Bruce
- Dominic Burgess
- Rhiannon Clements
- Stephanie Chambers
- Ian Champion
- Bridget Christie
- Thomas Craig
- Amanda Eliasch
- Tanya Franks
- Francesca Gonshaw
- Denise Gough
- Miranda Hart
- Daniel Healy
- Joanna Jeffrees
- Elizabeth Keates
- Lucy Liemann
- Robert Lonsdale
- Kim Lukas
- Paul McEwan
- Steve McNeil
- Sarah Parish
- Mark Pegg
- Pooky Quesnel
- Lisa Ray
- Vincent Regan
- Suzi Ruffell
- Georgia Steel
- Amita Suman
- Hannah Waddingham
