= Italia Conti Academy of Theatre Arts =

Italia Conti
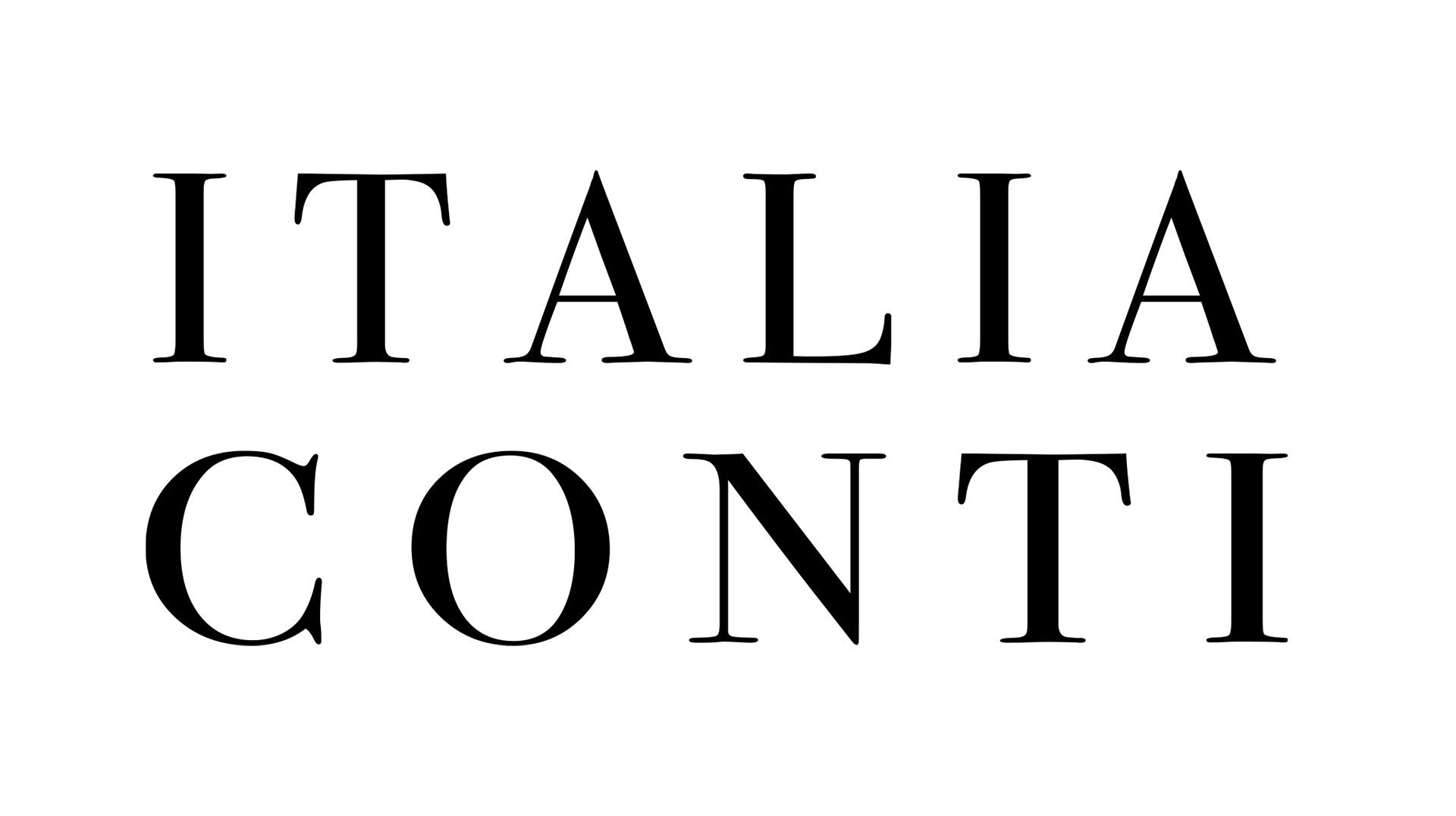

Location
- Italia Conti, 2 Henry Plaza, Victoria Way; Woking, Surrey, GU21 6BU; United Kingdom; 51.318984°N 0.560868°W

Information
- Type: Further Education, Higher Education, Conservatoire-style, Performing Arts, Actor Training,
- Established: 1911
- Founder: Italia Emily Stella Conti
- Specialist: Acting, Musical Theatre, Dance
- Principal/CEO: Hayley Newton-Jarvis
- COO: Miranda Tatton-Brown
- Vice Principals: Bradley Hawkins, Dan Fulham
- Age: 16 (FE), 18 (HE)+
- Affiliations: Federation of Drama Schools
- Website: italiaconti.com

The Italia Conti Academy of Theatre Arts, also known simply as Italia Conti, is a drama school based in Woking, England. It was founded by the English actress Italia Conti in 1911. Italia Conti offers courses in acting, musical theatre, and dance, catering mostly for 16+ and 18+ students through its higher education programmes, and for younger learners (3–18 years) through its Associate Schools and pre-vocational courses.

Italia Conti is a member of the Federation of Drama Schools formerly Drama UK, and accredited by the Council for Dance, Drama and Musical Theatre (CDMT). Italia Conti was a member of National Council for Drama Training (NCDT) before the organisation dissolved in 2012.

Originally based in London, the institution has occupied various premises throughout its history. In August 2022, Italia Conti consolidated its operations into a new facility in Woking, Surrey, which includes specialised studios for dance, acting, and musical theatre, as well as recording and television production spaces.

== History ==
In 1981, the academy started running Junior and Musical Theatre courses in Islington. The BA (Hons) Acting and CertHe Intro to Acting courses continued to be delivered from the Avondale site in Clapham. In August 2022, all courses moved to Woking.

== Courses ==
=== Main provision ===
The following courses taught at the academy were validated by the University of East London, and accredited by the Federation of Drama Schools.

- BA (Hons) Acting Course, introduced 1994, a three-year full-time professional actor's training for students over the age of 18.
- CertHE Intro to Acting Programme, a year-long full-time course that serves as a preparation and foundation training for students aged 18 and above, formerly known as a Foundation Acting Course.
- BA (Hons) Musical Theatre Course, introduced 2018, a three-year full-time professional musical theatre training for students above the age of 18.
- CertHE Musical Theatre Performance, introduced 2021, a one-year full-time preparation and foundation training for students above the age of 18.
- BA (Hons) Professional Arts Practice (Top-up), from 2022, allowing students to progress from a Level 5 or Level 6 non degree qualification, to a BA (Hons).

=== Theatre Arts School (for Juniors) ===
The Theatre Arts School, also known as the "Juniors", was a co-educational independent school for pupils aged from 10 to 16 years old. The Theatre Arts School was first located in the Avondale building in Clapham, London and then at Goswell House, Barbican, London. The school was accredited by the Independent Schools Council and monitored by the Independent Schools Inspectorate. Pupils would follow an academic curriculum to ensure they graduated with qualifications whilst also studying a range of performance skills. In May 2020, during the COVID-19 pandemic, it was announced that the Theatre Arts school would close in the summer of 2021 after 109 years.

== Buildings and facilities ==
=== Woking, Surrey (New Building) ===
In August 2022, Italia Conti moved to a new facility in Henry Plaza, Woking, Surrey. This facility brings together the School of Acting, which was previously delivered from the Avondale Building in Clapham North, London, and the School of Musical Theatre & Dance that was split between Barbican, London, and Guildford, Surrey sites.

=== Previous locations ===
- Great Portland Street, London, 1911–1930
- Church building in Lamb's Conduit Street, 1931–1941
- 12 Archer Street, London, 1945–1972
- Avondale, Clapham, 1960–2022
- Landor Road, Clapham, London, from 1972
- Italia Conti House ("the academy"), in Goswell Road, Islington, London, 1981–2022
- The Italia Conti Arts Centre in Guildford, which housed Musical theatre and Performing arts with Dance Teacher Training Courses

== Italia Conti Associates ==
In 1995, the Italia Conti Associate Schools were founded, which deliver the same style of courses as in the main academy.

Listed below are the locations of associate school branches which take place around the country and provide courses in part-time performing arts training:

- Italia Conti Associates Battersea, London
- Italia Conti Associates Bishop's Stortford
- Italia Conti Associates Brighton & Hove
- Italia Conti Associates Chislehurst at Coopers School, Chislehurst, London
- Italia Conti Associates Guildford, Surrey
- Italia Conti Associates Newbury at St Bartholomew's School, Newbury, Berkshire
- Italia Conti Associates Newcastle
- Italia Conti Associates Petersfield
- Italia Conti Associates Plymouth at Lipson Co-operative Academy, Plymouth, Devon
- Italia Conti Associates Reigate at Reigate School, Reigate, Surrey
- Italia Conti Associates Rugby
- Italia Conti Associates Ruislip
- Italia Conti Associates Tunbridge Wells at the Skinners School, Royal Tunbridge Wells, Kent
- Italia Conti Associates Woking at Italia Conti's main premises in Woking, Surrey

== School for Stars ==
The CBBC series School for Stars followed pupils at the Italia Conti Academy of Theatre Arts, showcasing the school's activities and featuring events from the students' day-to-day lives. Each series followed a set of students during the school term. The series mainly featured the Theatre Arts School (Juniors) and occasionally featured students from the various 16+ courses. School For Stars first aired in 2011, and a third series began on 2 September 2013. The show was narrated by Reggie Yates.

== See also ==
- Alumni of the Italia Conti Academy of Theatre Arts
