= Central Saint Martins =

Public tertiary art school in London, England

Coordinates: 51°32′8″N 0°7′30″W

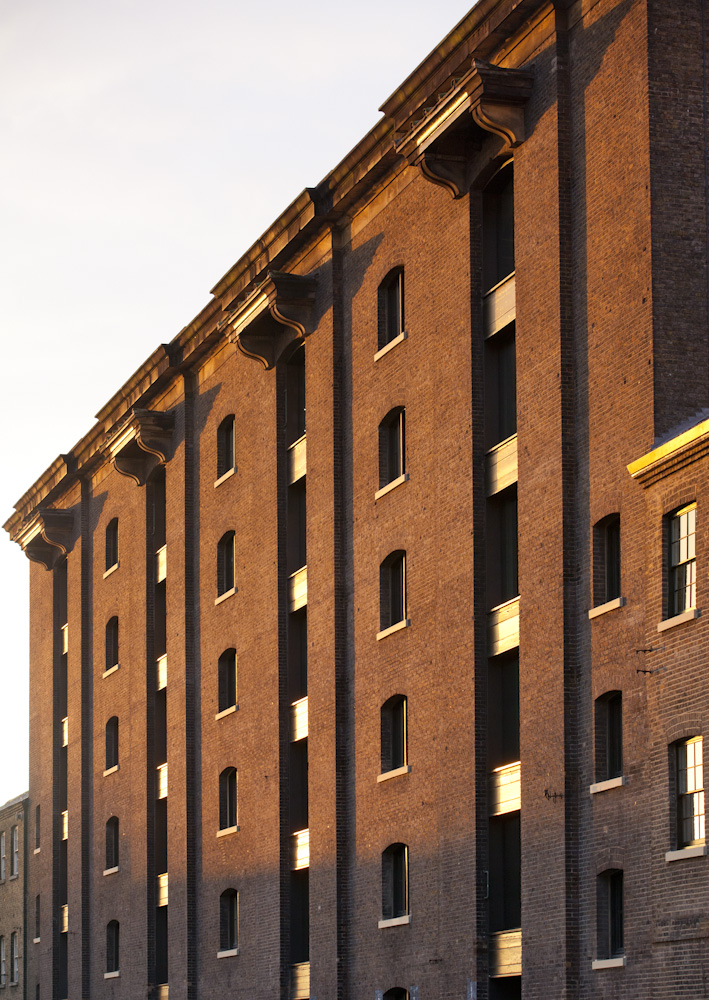
- King's Cross campus of Central Saint Martins
- Established: 1854 – Saint Martin's School of Art; 1896 – Central School of Art and Design; 1910 – Byam Shaw School of Art; 1963 – Drama Centre London; 1989 – Central Saint Martins
- Parent institution: University of the Arts London
- Head: Rathna Ramanathan
- Location: London, United Kingdom
- Campus: Urban
- Address: Granary Building, 1 Granary Square, King's Cross, London, N1C 4AA
- Website: arts.ac.uk/csm
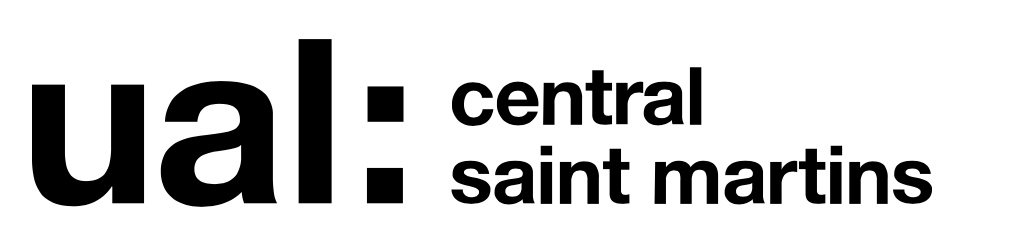

Central Saint Martins is a constituent college of the University of the Arts London, a public art university in London, England. The college offers full-time courses at foundation, undergraduate, and postgraduate levels, as well as a variety of short and summer courses.

It was formerly known as Central Saint Martins College of Arts and Design, and before that as Central Saint Martins College of Art and Design.

== History ==
Central Saint Martins College of Art and Design was formed in 1989 from the merger of the Central School of Art and Design, founded in 1896, and Saint Martin's School of Art, founded in 1854. Since 1986, both schools had been part of the London Institute, formed by the Inner London Education Authority to bring together seven London art, design, fashion, and media schools. The London Institute became a legal entity in 1988, could award taught degrees from 1993, was granted university status in 2003, and was renamed the University of the Arts London in 2004. It also includes Camberwell College of Arts, Chelsea College of Arts, the London College of Communication, the London College of Fashion, and Wimbledon College of Arts.

The Drama Centre London, founded in 1963, joined Central Saint Martins in 1999 as an integral school, maintaining its name and teaching approaches. The Byam Shaw School of Art, founded in 1910, was merged into Central Saint Martins in 2003.

=== Central School of Art and Design ===
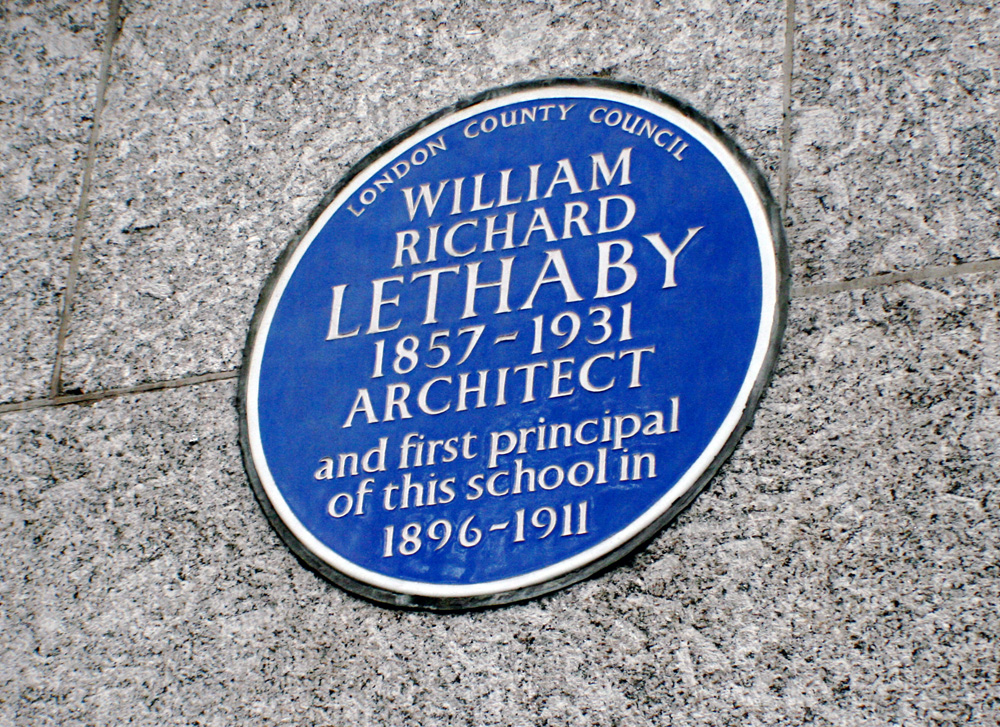
Central School of Art and Design, Southampton Row, Holborn, London WC1B 4AP: Blue Plaque for William Lethaby, first principal of the Central School of Arts and Crafts, placed by the London County Council in 1957

The Central School of Art and Design was established as the Central School of Arts and Crafts in 1896 by the London County Council. It grew directly from the Arts and Crafts movement of William Morris and John Ruskin. The first principal, from 1896 until 1911, was William Richard Lethaby; a blue plaque in his memory was erected in 1957. The school was at first housed in Morley Hall, rented from the Regent Street Polytechnic. It moved to purpose-built premises in Southampton Row, in the London Borough of Camden, in 1908. In the same year, the Royal Female School of Art, established in 1842, was merged into the school. Central became part of the London Institute in 1986 and merged with Saint Martin's in 1989.

=== Saint Martin's School of Art ===
Saint Martin's School of Art was established in 1854 by Henry Mackenzie, vicar of the church of St Martin-in-the-Fields. It became independent from the church in 1859. Frank Martin became head of the sculpture department in 1952; he brought in young sculptors and recent graduates of the department as teachers. Among these, Anthony Caro was particularly influential. The group around him came to be known as the New Generation of British sculptors, and the sculpture department of Saint Martin's became, in the words of Tim Scott, 'the most famous in the art world'. Saint Martin's became part of the London Institute in 1986 and merged with Central in 1989.

=== Drama Centre London ===
The Drama Centre London was founded in 1963 by a breakaway group of teachers and students from the Central School of Speech and Drama, led by John Blatchley, Yat Malmgren, and Christopher Fettes. The school was a member of Drama UK, and its undergraduate acting course was accredited by Drama UK. The Drama Centre London merged with Central Saint Martins in 1999. The University of the Arts London decided in 2020 to close it.

=== Byam Shaw School of Art ===
The Byam Shaw School of Art was founded by the artists Byam Shaw and Rex Vicat Cole in 1910 as a school of drawing and painting. It was originally located in Campden Street, Kensington, and moved to larger premises in Archway in 1990. It was subsumed by Central Saint Martins in 2003.

== Awards and assessment ==
In 1998, the London Institute received a Queen's Anniversary Prize for the 'massive contribution' of Central Saint Martins College of Art & Design to the growth of the fashion industry in Britain. The University of the Arts London received a Queen's Anniversary Prize in 2013, for the contribution of CSM industrial and product design graduates to commerce, industry, and the design profession.

CSM does not receive independent assessment in the Complete University Guide league tables, but is ranked as part of the University of the Arts London. In 2014, the university received an overall ranking of 67 out of 124 institutions, with a rank of 102 for graduate prospects and 123 for student satisfaction with teaching. In 2018, it was placed 83rd out of 129 universities, with a rank of 125 for student satisfaction.

== Schools and location ==
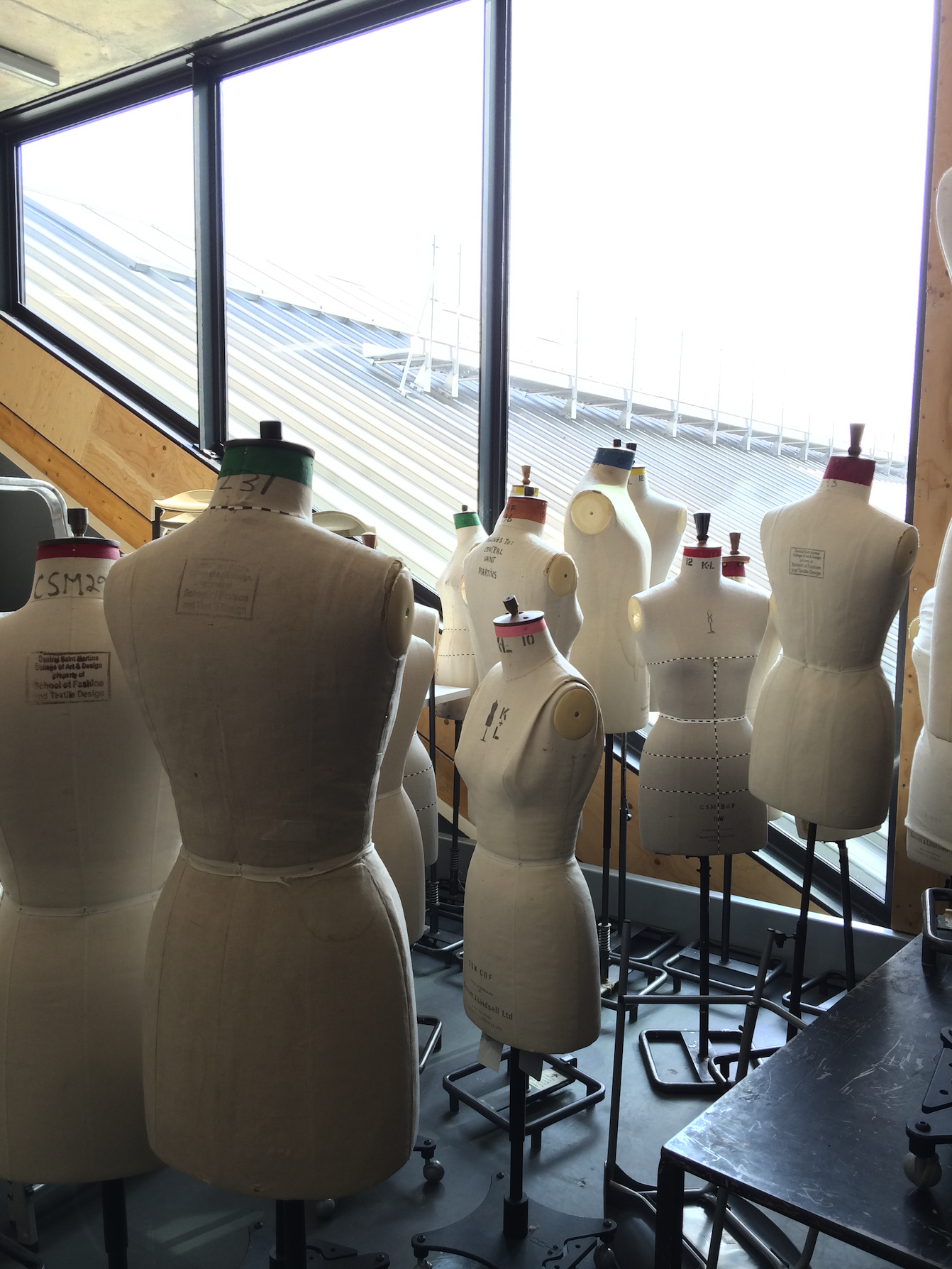
Tailor's dummies in a fashion studio

As of 2014, teaching at Central Saint Martins is organised into nine programmes, which include acting, art, design, fashion, graphics, jewellery, and textiles, as well as foundation courses.

Central Saint Martins moved to a converted warehouse complex on Granary Square at King's Cross in 2011. Most of the college is housed there, but it also uses the former Byam Shaw building in Elthorne Road, Archway, and premises in Richbell Place, Holborn.

== Alumni ==
Among the alumni of the school are the Turner Prize winner Laure Prouvost, the musician Jarvis Cocker, and many fashion designers, including John Galliano, Stella McCartney, Alexander McQueen, Zac Posen and Riccardo Tisci.

== Teaching staff ==
- Jeremy Till
- Esme Young
