= Elizabeth Keates =

Elizabeth Keates (born 12 June) is a British actress. She was born in Otley, West Yorkshire, England. She was educated at Benton Park School and after A-Levels Elizabeth left Leeds to study at The Academy of Live and Recorded Arts (ALRA) drama school in London. Since then her theatre credits have included performances at the Old Vic and the Stephen Joseph. Elizabeth achieved critical acclaim for her role as Ophelia at the Dukes Theatre Lancaster.

After graduating from ALRA, Keates set up LK Productions Theatre Company, which produced 5 annual touring productions, employing over 30 actors.

Alongside her role as artistic director of LK Productions, Keates continued working as an actress; for the BBC on Slave Island, (the story of the African Burial Ground) Chariot Queen, in which she played the title role, Blood of the Vikings and Meet the Ancestors – Bones in a Barnyard. It was on the filming of this BBC programme that Keates met her husband, Broadway actor Mark Rawlings, the couple now have a daughter, Willow Darcie, born February 2010.

Film work includes Boudica (Indigo Films L.A) and the award-winning film The Tomb Robbery Papyrus: notes of a past, which opened in London on 17 April 2011. Keates's name can be found in the records held at the British Film Catalogue for her work with White Lyon Films.

In 2011 Keates starred in the York Theatre Royal production of The Railway Children (The Mike Kenny (writer) adaptation) playing opposite Marshall Lancaster in the role of Mrs Perks. This was performed live at Waterloo International railway station, and the production won an Olivier Award for 'Best Entertainment' in 2011. Elizabeth had previously worked with director Damian Cruden at York Theatre Royal in Pygmalion.

In July 2012 Keates reprised her role as Mrs Perks in The Railway Children playing opposite Marcus Brigstoke and Mark Benton.
