= CDMT =

UK dance and theatre professional association

- Formation: 1979
- Type: Qualification awarding body
- Legal status: Nonprofit organization
- Location(s): Salters' Hall; 4 London Wall Place; London; EC2Y 5AU; United Kingdom
- Region served: United Kingdom
- Board of directors: "CDMT Trustees & Staff".
- Website: Official website

The Council for Dance, Drama and Musical Theatre (CDMT), formerly known as the Council for Dance Education and Training (CDET), is the quality assurance and membership body for the professional dance, drama and musical theatre industries in the United Kingdom. CDMT was founded in 1979. The organisation accredits full-time performing arts schools, validates awarding organisations, and advocates on behalf of the sector.

== Overview ==
- Accredits excellent professional training at full-time dance, drama and musical theatre schools—providing the industry benchmark of quality since 1979
- Validates the world's leading awarding organisations which offer performing arts qualifications
- Works with Affiliates and Collaborative Bodies to develop the highest standards of programme provision across the performing arts
- Recognises, by means of the Recognised Awards Scheme, pre-vocational dance, drama and musical theatre schools and teachers
- Provides membership and other specialist services through the Conference of Professional Dance Schools, Awarding Organisations Committee, Steering Group for the Dance and Drama Awards (DaDA), Affiliate meetings and Graded Examinations Forum
- Negotiates with government authorities on issues of education funding, policy and regulation
- Manages a substantial public-facing online platform which promotes members and core services, as well as administering two information websites for DaDA dadainfo.org.uk and Graded Examinations gradedexams.com respectively
- Publishes the UK Guide which is the definitive resource for those seeking information on quality provision in the sector (this is sponsored by Spotlight)
- Operates a free comprehensive information service for students, parents, teachers, artists and employers

== History ==
In 1979, alarmed at the indifferent quality of what was being presented as appropriate professional training and education in dance, musical theatre and the related performing arts, a number of artists met with representatives of leading industry organisations to discuss how the sector could work together to ensure high standards of provision. What emerged was CDMT. Over the years CDMT has become the first point of contact for employers, students and teachers seeking information about high quality training, education and assessment not only dance and musical theatre, but also drama across the UK.

== Mission ==
The organisation works hand in hand with Accredited Schools and Validated Awarding organisations to ensure that professional training and assessments both remain abreast of current industry trends and, importantly, address the real world needs of employers, with the purpose of securing the supply of high quality practitioners for the future.

=== Accredited Schools ===
CDMT ensures the provision of high quality professional dance, drama and musical theatre training through the accreditation of full-time performing arts schools. Accreditation is only awarded to those schools and colleges that have successfully undertaken a thorough and comprehensive institutional-level review by a panel of nominated industry experts.

=== Validated Awarding Organisations ===
CDMT validates awarding organisations that offer graded vocational and diploma examinations in dance music theatre and the performing arts. Its validation process includes quality assurance inspections and annual comparability studies of assessment standards.

=== Affiliates ===
Affiliates are committed to working with CDMT to develop the highest standards in their scrutinised courses. Some programmes focus on progression towards a specific role in the performing arts, others encourage reflective practice in a work-based context, including continuing professional development, whilst others develop skills in research and analysis which contribute to the sector’s wider understanding of its history and contextual influences.

=== Recognised Awards scheme ===
The Recognised Awards engage pre-vocational schools delivering provision across the performing arts, with associated teachers holding specialist teaching diplomas in dance, drama, musical theatre and music. This self-certification scheme makes a valuable contribution to the development of safe and professional standards of practice in pre- or non-vocational teaching settings.

== Advocacy ==
Advocacy on behalf of the sector is a significant CDMT undertaking. The organisation provides a UK-wide forum in which authorities, educators and employers can come together to discuss common concerns and work strategically to promote training, education and assessment. Membership services are coordinated through the Conference of Professional Schools, Awarding Organisations Committee and affiliate meetings.

=== CDMT website ===
cdmt.org.uk is the primary source of up-to-date information on high quality provision across the sector, including an up-to-date list of membership and initiatives.

=== UK Guide ===
CDMT publishes the annual UK Guide to professional training, education and assessment in dance, drama and musical theatre which is the definitive resource for those seeking information on quality provision in the sector. The publication is sponsored by Spotlight.

=== Dance and Drama Awards (DaDA) ===
CDMT administers the steering group for the Dance and Drama Awards (DaDA) on behalf of members, which involves facilitating communications between the Education Funding Agency and schools delivering dance, drama and musical theatre courses within the scheme; developing briefing papers on funding for government ministers; and administering the DaDA information website dadainfo.org.uk on behalf of stakeholders.

=== Graded Examinations booklet and website ===
CDMT coordinates and progresses cooperation across all Ofqual recognised organisations awarding graded examinations in dance, drama, music and musical theatre. Projects to date include the booklet Graded Exams: The Definitive Guide, its associated website gradedexams.com and many detailed sector reports.

=== Careers Conferences and Showcase Performances ===
The most recent Careers Conference took place at the Liverpool Institute of Performing Arts in November 2017 which disseminated up-to-date guidance on careers, funding and training opportunities for prospective students and their parents, culminating in showcase performances by current students of CDMT Accredited Schools. Previous conferences have taken place at the Hammond, Chester, Elmhurst Ballet School, Birmingham. The next Careers Conference is organised for the Urdang Academy, at the Shaw Theatre, London on 25 November 2018.

== Classifications ==
CDMT members collectively keep professional training and rigorous assessment as the two cornerstones of a progression route to a career in the performing arts.

=== Accredited Schools ===
- ALRA - Academy of Live and Recorded Arts
- Arden School of Theatre
- Arts Educational Schools, London
- Bird College
- Bodywork Company Performing Arts Cambridge, UK
- CPA Studios
- Creative Academy
- D&B Performing Arts
- Drama Studio London
- Elmhurst Ballet School
- English National Ballet School
- The Hammond
- Italia Conti Academy of Theatre Arts (Avondale)
- Italia Conti Academy of Theatre Arts (Barbican)
- Italia Conti Arts Centre
- KS Dance
- Laine Theatre Arts
- Liverpool Institute for Performing Arts
- Liverpool Theatre School and College
- London Studio Centre
- Masters Performing Arts College
- The Scottish Institute of Theatre, Dance, Film and Television
- Midlands Academy of Dance and Drama
- Millennium Performing Arts
- Mountview Academy of Theatre Arts
- Northern Ballet School
- Performers College
- SLP College
- Stella Mann College
- Tring Park School for the Performing Arts
- Urdang Academy

=== Validated awarding organisations ===
CDMT validates offers graded, vocational and diploma examinations in the performing arts, carrying out quality assurance inspections and annual comparability studies of assessment standards.

- British Association of Teachers of Dancing (BATD)
- bbodance
- British Theatre Dance Association (BTDA)
- Graded Qualifications Alliance (GQAL)
- Imperial Society of Teachers of Dancing (ISTD)
- International Dance Teachers' Association (IDTA)
- National Association of Teachers of Dancing (NATD)
- Professional Teachers of Dancing (PTD)
- RSL (Performance Arts Awards)
- Royal Academy of Dance (RAD)
- Russian Ballet Society (RBS)
- Scottish Dance Teachers' Alliance (SDTA)
- Spanish Dance Society (SDS)
- Trinity College London (TCL)
- United Kingdom Alliance (UKA)
- United Teachers of Dance (UTD)

=== Affiliates ===
Some Affiliate programmes such as Access to Professional Training and Performing Arts Training focus on progression towards a specific role. Others, including Continuing Professional Development encourage reflective practice in a work-based context. Higher Education modules help users develop skills in research and analysis.

- Anne Walker MBE
- The Centre Performing Arts College
- International Dance Supplies Ltd
- Magpie Dance
- Mandy Ellen Performing Arts
- Melody Movement Early Learning Ltd
- Jason Thomas Performing Arts
- Reynolds Training Academy
- Safe in Dance International (SiDI)
- WAC Performing Arts and Media College
- Wilkes Academy
