= Abigail Ozora Simpson =

English contemporary sculptor

Abigail Ozora Simpson (born 1964 in London) is a contemporary sculptor working in clay.

== Biography ==
Ozora Simpson studied acting at the Drama Centre, London (1983–1987). A stage career gave way to art as she developed an affinity for working with clay. She set up her own studio in London's Hoxton and worked as part of an artist collective at Standpoint Studios. International exhibitions and recognition led to The Observer describing Ozora Simpson as 'The It Girl of Ceramics'. In 2008 she moved to Kent. She works from an old ice-cream factory in Margate.

== Style and technique ==
Ozora Simpson's large scale ceramic sculptures are constructed by hand from stoneware clay. Reminiscent of traditional African techniques, each sculpture is formed of single weighty coils. The hand rolled coils are carefully kneaded into place and left to dry before the next is added. The prints of her fingers and palms often remain a pattern on the works. Each sculpture is unique and can take between three weeks and three months to make. They are shaped, smoothed and scraped and then glazed. The sculptures are then fired up to three times at 1280 degrees in Ozora Simpson's purpose built kiln.

== Influences ==
Ozora Simpson cites her influences as fashion, architecture and the female form. Equally, she credits her parents as crucial to her approach to her art. Gallerist Rebecca Willer has recognized how she makes ‘contemporary reference to timeless classical forms’ and has complimented ‘her ability to coax sensuous and elegant shapes from clay.’
