= Sorrel Carson =

Sorrel Carson (Mar 1920 – 12 April 2005) was the Irish actress, director and teacher who formed the Academy of Live and Recorded Art in London in 1979.

== Early career ==
Carson trained as an actress in the Ben Greet Academy of Acting, her first professional engagement with the Sheffield Repertory Theatre came just before the outbreak of World War II. During the conflict she was a member of ENSA, performing in many plays to entertain the troops.

== Acting ==
Bertolt Brecht’s wife Helene Weigel invited Carson to join her husband’s Berliner Ensemble for their production of J M Synge’s The Playboy of the Western World. She always insisted that this enlightening experience was to influence her work henceforth both as an actress and a director.

== ALRA ==
After a long stint directing plays in the seventies at both the Mercury Theatre and the Young Vic she started to teach. In 1979 she set up ALRA in London's Royal Victoria Patriotic Building and with the Patronage of her great friend Joan Littlewood was principal there until her retirement in 2000. ALRA was unique in that its curriculum combined classic theatrical training with both the ensemble modernist approach of Littlewood's Theatre Workshop and acting for camera. This gave its students an advantage auditioning for their first television jobs. Actors such as Vincent Regan, Sarah Parish and Miranda Hart all benefitted from Carson's "acting is reacting" methodology.
