= Benton Park School =

Community school in Rawdon, West Yorkshire, England

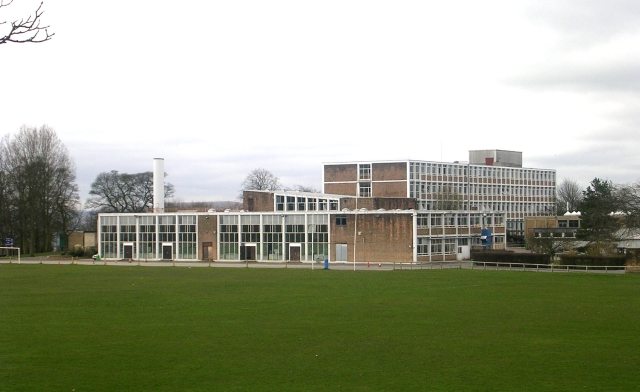
- Benton Park School in 2009

Location
- Harrogate Road; Rawdon, West Yorkshire, LS19 6LX; England
- Coordinates: 53.8558°N 1.6829°W

Information
- Type: Community school
- Established: 11 March 1961
- Local authority: Leeds City Council
- Department for Education URN: 108083 Tables
- Ofsted: Reports
- Headteacher: Nicholas Skilton
- Gender: Coeducational
- Age: 11 to 18
- Enrolment: 1,496 as of February 2023
- Website: http://www.bentonpark.org.uk

Benton Park School is a coeducational secondary school and sixth form located in Rawdon, West Yorkshire, England. Formerly a technology college, it has over 1,400 students.

== Status and awards ==
The school achieved Beacon status in 1998. The school gained Technology College status in 2002, after the head teacher advertised in Private Eye for sponsorship for the Technology College application

Awards received include Sportsmark Award, Artsmark Gold and International School Award.

== History ==
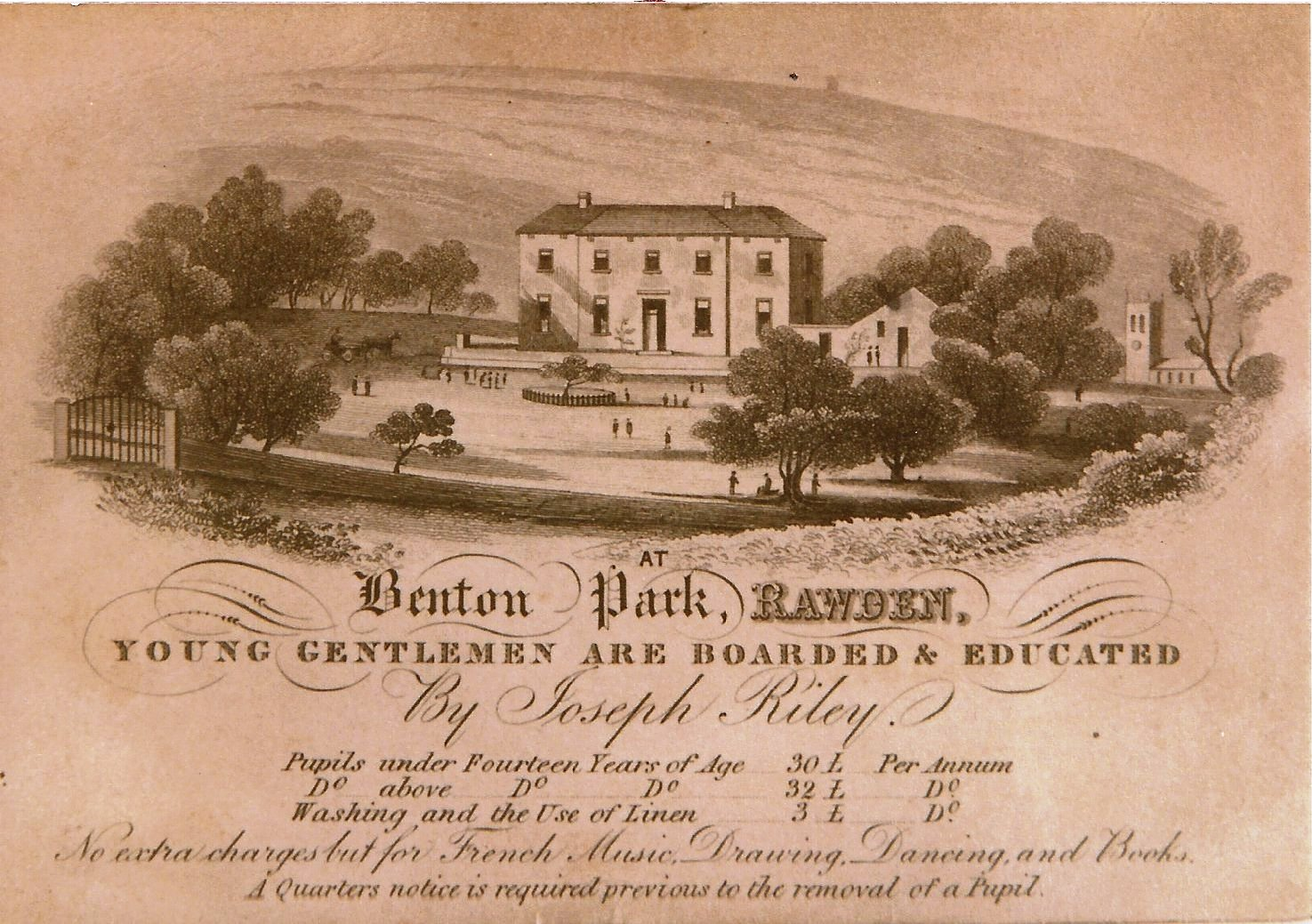
Advertisement for Benton Park School with a line drawing of the building.

Benton Park school was built in the grounds of old Benton Park house. The school was established by Joseph Riley in 1838 and by 1851 he had 33 boys in residence. His son John was also a teacher there. In the 1860s it was bought by the Milligan family for use as a private home and was not used as an educational establishment until Littlemoor School utilized the premises as a senior department from 1951 until 1957 when the building was demolished.

The new school was built in contemporary brutalist style by Sir John Burnet, Tait and Partners in the late 1950s and early 1960s, being formally opened by Lord ST. Oswald on Saturday 11 March 1961. In 2015, the Yorkshire Evening Post published an investigation into the risks posed by asbestos in the structure of the main school building. Consequently, in February 2019, Leeds City Council approved a £20 million project to rebuild the school, citing the poor condition of some of the school buildings. Building for the project began in June 2020. The new school building opened to students on 3 November 2021 and demolition of the old building began in March 2022.

== Notable alumni ==
- Anna Blyth, member of Great Britain Cycling team and past British Track Champion.
- Elizabeth Keates, actress.
- David Miliband, former UK Foreign Secretary and MP for South Shields.
- Billy Pearce, comedian (Known then as Stephen Cookson).
- Oliver Wainwright, architecture and design critic for The Guardian.
- Joe Tasker, YouTuber and CBBC presenter.
- George Webster, Cbeebies presenter and Down syndrome activist.
- Ranjodh Bains, award-winning software developer recognised by the UK Government's Department for Education.
- Adam Reed, entrepreneur and philanthropist recognised in Forbes magazine's 30 under 30.
