= Arts Educational Schools =

Coordinates: 51°29′46″N 0°15′09″W

Arts Educational Schools, London
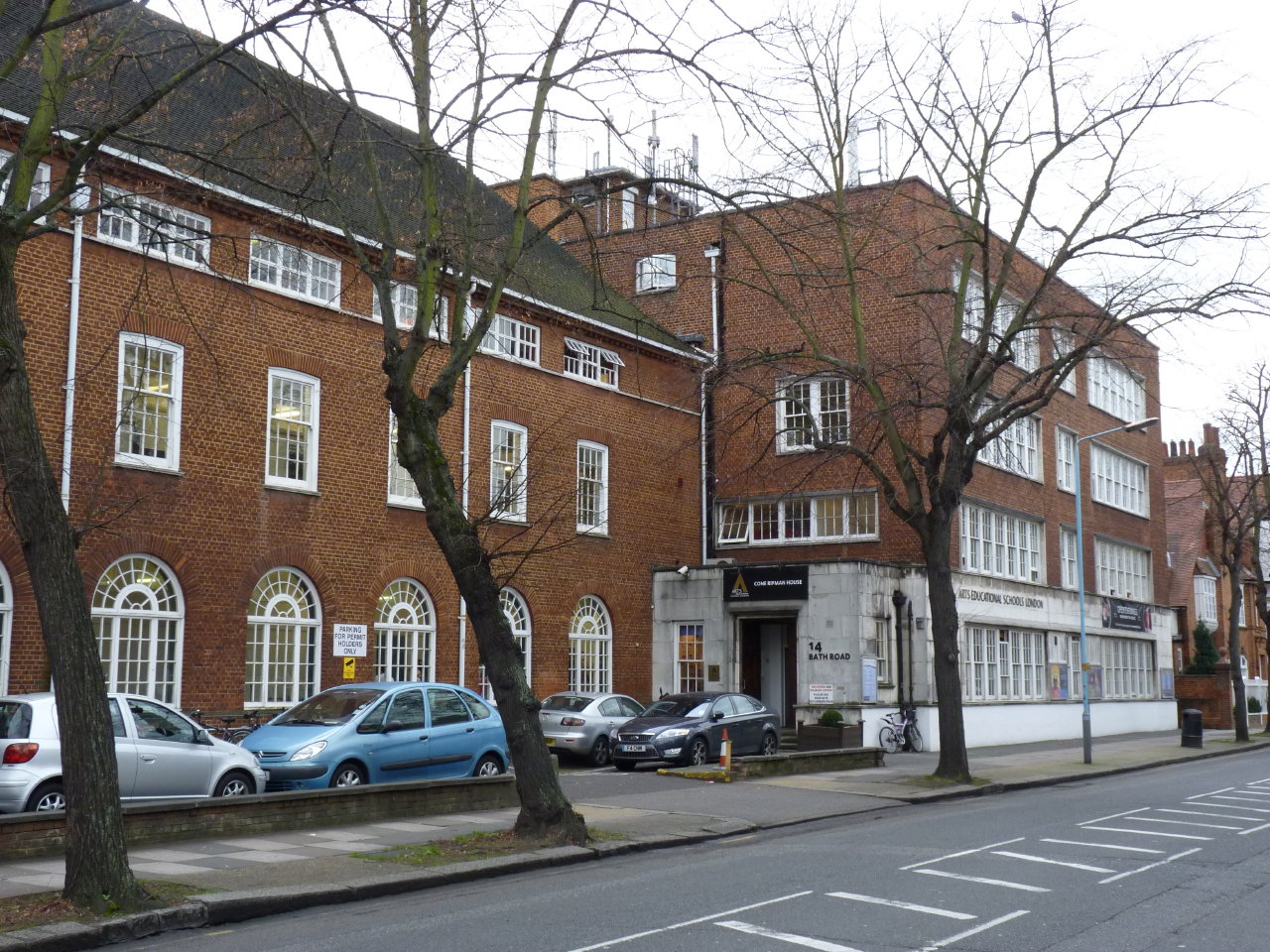
- The school, from Bath Road, Chiswick

Location
- Cone Ripman House; 14 Bath Road; Turnham Green Park; Chiswick, London, W4 1LY; England

Information
- Type: Private
- Established: 1939; 87 years ago
- Founder: Grace Cone and Olive Ripman
- Local authority: Hounslow
- Specialist: Performing arts
- Department for Education URN: 102551 Tables
- Ofsted: Reports
- President: Andrew Lloyd Webber
- Principal: Louise Jackson
- Gender: Coeducational
- Age: 11+
- Website: artsed.co.uk

Arts Educational Schools, or ArtsEd, is a drama school, and an independent performing arts secondary school in Chiswick, West London, England.

== Overview ==
ArtsEd provides specialist vocational training at secondary, further and higher education level in musical theatre and acting for film and television. The school also offers part-time and holiday courses in the performing arts.

ArtsEd is one of twenty-one specialist performing arts schools approved to offer government-funded Dance and Drama Awards, a scheme established to subsidise the cost of professional dance and drama training for the most talented students at leading institutions. It is a member of the Federation of Drama Schools.

== History ==
=== Chiswick School of Art ===
The arts and crafts architect Maurice Bingham Adams designed the Chiswick School of Art as part of the Bedford Park Garden Suburb's community focus on the site on Bath Road in 1881. The school was meant to provide the estate with a feeling of community. It taught classes such as "Freehand drawing in all its branches, practical Geometry and perspective, pottery and tile painting, design for decorative purposes – as in Wall-papers, Furniture, Metalwork, Stained Glass". The school was depicted by Thomas Erat Harrison in an 1882 book Bedford Park, celebrating the then-fashionable garden suburb. The Chiswick School of Art building was destroyed by a V-1 flying bomb in 1944.

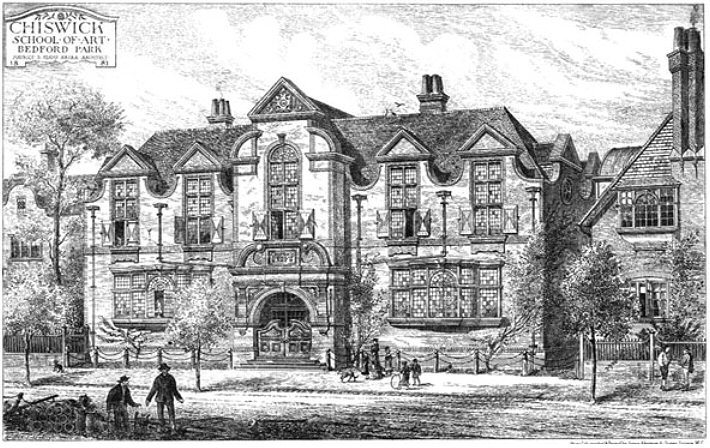
Design for Chiswick School of Art by Maurice Bingham Adams, 1881

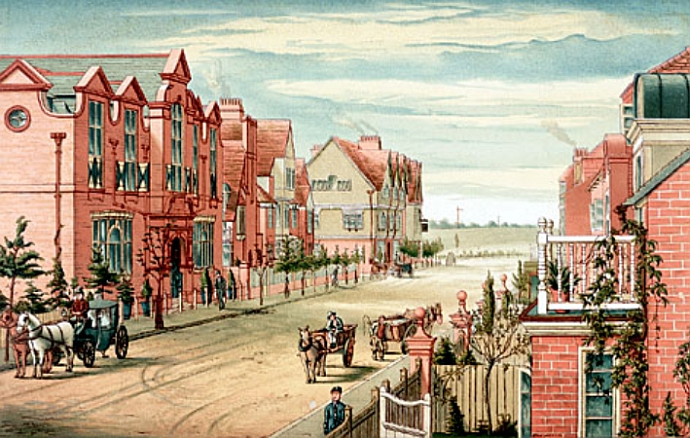
School of Art, Stores and Tabard Inn by Thomas Erat Harrison, 1882

=== Cone-Ripman School ===
ArtsEd was founded in 1939. It was formed as a result of a merger between the Cone School of Dancing founded in 1919 by Grace Cone, and the Ripman School founded in 1922 by Olive Ripman. Both Cone and Ripman offered curricula combining a general academic education with training in the arts, in preparation for professional careers connected with the theatre. The two schools were amalgamated in 1939 to form the Cone-Ripman School, the predecessor of today's ArtsEd.

The school was first based at Stratford Place, off Oxford Street in London. Teaching was disrupted by the outbreak of the Second World War, but in 1941, the school reopened at Stratford Place, while a second school operated at Tring Park. In 1945, the Cone-Ripman School obtained the lease to Tring Park; later, it purchased the building.

=== Two Arts Educational Schools ===
In 1947, both schools were renamed the Arts Educational Schools. The London school was for a while, until 1962, based at Hyde Park Corner (144 Piccadilly). The school then moved repeatedly to other buildings in Kensington. In 1969, the school acquired a lease for 21 years on Golden Lane House in the Barbican area of London. In 1986 the school purchased the former buildings of Chiswick Polytechnic.

=== One Arts Educational Schools, Chiswick ===
In the 2000s, the two schools became independent of each other, and the Tring school was renamed Tring Park School for the Performing Arts.

For many years, the president of the school was prima ballerina assoluta Dame Alicia Markova; Dame Beryl Grey became Director in the 1960s. Dame Alicia was succeeded in 2007 by Andrew Lloyd Webber.

Iain Reid was dean of the schools from 1999 until his retirement in December 2006. He was succeeded by John Baraldi, former chief executive of Riverside Studios, and former director of the East 15 Acting School; Baraldi left the school in 2009, and was succeeded by Jane Harrison. In 2017, Chris Hocking assumed the role of principal; he resigned in 2021 and was succeeded by Julie Spencer as interim principal.

In 2013, ArtsEd was awarded a grant by the Andrew Lloyd Webber Foundation to fund a refurbishment project. The money was spent on the main theatre, costume storage, the School of Film and Television and the school's access facilities.

== Academics ==
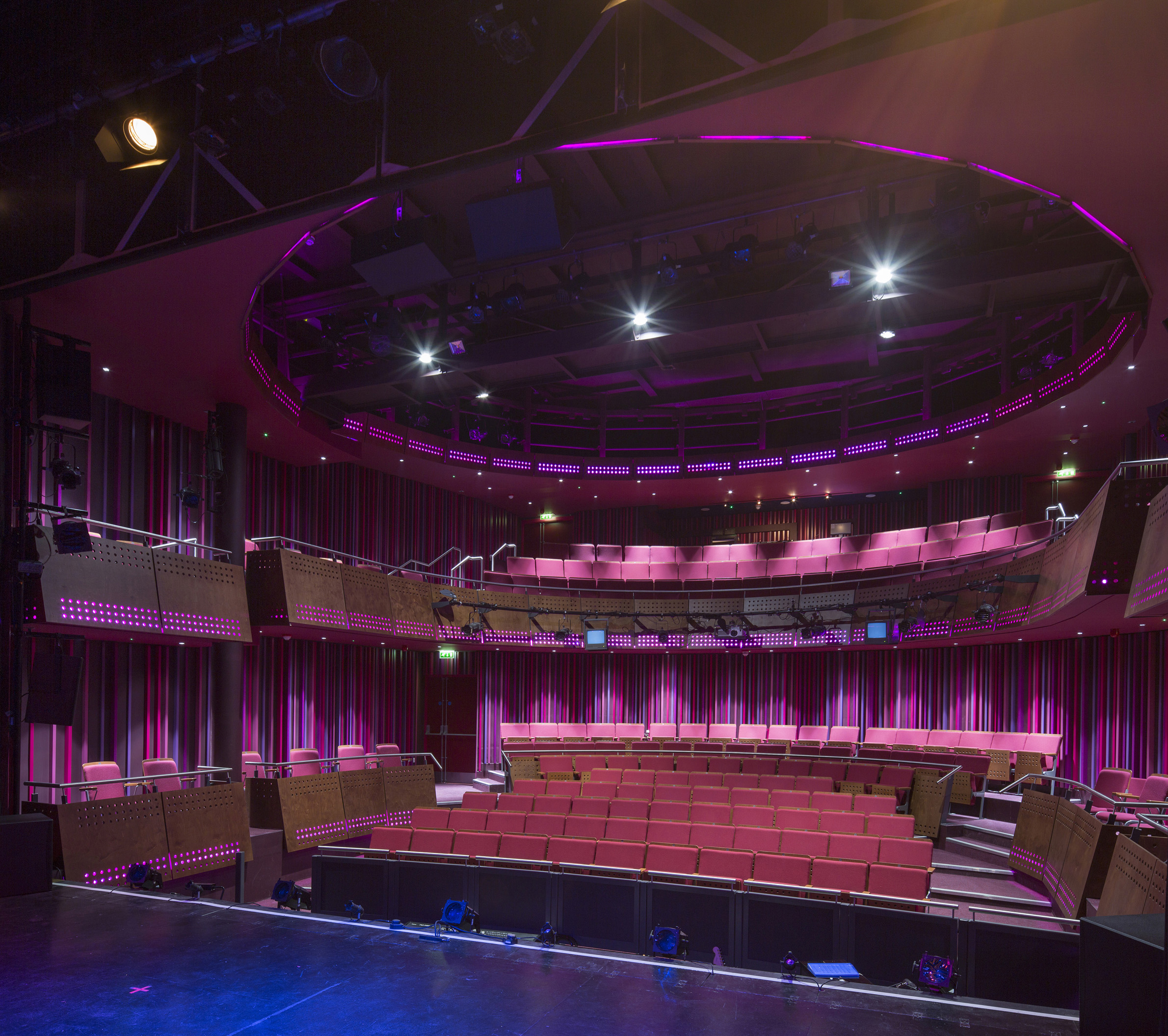
The school's Andrew Lloyd Webber Foundation Theatre, 2013

=== Day School and Sixth Form ===
The Day School and Sixth Form cater to students aged 11 to 18. Students are required to study mainstream subjects, in preparation for the GCSE and A-Levels, alongside their performing arts pursuits. Besides the A-Levels pathway, Sixth Form students have an option to complete a BTEC Extended Diploma in a performing arts discipline.

In 2015, the school was rated "Outstanding" by Ofsted. In 2019 it ranked second in the borough for percentage of pupils passing five or more GCSEs at A*-C.

=== Tertiary ===
The school had been accredited by Drama UK (organisation dissolved in 2016). It offers Quality Assurance Agency for Higher Education recognised qualifications validated by the City University London or Trinity College, London. A non-degree foundation course is offered for students who do not meet the audition and/or academic requirements for admission into the bachelor's degree programmes.

== Safeguarding and bullying concerns ==
In 2012, there were concerns about bullying at the school. In 2021, a report was published on safeguarding issues at the school. It found that "there was an overly sexualised environment within a number of music and dance classes" and that some staff had had inappropriate relationships with students. The principal, Chris Hocking, resigned following the report. There were further allegations of bullying by staff and a toxic culture in 2023. After an investigation, both the headteacher of the day school and the principal, Julie Spencer, left in 2024. In 2025, the school attributed its £500,000 deficit mainly to the cost of the bullying investigation.

== Former pupils ==
- Moyo Akandé
- Kai Alexander
- Julie Andrews
- Simone Ashley
- Samantha Barks
- Darcey Bussell
- Gary Carr
- Adam Cooper
- Martin Clunes
- Omari Douglas
- Tom Francis
- Laura Haddock
- Nigel Harman
- Nigel Havers
- Bonnie Langford
- Margaret Lockwood
- Alexandros Logothetis
- Lashana Lynch
- Madeleine Mantock
- Megan McKenna
- Tuppence Middleton
- Tendai Rinomhota
- Hugo Speer
- Michaela Strachan
- Oliver Tompsett
- Sally Anne Triplett
- Will Young
- 'Yungblud' (Dominic Richard Harrison)
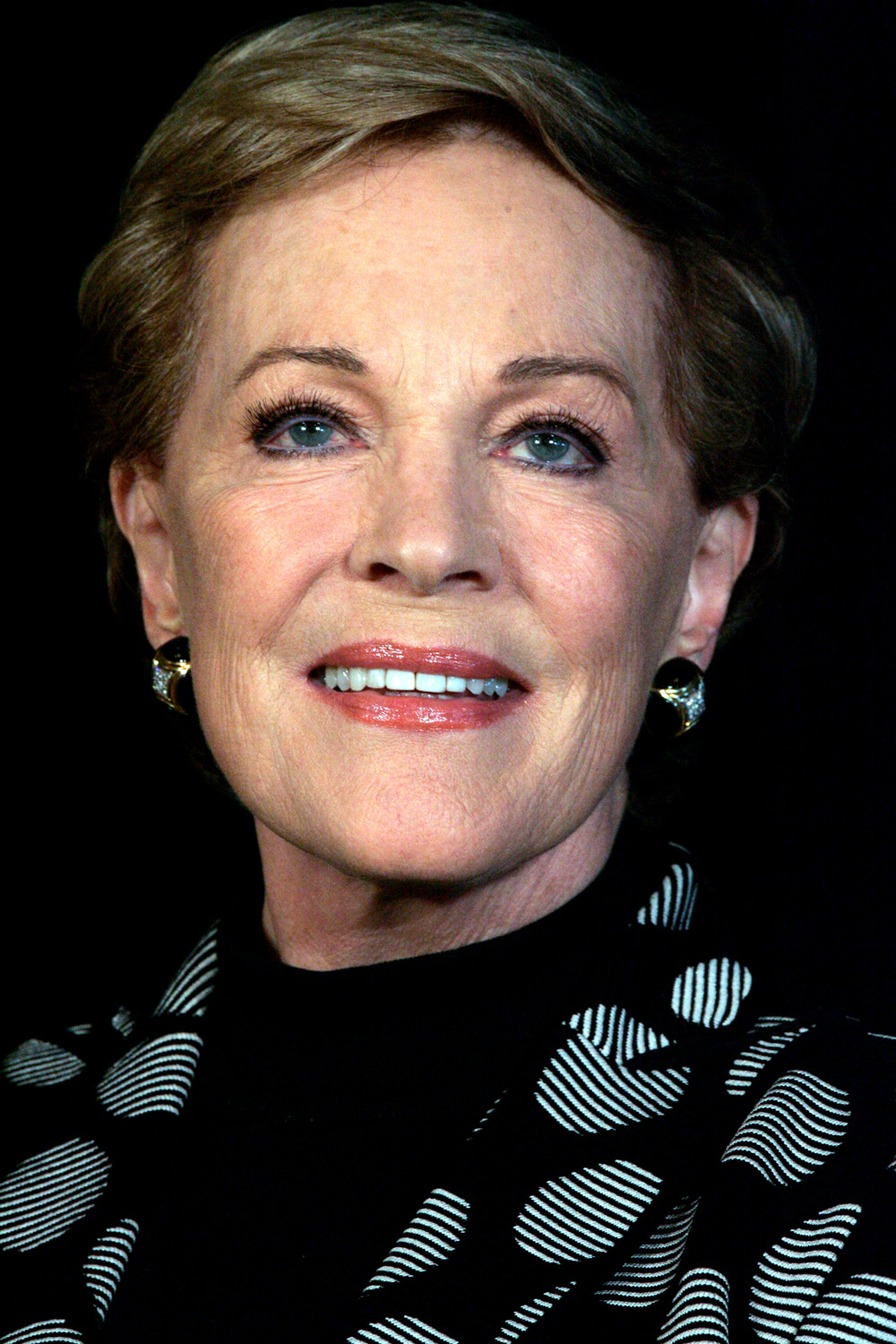
Julie Andrews

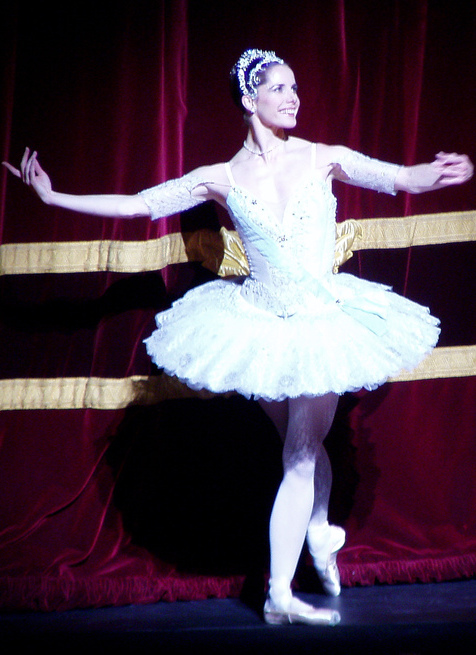
Darcey Bussell

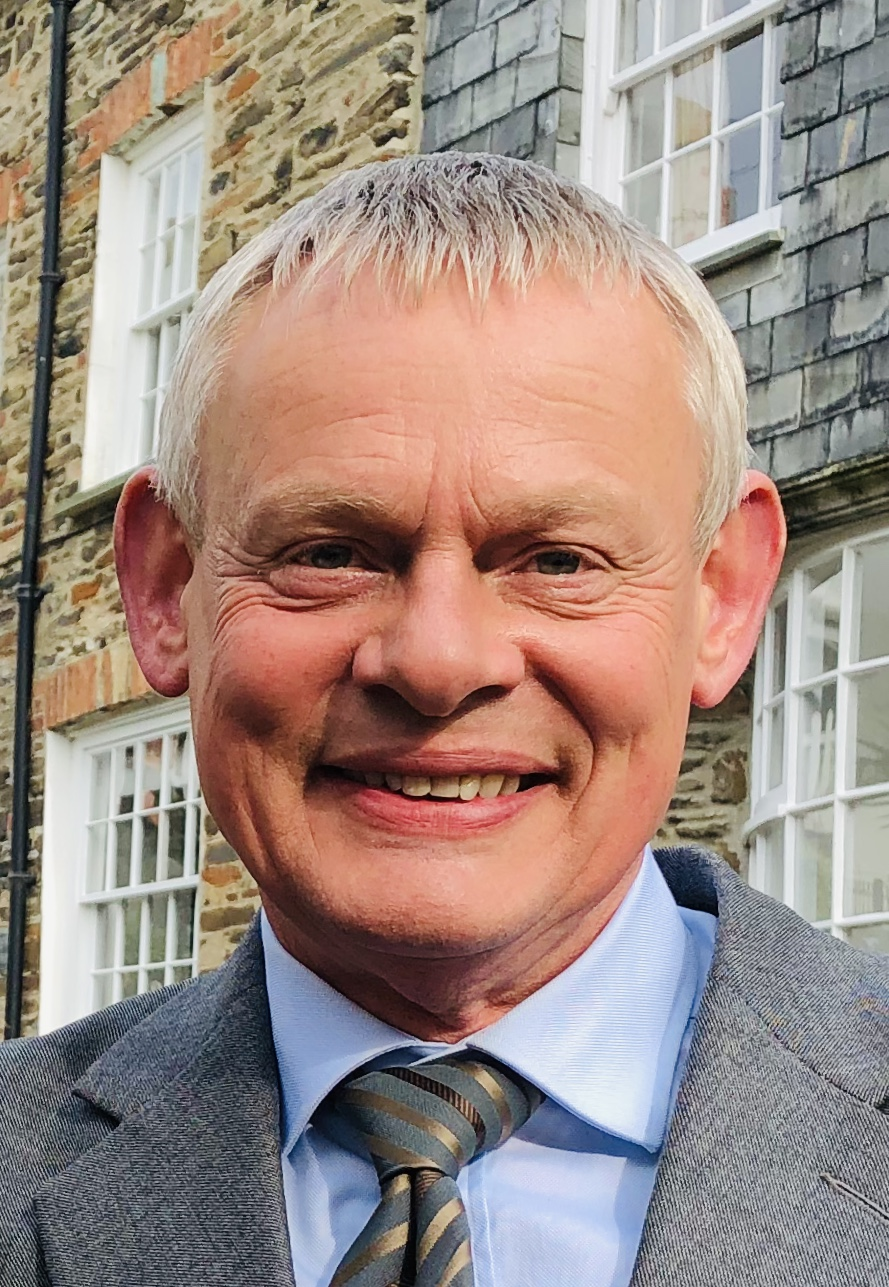
Martin Clunes

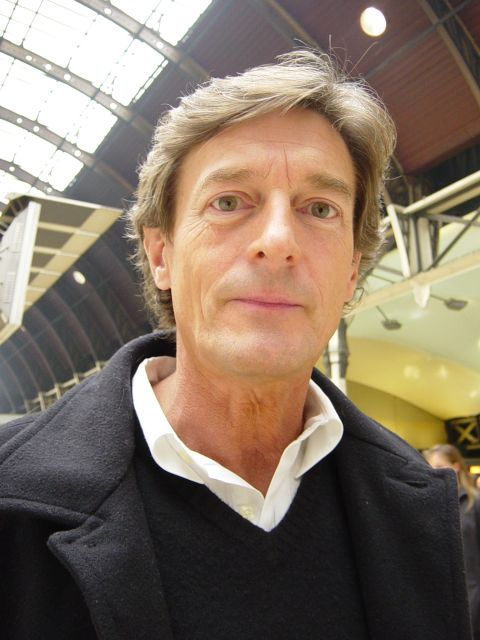
Nigel Havers

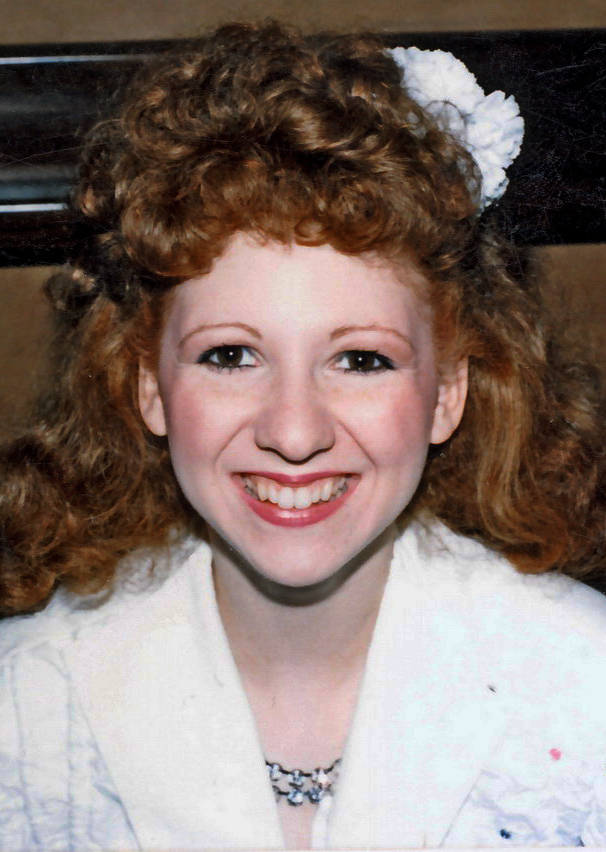
Bonnie Langford

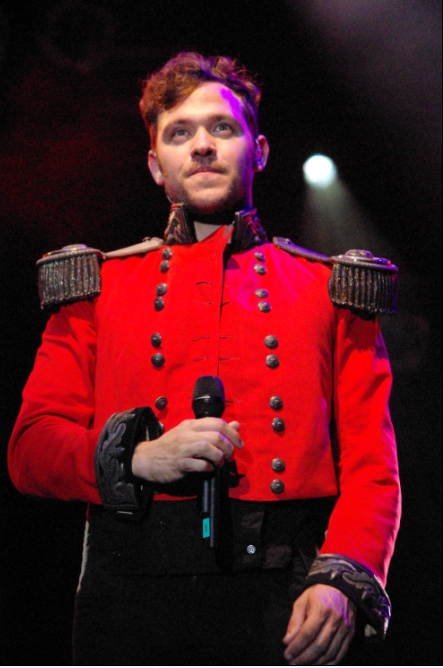
Will Young

== See also ==
- List of schools in Hounslow
