= Damian Cruden =

Damian Cruden was the former artistic director of York Theatre Royal and artistic director designate of the now failed Shakespeare's Rose Theatres. He is currently Artistic Director of Alnwick Playhouse.

== Career ==
Cruden trained at the Royal Scottish Academy of Music and Drama in Glasgow, 1982–1986. He then worked for the Tron Theatre and the TAG Theatre Company, and was tutor for the Scottish Youth Theatre. Moving to England, he became co-artistic director for the Liverpool Everyman Youth Theatre, then associate director for Hull Truck in the early 1990s. He was artistic director at York Theatre Royal between 1997 and 2019. His departure from York Theatre Royal was announced on 22 February 2019 simultaneous to the announcement that he would take the role of artistic director of Shakespeare's Rose pop-up theatres in York and Blenheim Palace.

== Notable productions ==
Amongst the dozens of his productions in York are the following:

- Pygmalion, with Sarah Quintrell, June 2006
- The Railway Children, stage adaptation written by Mike Kenny featuring a real steam locomotive and staged in 2008 and 2009 at the National Railway Museum in York. Subsequently restaged at the Waterloo International railway station. and at John Street Roundhouse in Toronto. The production at Waterloo won the 2011 Laurence Olivier Award for Best Entertainment.
- The White Crow, by Donald Freed, May 2009
- To Kill a Mockingbird, adapted by Christopher Sergel, February 2011, starring Duncan Preston
- My Family and Other Animals, adapted by Janys Chambers, June 2011
- Forty Years On, September 2011
