= Mike Kenny (writer) =

British playwright

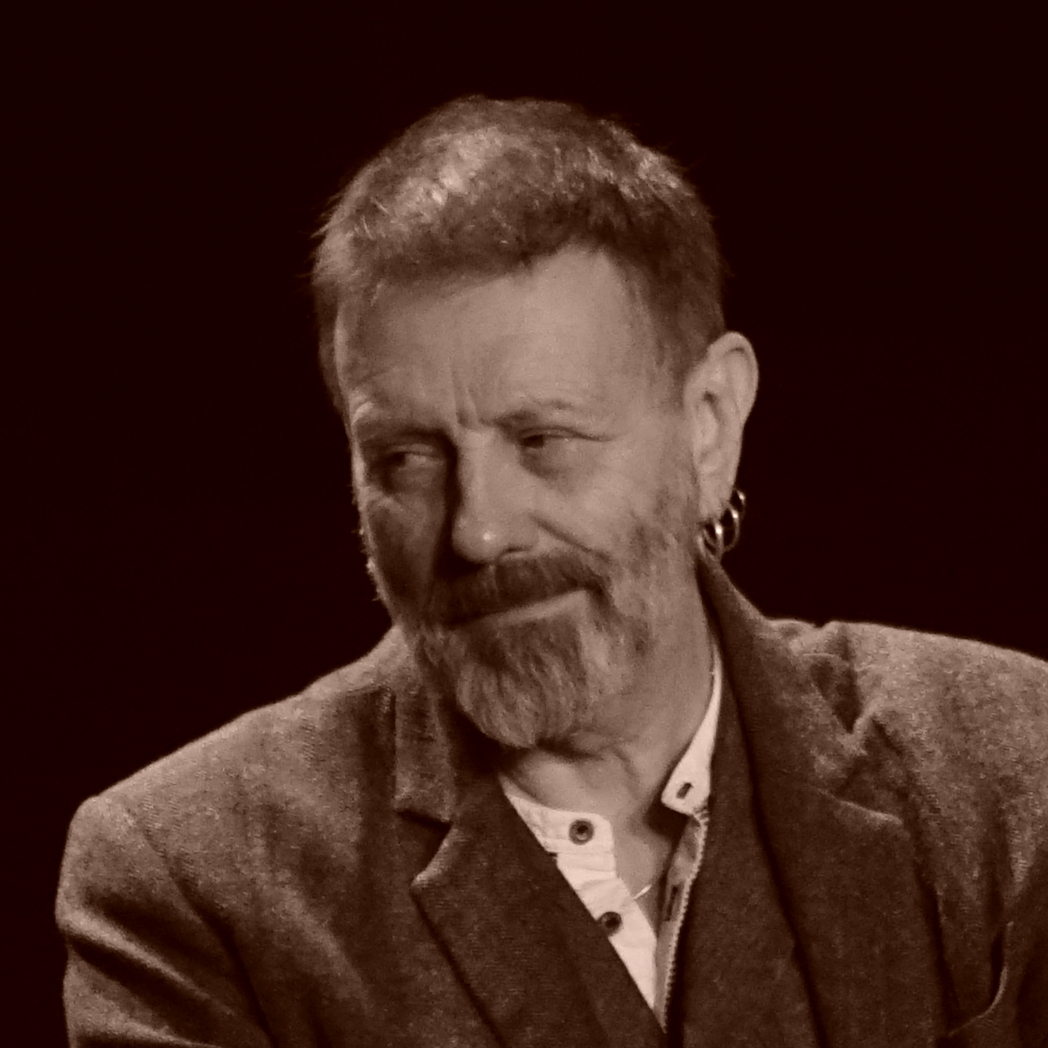
2017

Mike Kenny (born in the Welsh borders, with a Welsh mother) is one of England's leading writers specialising in young people's theatre. He was included in the Independent on Sunday’s list of Top Ten Living Playwrights and his plays are performed regularly throughout the UK and all over the world. In 2000, he was Arts Council England’s first recipient of The Children's Award for Playwriting for Children and Young People.

His Olivier Award-winning adaptation of The Railway Children for York Theatre Royal, has had several successful revivals at Waterloo and Kings Cross stations, as well as at the National Railway Museum. The first production, directed by Damian Cruden, starred Sarah Quintrell, Colin Tarrant, Marshall Lancaster, Elizabeth Keates, Marcus Brigstocke and featured a working Stirling Single (GNR 4-2-2 No.1) steam locomotive on a real rail track. In Canada, it won the People's Choice Award following its record-breaking run in Toronto. Kenny also won the 2015 Writers Guild Award for Best Play for Younger Audiences with Three Wise Monkeys and the Deutscher Kindertheaterpreis in 2012 with Electric Darkness. In July 2013, Mike was awarded an honorary Doctor of Letters by the University of Nottingham for his work in theatre for young people.

He is married to actress Barbara Marten, they have three sons, Theo, Josh and Billy. She met him in the 1980s, while acting in a student pantomime in Birmingham, when they were studying to become a teachers.

His play Fittings: The Last Freakshow was published in Graeae Plays 1: New Plays Redefining Disability (2002, Aurora Metro Books)
