= Stephanie Chambers =

British actress (born 1971)

- Born: 9 March 1971 (age 55); Birmingham, Warwickshire, England
- Occupation: Actress
- Spouse: Steven Pinder
- Children: 1

Stephanie Chambers (born 9 March 1971) is an English actress, born in Birmingham, Warwickshire. She is known for playing Gabby Parr in the British soap Brookside, but has also appeared in New Tricks, Doctors, Emmerdale and the American horror film Seed of Chucky. Chambers trained at the Academy of Live and Recorded Arts in London.

She is married to Brookside co-star Steven Pinder and they have a daughter Scarlett Rose.
