= Deutscher Jugendtheaterpreis =

German literary award

Der Deutsche Jugendtheaterpreis and der Deutsche Kindertheaterpreis are literary theater prizes of Germany, Jugend for Youth and Kinder for Children.

- 1996
  - Kindertheaterpreis
    - Rudolf Herfurtner, Waldkinder
    - Special Mention ('Lobende Erwähnung') Guy Krneta, Ursel
  - Jugendtheaterpreis
    - Oliver Bukowski, Ob so oder so
    - Special Mention Ljudmila Rasumowskaja, Nach Hause
- 1998
  - Kindertheaterpreis
    - Ad de Bont, Die Tochter des Ganovenkönigs and Barbara Buri for the translation
  - Jugendtheaterpreis
    - Lutz Hübner, Das Herz eines Boxers
- 2000
  - Kindertheaterpreis
    - Jonna Nordenskiöld, Jonna Ponna! (from Swedish by Verena Reichel)
  - Jugendtheaterpreis
    - Thomas Oberender, Nachtschwärmer
    - Special Mention Lisa Rose-Cameron, no stairway to heaven
- 2002
  - Kindertheaterpreis
    - Kerstin Specht, Wieland
  - Jugendtheaterpreis
    - Kai Hensel, Klamms Krieg
- 2004
  - Kindertheaterpreis
    - Heleen Verburg, Katharina Katharina im Gänsespiel
  - Jugendtheaterpreis
    - Andri Beyeler, The killer in me is the killer in you my love
- 2006
  - Kindertheaterpreis
    - Ulrich Hub, An der Arche um acht
  - Jugendtheaterpreis
    - Jan Liedtke, Kamikaze Pictures
- 2008
  - Kindertheaterpreis
    - Katrin Lange, Unter hohem Himmel: Parzival
  - Jugendtheaterpreis
    - Daniel Danis, Kiwi and Tina Müller Bikini (Prize divided)
- 2010
  - Kindertheaterpreis
    - Charles Way, Verschwunden
  - Jugendtheaterpreis
    - Martin Baltscheit, Die besseren Wälder
- 2012
  - Kindertheaterpreis
    - Mike Kenny, Nachtgeknister (Electric Darkness)
  - Jugendtheaterpreis
    - Björn Bicker, Deportation Cast
- 2014
  - Kindertheaterpreis
    - Jens Raschke, Was das Nashorn sah, als es auf die andere Seite des Zauns schaute
  - Jugendtheaterpreis
    - David Greig, Monster (The Monster in the Hall)and Barbara Christ for the translation from English
- 2016
  - Kindertheaterpreis
    - Martin Baltscheit, Krähe und Bär oder: Die Sonne scheint für uns alle
  - Jugendtheaterpreis
    - Jörg Menke-Peitzmeyer, The Working Dead. Ein hartes Stück Arbeit
- 2018
  - Kindertheaterpreis
    - Fabrice Melquiot, Die Zertrennlichen, translated by Leyla-Claire Rabih, Frank Weigand
  - Jugendtheaterpreis
    - Dino Pešut, Der (vorletzte) Panda oder Die Statik, translated by Alida Bremer supported by Sonja Anders and Friederike Heller
- 2020
  - Kindertheaterpreis
    - Theo Fransz, Liebe Grüße oder Wohin das Leben fällt
  - Jugendtheaterpreis
    - Rabiah Hussain, Absprung (Orig. Spun)
