= Masters Performing Arts College =

Performers College Rayleigh

Location
- Arterial Road; Rayleigh, Essex, SS6 7UQ; United Kingdom; 53.795330°N 1.387760°W

Information
- Type: Independent FE College
- Established: 1995
- Specialist: Performing Arts
- Gender: Co-educational
- Age: 16+
- Website: http://www.mastersperformingarts.co.uk

Performers College is an independent, co-educational college specialising in performing arts. It is based across four sites in Birmingham, Brighton, Essex and Manchester.

== Overview ==
The college offers training in key areas including ballet, tap dance, jazz, contemporary dance, singing, and drama, and provides a Professional 3-Year Diploma in Musical Theatre/Dance, accredited by the Council for Dance Education and Training. Scholarships and funding awards are available to students.
