= Bristol Old Vic Theatre School =

Drama school in Bristol, England

Coordinates: 51.467°N 2.620°W

- Type: Drama school
- Established: 1946; 80 years ago
- Affiliations: Federation of Drama Schools; University of the West of England, Bristol; Conservatoire for Dance and Drama
- Principal: Stuart Harvey
- Artistic Director: Emma Callander
- Location: Bristol, England
- Website: oldvic.ac.uk

Bristol Old Vic Theatre School within Bristol

The Bristol Old Vic Theatre School (BOVTS) is a drama school in Bristol, England. The institution provides training in acting and production for careers in film, television and theatre.

BOVTS was an affiliate of the Conservatoire for Dance and Drama until the conservatoire was disbanded in 2021. Its higher education awards are currently validated by the University of the West of England, and its students graduate alongside members of UWE Bristol's Faculty of Arts, Creative Industries and Education. It is a member of the Federation of Drama Schools.

== History ==
The School opened in October 1946, eight months after the founding of its parent Bristol Old Vic Theatre Company, in a room above a fruit merchant's warehouse in the Rackhay near the stage door of the Theatre Royal, with support from Sir Laurence Olivier. (The yard of the derelict St Nicholas School, next to the warehouse, was still used by the Company for rehearsals of crowd scenes and stage fights as late as the early 1960s, such as for John Hale's productions of Romeo and Juliet starring the Canadian actor Paul Massie and Annette Crosbie, a former student of the School, and Rostand's Cyrano de Bergerac with Peter Wyngarde. Students from the Theatre School frequently played in these crowd scenes and fights.)

The School continued in these premises for eight years because of the Old Vic's lack of funds in the post-war decade until 1954 when the Company produced a small-scale end-of season topical musical for the entertainment of regular patrons and to allow the actors to 'let their hair down' after a season of mainly serious productions.

This musical, Salad Days by Julian Slade and Dorothy Reynolds, proved very popular with Bristol audiences and was subsequently transferred to London's West End where it was an instant hit and played for more than four years, making it the longest running production in West End history at the time. £7,000 from the Salad Days profits – a large sum in those days— was given to the School towards the purchase and conversion of two large adjoining Victorian villas at 1 and 2 Downside Road in Clifton. In 1995, the enduring benefit to students of that donation was formally recognised when a new custom-built dance and movement studio in the School's back garden was named the Slade/Reynolds Studio.

Many members of the theatrical profession have taught at the Bristol Old Vic Theatre School. This included Rudi Shelly,who joined the teaching staff only two weeks after the School opened in 1946 and was still working into his nineties. Alumni from around the world gathered in Bristol for his funeral at which the eulogy was delivered by alumna Stephanie Cole. Apart from students of the School, over the years many established actors from around the world sought out Rudi Shelly's master classes when visiting or working in England.

At the time of the School's move to its current premises in Downside Road, Clifton, in 1956, the Principal was Duncan (Bill) Ross,who had succeeded the first Principal, Edward Stanley in 1954. After guiding the School through seven difficult years that are nonetheless still regarded by his former students as a golden age, Ross left in late 1961 to take up a teaching post in the USA. Soon after the departure of this much-loved principal, other key staff members resigned, including Daphne Heard and Maggie Collins, and Paula Gwyn-Davies, the School Secretary.

After a short interregnum under the actor Richard Ainley, in 1963 the post of Principal was taken by Nat Brenner, a distinguished actor and theatre technician and, at that time, general manager of the Bristol Old Vic Theatre. Brenner's stewardship was regarded by students of the time as another golden age. He remained in the post until 1980, when he was succeeded by Christopher Denys, who retired in the summer of 2007 to be replaced by Paul Rummer as Principal and Sue Wilson in the new post of Artistic Director. Paul Rummer retired in 2020 and was succeeded by Fiona Francombe, previously the director of Bristol's Bottle Yard Studios. Until 1989 the Theatre School was part of the Bristol Old Vic Company, but it is now a financially independent organisation.

On 6 January 2025, the school announced it would no longer be accepting applications for undergraduate degree programmes, and not admitting any new undergraduate students from September 2025. The school will "continue delivering our distinct suite of intensive postgraduate courses and exciting, accessible short courses", blaming the change on financial issues caused by increasing costs and decreasing income as faced by other institutions.

== Courses ==
Generally the theatre school accepted 28 people out of approximately 2,500 applications per year for the three-year BA acting course, making it one of the most selective drama schools in the world. Applicants were judged purely on talent in two rounds of intensive auditions. It has its own premises in Clifton, bought with proceeds from the London success of Salad Days. It previously had working links with the Drama Department of the University of Bristol, which still holds many papers of the Theatre School in its Theatre Collection. For many years it presented regular student productions in the Department's experimental Drama Studio converted from an indoor tennis court off a corridor in the Wills Memorial Building behind the University's Bell Tower at the top of Bristol's fashionable Park Street. Students from the School and the Drama Department shared many of each other's formal lectures and a number of the Department's graduates went on to continue their studies as full-time students at the School.

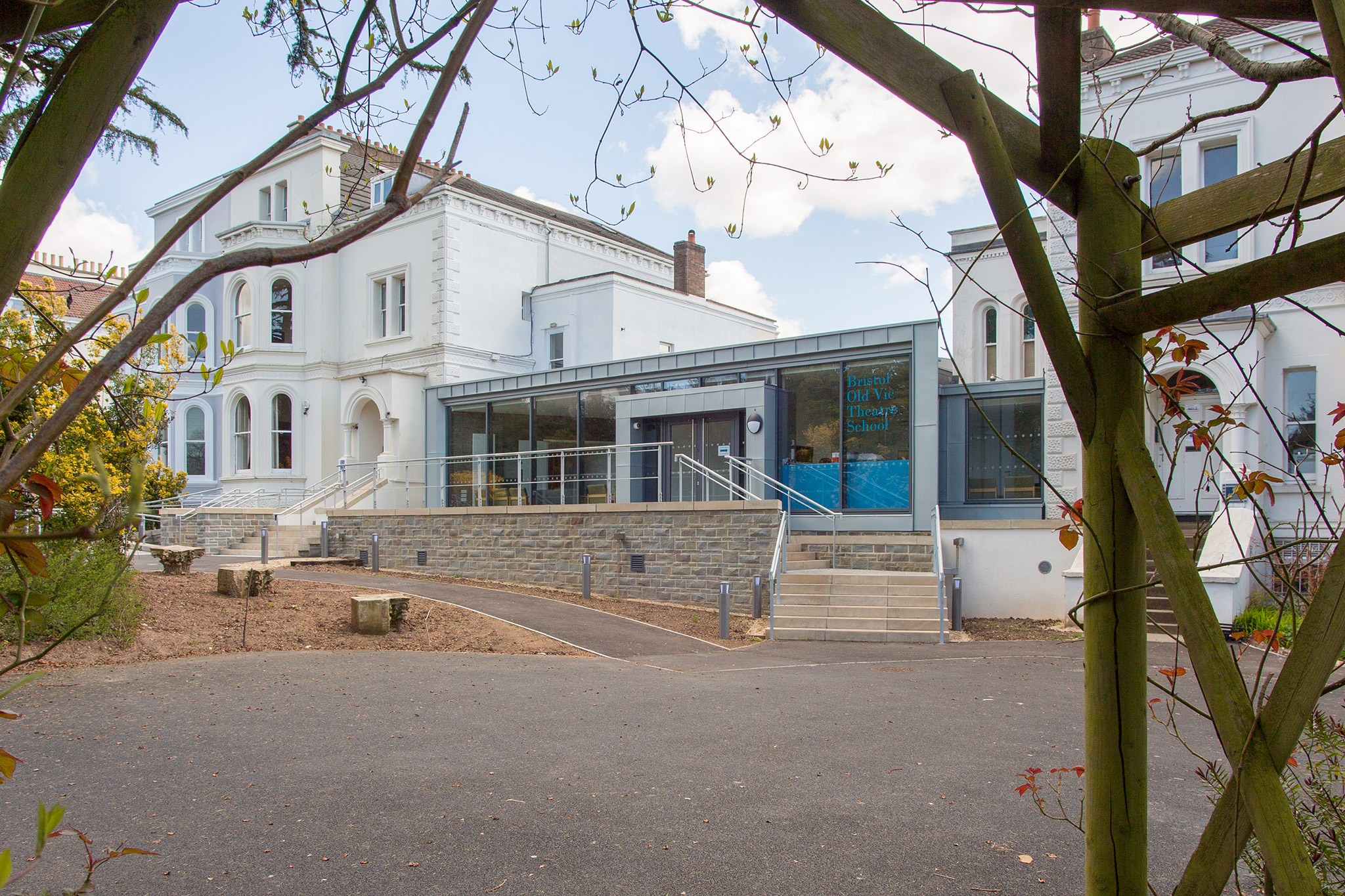
Bristol Old Vic Theatre School

Having struggled with limited resources until the 1960s, the School now has access to several local performance venues, including the Redgrave Theatre at Clifton College (named after the actor Sir Michael Redgrave, an old boy of the College) the Bristol Old Vic theatre complex, including the Theatre Royal, Weston Studio and Circomedia in Portland Square. It also takes productions on tour to locations in the West Country, a tradition dating back to the 1950s when for several years students moved to Dartington Hall in South Devon for two weeks each spring where they rehearsed and presented a public production in the Barn Theatre. The School was able to use broadcasting studio facilities at the University Drama Studio for radio drama training in the 1950s and also ran occasional courses in conjunction with the BBC at their Bristol Studios in Whiteladies Road. In 2002, the Theatre School bought the former BBC Christchurch radio studios in Clifton and has further developed the facilities there which include sound studios and sound and video editing suites which are used by students and also by music and media industry clients. The school has scenic workshops in Bedminster used by the technical courses.

As well as actors, the Bristol Old Vic Theatre School also provides comprehensive training courses for all theatre, radio, film, and television professionals.

Its graduates are to be found in key positions as actors, directors, writers, set designers, costume designers, lighting designers and stage and company managers throughout the world.

In January 2025 the School announced that it was closing applications to its undergraduate degrees to new students that would have started their studies in September 2025. The School continued to accept applications for postgraduate courses and will remain teaching all current students until the end of their studies. The School is working on a new plan to launch additional full-time training from Sept 2026, but needs to create a more financially robust model of income to secure its future.

== Notable alumni ==
- Christopher Biggins – (Porridge)
- Brian Blessed – (Flash Gordon, Star Wars: Episode I – The Phantom Menace)
- Samantha Bond – (James Bond, Downton Abbey)
- Laura Carmichael – (Downton Abbey, The Spanish Princess)
- Flaminia Cinque – (Doctors, EastEnders)
- Olivia Colman – (The Favourite, The Crown)
- Charlie Cox – (Daredevil, The Theory of Everything)
- Richard Coyle – (A Good Year, Chilling Adventures of Sabrina)
- Annette Crosbie – (One Foot in the Grave, The Six Wives of Henry VIII, Edward the Seventh)
- Daniel Day-Lewis – (There Will Be Blood, Lincoln, Phantom Thread)
- Jeffrey DeMunn – (The Green Mile, The Walking Dead)
- Stephen Dillane – (Game of Thrones, King Arthur)
- Erin Doherty – (The Crown, Adolescence)
- Phil Dunster – (Ted Lasso)
- Nicholas Farrell – (Chariots of Fire, Pearl Harbor, The Iron Lady)
- Oded Fehr – (The Mummy)
- Matt Frewer – (Honey, I Shrunk the Kids, Dawn of the Dead)
- Billy Harris – (Ted Lasso)
- Naomie Harris – (28 Days Later, Pirates of the Caribbean, Skyfall)
- Billy Howle – (Glue)
- Daniel Ings – (Lovesick, The Gentlemen, A Knight of the Seven Kingdoms)
- Jeremy Irons – (The Lion King, Die Hard with a Vengeance, Kingdom of Heaven)
- Aled Jones – (Walking in the Air)
- Theo James – (Divergent, The White Lotus)
- Joan Knight – (artistic director of Perth Theatre)
- Marshall Lancaster – (Life on Mars, Ashes to Ashes)
- Phyllida Law – (The Time Machine, Kingdom)
- Jonathan Linsley – (Last of the Summer Wine, Pirates of the Caribbean)
- Joseph Mawle – (SoundProof, Game Of Thrones)
- Josh O'Connor – (Challengers, The Crown)
- Eva O'Hara – (Hollyoaks)
- David Oakes – (Victoria, The Borgias)
- Sean Pertwee – (Event Horizon, Gotham)
- Pete Postlethwaite – (In the Name of the Father, Inception)
- Pearl Mackie – (Doctor Who)
- Faye Marsay – (Game of Thrones, Love, Nina)
- Rupert Penry-Jones – (Spooks, Silk)
- Tim Pigott-Smith – (V for Vendetta, Clash of the Titans)
- Miranda Richardson – (Sleepy Hollow, Fred Claus)
- Azela Robinson – (Cañaveral de pasiones, Yo no creo en los hombres)
- Anna Rust – (Carnival Row)
- Matt Ryan – (Constantine, Legends of Tomorrow)
- Greta Scacchi – (White Mischief, Presumed Innocent)
- Adrian Scarborough – (Gavin & Stacey, Upstairs Downstairs)
- Ray Stevenson – (Rome, Black Sails, Ahsoka)
- Patrick Stewart – (Star Trek: The Next Generation, X-Men)
- Mark Strong – (Kingsman: The Secret Service, The Imitation Game, 1917)
- Trudie Styler – (The Mayor of Casterbridge, The American Bride)
- Charlie Suff – (EastEnders)
- Antonia Thomas – (Misfits, The Good Doctor)
- Sophie Thompson – (Harry Potter and the Deathly Hallows – Part 1, EastEnders)
- Gene Wilder – (Willy Wonka & the Chocolate Factory, Young Frankenstein)
- Olivia Williams – (The Sixth Sense, Victoria & Abdul)
- Tom Williamson – (The Fosters)
- Niall Wright – (Dani's Castle)

== See also ==
- Culture in Bristol
