= Manchester School of Theatre =

Drama school in England

Location
- Arts and Humanities Building, Manchester Metropolitan University, Cavendish St, Manchester M15 6BG; Manchester, Greater Manchester, M15 6BG; England; 53.470°N 2.237°W

Information
- Type: Drama school
- Established: 1970
- Founder: Manchester College of Art and Design and Manchester Polytechnic
- Affiliations: Federation of Drama Schools
- Validating University: Manchester Metropolitan University
- Website: Official website

The Manchester School of Theatre (originally the Manchester Polytechnic School of Theatre) is a tertiary school of theatre, drama and performance situated in the city of Manchester, founded in 1970. It is a part of Manchester Metropolitan University, and, in its work as a conservatoire, a member of the Federation of Drama Schools.

== History ==
Manchester Polytechnic School of Theatre evolved out of an early training course for drama teachers that was introduced by the Manchester College of Art and Design between 1964 and 1966. The theatre school was officially established in 1970 as part of Manchester Polytechnic under its charismatic Head of School Edward Argent and Senior Lecturer John Cargill Thompson. It was established to provide a professional training for actors that went beyond the rather staid traditions of the established drama schools: at the time, the Central School of Speech and Drama would examine prospective students' teeth, like a horse, to see if they had the teeth of a professional actor. Argent and his team believed that the authentic spirit of an actor, even if contained within a less-than-conventionally-perfect body, was more important.

Based initially at the former Congregational Church on Cavendish Street (now demolished) and the adjacent former Righton's Haberdashery (which survives), in 1971 the School of Theatre moved to the Capitol Theatre, Didsbury (also now demolished), a former cinema from where in the Sixties ABC Television's influential Armchair Theatre series had been broadcast. The School established an outstanding national and international reputation due largely to the authenticity and individuality of its alumni, actors such as George Costigan, Richard Griffiths, Bernard Hill and David Threlfall, as well as Dame Julie Walters - and from the postgraduate course run jointly with Manchester University, Sir Antony Sher. More recent students have included Amanda Burton, Steve Coogan, Jenny Eclair, John Hannah and John Thomson.

In 1992 Manchester Polytechnic changed its name to Manchester Metropolitan University and in 1998, the School relocated to the MMU All Saints campus in Chorlton on Medlock, Manchester, bringing it into closer contact with the city and Manchester School of Art, of which it is a part. The move increased access to central Manchester which served to further strengthen the school's links with many of the region's key employers – including the BBC, The Royal Exchange Theatre and Contact Theatre.

== Academic programmes ==
The School is part of the Department of Art and Performance at the Manchester School of Art at Manchester Metropolitan University. It runs two undergraduate programmes: a conservatoire-style BA Acting degree, and BA Drama and Contemporary Performance degree which combines critical and historical study with the creation of innovative performance in a studio setting. Both courses last three years. It also offers a multi-strand MA in Performance, including one strand with strong links to the laboratory theatre tradition of Odin Teatret. The conservatoire BA Acting trains students for work in stage, television and radio industries, and its graduates are eligible for Equity status.

In 2019, the School moved into a new purpose-built building on Manchester Metropolitan University's main campus in central Manchester known as Grosvenor East. This building maintains the facade of its predecessor, the Chorton-upon-Medlock Town Hall, which hosted the 5th Pan-African Congress in 1945. An installation pays tribute to this heritage.

== Partnerships ==
The School has partnerships with the Hallé Orchestra, RNCM, HOME and Chetham's School of Music.

== Notable alumni ==
Notable graduates from the school of theatre include:

- Zawe Ashton
- John Bradley-West
- Amelia Bullmore
- Amanda Burton
- Sue Cleaver
- Steve Coogan
- Jenny Eclair
- Burn Gorman
- Simon Greenall
- Richard Griffiths
- Graeme Hawley
- Paul Henshall
- Zoe Henry
- Bernard Hill
- Judy Holt
- Jeff Hordley
- Emma Kearney
- Matthew Kelly
- Kevin Kennedy
- Noreen Kershaw
- Elliot Knight
- Pippa Nixon
- Antony Sher
- Debra Stephenson
- John Thomson
- David Threlfall
- Annie Wallace
- Dame Julie Walters
- Assad Zaman
