= Yat Malmgren =

Swedish dancer and theatre pedagogue

- Born: Gert Olof Sigurd Eriksson; 28 March 1916; Gävle, Sweden
- Died: 6 June 2002 (aged 86); London, England, United Kingdom
- Occupations: Dancer, acting teacher

Yat Malmgren (28 March 1916 – 6 June 2002) was a Swedish dancer and acting teacher. He was born in Gävle, Sweden, as Gert Olof Sigurd Eriksson, to Gustaf Sigurd Eriksson and Signe Emma Maria Malmgren, but changed his surname because of his strained relationship with his father. He used his mother's maiden name, Malmgren, instead. He became known as Yat rather than Gert when he lived in Britain because of difficulties with the Swedish pronunciation of the letter G.

== Early life and performing career ==
At 16 Malmgren intended to become a priest, but was dissuaded by his father. Instead in 1935 he began training as an actor with Julia Hakanson of the Svenska Teatern, and the following year as a dancer with Sven Trop, Ballet Master of the Royal Opera in Stockholm. In 1938 he went to Berlin to train with Eugenie Edwardova, former character dancer with Pavlova, and with Trude Engelhardt of the Mary Wigman company. While still in training he gave solo recitals throughout Sweden, followed in 1939-40 by solo recitals in Stockholm, Berlin, Warsaw and Paris where he began studying with Mme Preobrajenska. He was awarded the Gold medal at the Concours de la Danse in Brussels in 1939 and was spotted by Kurt Jooss who invited him to join Ballets Jooss based at Dartington Hall. It was here that he first met Rudolf Laban with whom he later collaborated in developing his theory of Movement Psychology. During the war he toured as a soloist with Ballets Jooss throughout the British Isles, Ireland, Canada, North and South America. He left the company in Buenos Ayres and spent the rest of the war period in Brazil, partnering the ballerina Nini Theilade in solo recitals and opening a movement school in Rio de Janeiro.

He returned to Europe in 1947 to give recitals in Sweden and Finland with Nini Theilade. In 1948 he was invited to join the International Ballet Company as premier danseur, and continued his training with Judith Espinosa in London, and Mmes Preobrajenska and Egorova in Paris. He appeared as 'the Baron' in Gaite Parisienne opposite the choreographer Massine, in his old role. A season at Teatro Municipal in Rio de Janeiro with Tatiana Leskova in 1950 was followed by tours throughout Britain and Europe.

In 1954, following a serious injury he was forced to retire as a dancer, and began teaching classes at the International School of Ballet in London. The actor Harold Lang persuaded him to start giving movement classes in the Anna Northcote studio in West Street, Covent Garden, and actors including Sean Connery, Diane Cilento, Patricia Neal, Gillian Lynne, Brian Bedford and Anthony Hopkins together with directors Tony Richardson, Bill Gaskill, Alexander Mackendrick and Seth Holt all attended. He worked privately with Sean Connery for a year who appeared in 'Anna Christie' in Oxford, and particularly as Dionysus in Euripides's the Bacchae before his first success as James Bond.

== Teaching career ==
Malmgren was a key figure at the Drama Centre London along with co-founder Christopher Fettes, John and Catherine Blatchley (Clouzot), Harold Lang and Doreen Cannon. His teaching approach drew from the applied psychology of movement developed by Laban. Malmgren's method of character development is concerned with a technique for expressing the inner state of a character through movement, and is a synthesis of Laban's theory of movement expression, C. G. Jung's character types (published in 1923) and key principles of acting established by Constantin Stanislavski. Malmgren taught a number of famous actors including: Sean Connery, Pierce Brosnan, Colin Firth, Anthony Hopkins, Geraldine James, Helen McCrory, Paul Bettany, Russell Brand, Anne-Marie Duff, John Simm, Diane Cilento, Michael Fassbender and Tom Hardy.

== Publications ==
Christopher Fettes' book 'A Peopled Labyrinth - an Analysis of the Actor's Craft' (The Laban-Carpenter ‘Theory of Movement Psychology’ adapted and brought to completion by Yat Malmgren) (GFCA, 2015) describes Malmgren's system in depth, with numerous examples from classical plays and literature. An article describing the main features of Malmgren's approach to actor training, and bringing these up to date with aspects of contemporary thinking on cognitive science is Vladimir Mirodan, 'Acting the Metaphor - The Laban-Malmgren system of movement psychology and character analysis', Theatre, Dance and Performance Training Journal, Vol. 6, Issue 1, 2015. In his book 'The Actor and the Character' (Routledge, 2019) Mirodan also looks at Malmgren's work in the wider context of the relationship between the personalities of actors and the nature of the fictional character. The system is also described in detail in two PhD theses. The first, entitled "The Way of Transformation (The Laban – Malmgren System of Character Analysis)" is by Vladimir Mirodan, Principal of the Drama Centre 2001-2011. This thesis is available online through the British Library. The second, entitled "The Knowing Body: Meaning and method in Yat Malmgren's actor training technique" is by Janys Hayes and is available through the National Library of Australia.

Institutions around the world have taught the method developed by Malmgren, which has come to be known as the "Yat" method of character analysis. These institutions include - in London: the Drama Centre, James Kemp's Effort Productions, the Giles Foreman Centre for Acting (GFCA also has centres in Paris, New York, Los Angeles), the Royal Central School of Speech and Drama and the London Academy of Music and Dramatic Art (LAMDA). Elsewhere: the Schott Acting Studio in Berlin, the Yat/Bentley Centre for Performance in San Francisco, Los Angeles and New York (co-founded by Tom Bentley-Fisher and Leah Herman, and run by Tom Bentley-Fisher), and Gothenburg University, Sweden, where Yat received an honorary doctorate. His work is popular in Australia, where Tim Robins taught it at The Nimrod Theatre Acting Classes, The Drama Studio (Sydney) and Australia's National Institute of Dramatic Art (NIDA). Other teachers in Australia included Janys Hayes at the University of Wollongong, New South Wales, Harry Haynes at the 16th Street School (Melbourne) and the late Penelope Chater, who also taught it in Toronto for 30 years. Yat Malmgren's work also influences training in Israel, Peru, Iran, Brazil, Iceland and Denmark, amongst many others. At the Drama Centre, Yat Malmgren was succeeded by several teachers, including James Kemp, Tim Robins and Mathew Wernham.
