= Oxford School of Drama =

English drama school

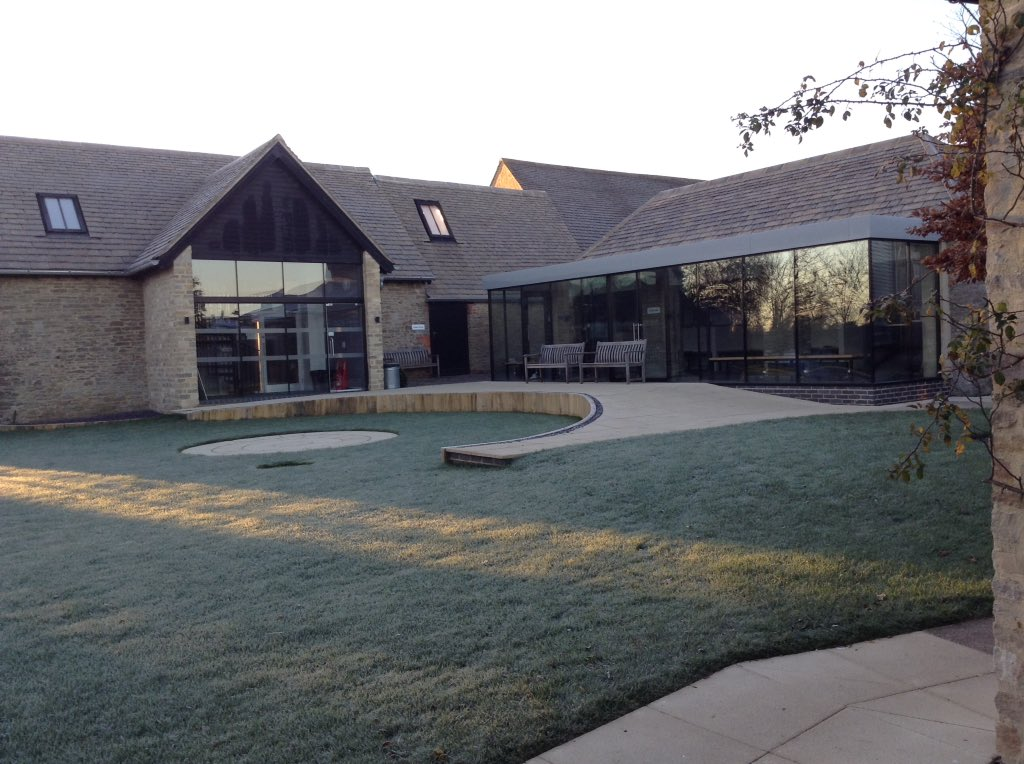

Location
- Sansomes Farm Studios; Wootton, Woodstock, Oxfordshire, OX20 1ER; England
- Coordinates: 51.867683°N 1.347082°W

Information
- Type: Drama school
- Ofsted: Reports
- Principal: Edward Hicks
- Affiliations: Federation of Drama Schools
- Website: http://oxforddrama.ac.uk

The Oxford School of Drama is a drama school in the United Kingdom. It is based at Wootton, ten miles north of Oxford.

The school is an independent, vocational drama school which runs a three-year acting course and a one-year acting course, both validated by Trinity College, London.

The school is governed by a board of trustees, which includes Graham Upton and Cassie Bradley. It is a member of the Federation of Drama Schools.
