= Guildford School of Acting =

University of Surrey drama school, England

- Type: Drama school
- Established: 1935
- Parent institution: University of Surrey
- Accreditation: CDMT
- Academic affiliations: Federation of Drama Schools
- Head: Catherine McNamara
- Location: Stag Hill Campus, Guildford, Surrey, GU2 7XH, England; 51°14′34″N 0°35′44″W
- Website: gsauk.org
- Location within Surrey

Guildford School of Acting (GSA) is a drama school in Guildford, Surrey, England. It is an academic school in the University of Surrey. It is a member of the Federation of Drama Schools.

== Overview ==
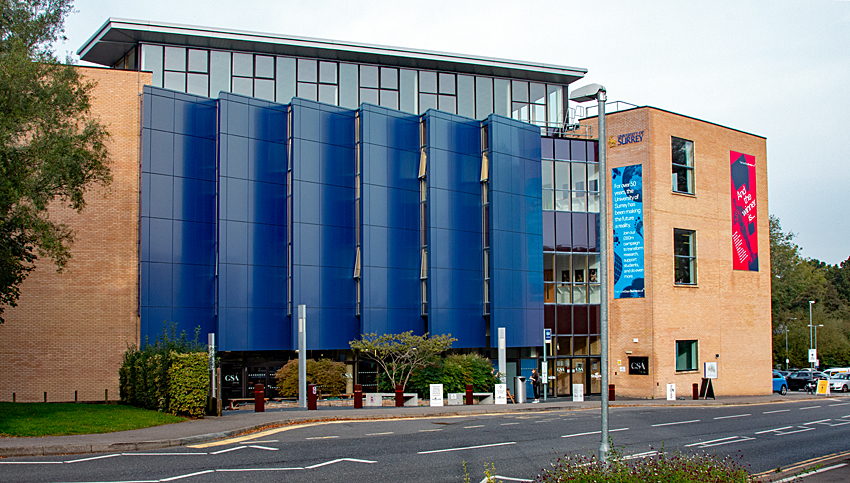
GSA building, Stag Hill campus

The school is part of the University of Surrey and offers a range of undergraduate and postgraduate courses in acting, musical theatre, and production. In addition to undergraduate programmes, GSA also offers postgraduate programmes, including a Master of Fine Arts (MFA) in Acting, an MFA in Musical Theatre, and a Master of Arts (MA) in Theatre Practices.

The university also hosts the National Resource Centre for Dance, established in 1982.

== History ==
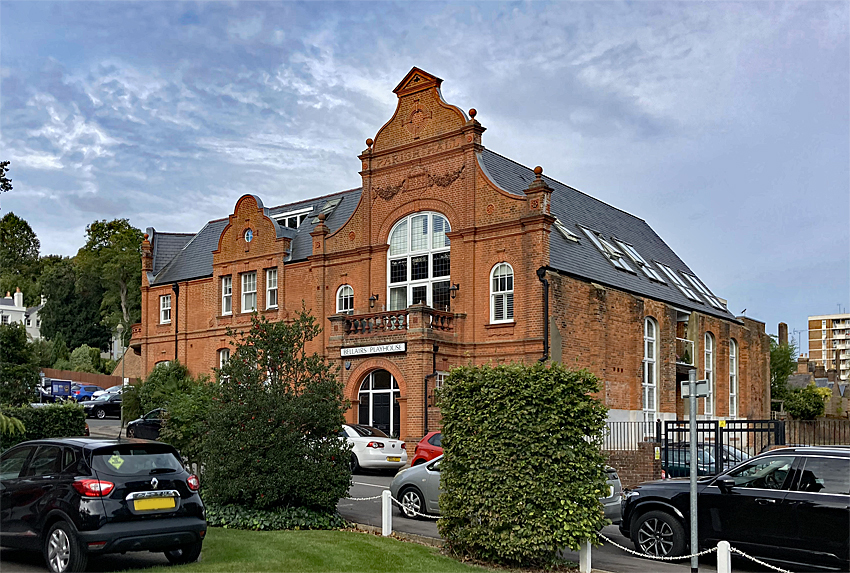
The former Bellairs Playhouse

The school was founded as the Grant-Bellairs School of Dance and Drama in London in 1935. At the outbreak of World War II it relocated to Guildford. From 1945 to 2010 the school was housed in the former St Nicholas parish hall and working men's club at Millmead Terrace. In 1964, the school was renamed the Guildford School of Acting and Dance. In the 1990s, the word "Dance" was removed from the title, allegedly because former student Bill Nighy referred to it as the "Guildford School of Twirlies". In 2009 the school became part of the University of Surrey and in 2010 moved into new purpose-built accommodation next to the refurbished Ivy Arts Centre, formerly the sports centre, on the Stag Hill campus.

== Facilities ==
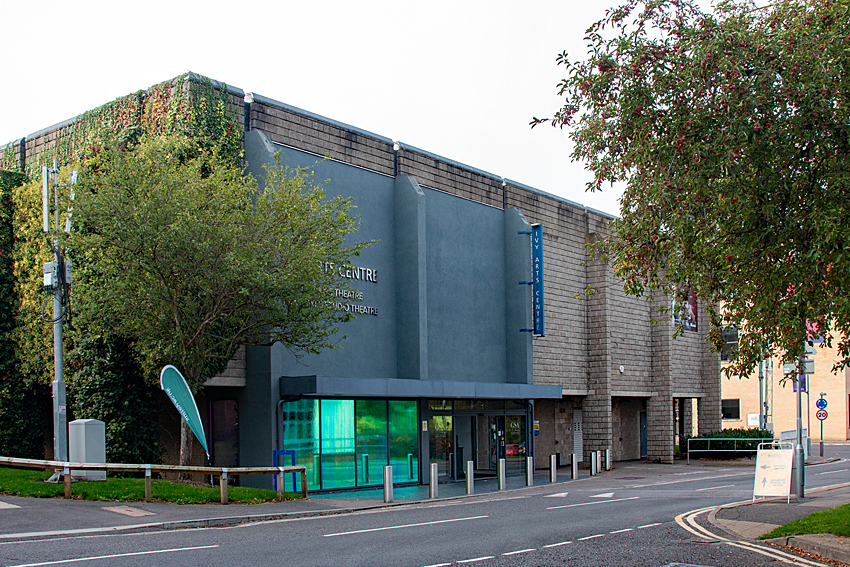
Ivy Arts Centre

The main school building has 15 dance and rehearsal studios, and 10 tutorial/practice rooms. The Ivy Arts centre houses the 190-seat Bellairs Theatre, named after Beatrice "Bice" Bellairs, one of the original co-founders, and the 80-seat Rex Doyle studio theatre named after the actor and GSA alumnus. In addition the Performing Arts Technology Studios building has a 128-seat theatre which can also be used.
