= Royal Conservatoire of Scotland =

Conservatoire in Glasgow, Scotland

Coordinates: 55.86254°N 4.25670°W

- Scottish Gaelic: Conservatoire Rìoghail na h-Alba
- The Royal Conservatoire of Scotland
- Former names: Royal Scottish Academy of Music and Drama
- Type: Conservatoire
- Established: 1993 – granted degree-awarding powers 1847 – Glasgow Athenaeum
- Affiliations: Conservatoires UK; Associated Board of the Royal Schools of Music; University of St Andrews; Association of European Conservatoires; Conference of Drama Schools
- President: Nicola Benedetti (Honorary)
- Principal: Jeffrey Sharkey
- Patron: Charles III
- Students: 1,230 (2024/25)
- Undergraduates: 870 (2024/25)
- Postgraduates: 360 (2024/25)
- Location: Glasgow, Scotland, UK
- Colours
- Website: rcs.ac.uk

The Royal Conservatoire of Scotland (Scottish Gaelic: Acadamh-chiùil Rìoghail na h-Alba), formerly the Royal Scottish Academy of Music and Drama (Scottish Gaelic: Acadamaidh Rìoghail Ciùil is Dràma na h-Alba) is a conservatoire of dance, drama, music, production, and film in Glasgow, Scotland. It is a member of the Federation of Drama Schools.

Founded in 1847, it has become the busiest performing arts venue in Scotland with over 500 public performances each year. The current principal is American pianist and composer Jeffrey Sharkey. The patron is King Charles III.

== History ==
The Royal Conservatoire has occupied its current purpose-built building on Renfrew Street in Glasgow since 1988. Its roots lie in several organisations. Officially founded in 1847 by Moses Provan as part of the Glasgow Athenaeum, from an earlier Educational Association grouping, music and arts were provided alongside courses in commercial skills, literature, languages, sciences and mathematics. Courses were open and affordable, including day classes for ladies, and the Athenaeum had a reading room, news room, library and social facilities. Apprentices could also be members. Rented accommodation was found in the Assembly Rooms, Ingram Street, with major lectures taking place in the City Halls. The chairman at its inaugural Grand Soiree in the City Halls in December 1847 was Charles Dickens when in his opening remarks he stated that he regarded the Glasgow Athenaeum as "an educational example and encouragement to the rest of Scotland". Its Dramatic Club was formed in 1886 a year before the institution moved to purpose-built premises, inclusive of a major concert hall/theatre, in St George's Place close to West Nile Street, designed by architect John Burnet.

In 1888, the commercial teaching separated to form the Athenaeum Commercial College, which, after several rebrandings and a merger, became the University of Strathclyde in 1964. The non-commercial teaching side became the Glasgow Athenaeum School of Music.

In 1893 additional premises linked through to Buchanan Street and included a new Athenaeum Theatre facing Buchanan Street designed by architect Sir John James Burnet. In 1928 the premises were substantially extended with a gift from the philanthropist Daniel Macaulay Stevenson. In 1929 the school was renamed as the Scottish National Academy of Music to better reflect its scope and purpose. This major acquisition of space at the corner of St George's Place (later renamed Nelson Mandela Place) and Buchanan Street was the Liberal Club (now not required by that party), designed originally by architect Alexander Skirving and remodelled by architects Campbell Douglas and Paterson in 1907.

Its principal from 1929 to 1941 was William Gillies Whittaker. In 1944, it became the Royal Scottish Academy of Music.

The Royal Scottish Academy of Music established a drama department called the Glasgow College of Dramatic Art during 1950. It became the first British drama school to contain a full, broadcast-specification television studio in 1962. In 1968 the Royal Scottish Academy of Music changed its name to the Royal Scottish Academy of Music and Drama (RSAMD) and introduced its first degree courses, which were validated by the University of Glasgow.

During 1987–88 the academy moved to its present site some two hundred yards north in Renfrew Street at Hope Street, across from the Theatre Royal, the new building having been designed by architect Sir Leslie Martin with executive architects William Nimmo and Partners.

In 1993 RSAMD became the first conservatoire in the United Kingdom to be granted its own degree-awarding powers. Research degrees undertaken at RCS are validated and awarded by the University of St Andrews. RCS is one of four member conservatories of the Associated Board of the Royal Schools of Music.

=== Incorporation of full title ===
From 1 September 2011, the RSAMD deferred to its full title The Royal Conservatoire of Scotland. The name has deep roots and the change was confirmed after a long consultation process that involved the principal John Wallace and the academy's board of directors, as well as past and present students and staff, arts & academic institutions, politicians, and the Royal Protocol Unit.

The principal said the change was necessary as it was no longer simply a music and drama academy. Undergraduate courses in areas such as Digital Film & Television, Production Arts and Design, Production Technology and Management, Musical Theatre and Modern Ballet (in partnership with Scottish Ballet) have been added to the degrees the Royal Conservatoire offers. He felt it was best to choose a name that was representative of all disciplines offered.

== International ranking ==
The Royal Conservatoire of Scotland has been consistently ranked among the best schools in the world in Quacquarelli Symonds (QS)'s Performing Arts ranking since the latter was established in 2016. The Conservatoire has been in the top 10 five out of six years, reaching 3rd place in 2017 and 2021. In 2022, RCS ranked fifth in the world for Performing Arts Education.

== Facilities ==
The Whittaker Library is housed in the Renfrew Street campus. It contains one of the largest collections of sheet music, scripts and other performing items in both the United Kingdom and the world.

In 2010, RCS opened its second campus near Cowcaddens, now known as the "Wallace Studios at Speirs Locks". This building was designed by Malcolm Fraser. It opened predominantly to house the Modern Ballet and Production courses, as the Renfrew Street campus was struggling to accommodate the combination of new courses and higher intake levels. In 2014, a £2 million extension to this second campus was built, creating even more rehearsal spaces and improved facilities for the students.

== Principals ==
- Jeffrey Sharkey 2014 to Present
- John Wallace 2002 to 2014
- Philip Ledger 1982 to 2001
- David Lumsden 1976 to 1982
- Kenneth Barritt 1969 to 1976
- Henry Havergal 1953 to 1969
- Ernest Bullock 1941 to 1952
- William G. Whittaker 1929 to 1941

== Alumni ==
- Billy Boyd
- Isla Callister
- Robert Carlyle
- Tom Conti
- Joyce Falconer
- Colin Firth
- Beth Gallagher
- John Hannah
- Shauna Macdonald
- James McAvoy
- David Tennant
- Ruby Wax

== See also ==
- Music Schools in Scotland
- List of further and higher education colleges in Scotland
- Conservatoires UK
- Music of Scotland
- Culture in Glasgow
- Culture of Scotland
- Scottish Ballet
- Scottish Opera
