= Reigate School =

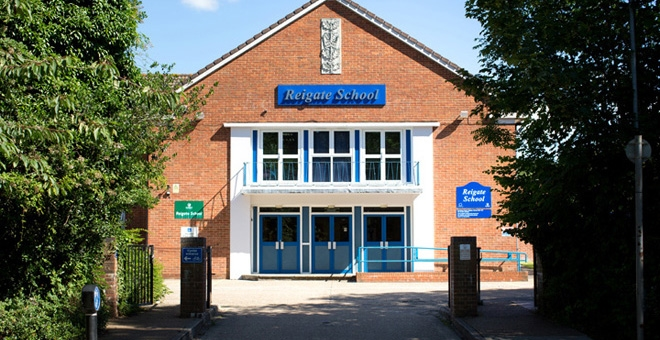

Location
- Pendleton Road; Reigate, Surrey, RH2 7NT; England
- Coordinates: 51°13′28″N 0°11′36″W

Information
- Type: Academy
- Motto: Helping children achieve their academic, social and personal potential.
- Local authority: Surrey County Council
- Trust: Greensand Multi-Academy Trust
- Department for Education URN: 145217 Tables
- Ofsted: Reports
- Headteacher: Matt Alexander
- Gender: Co-educational
- Age: 11 to 16
- Enrolment: 1,262 (2020)
- Capacity: 1,250
- Houses: Attenborough, Parks, Curie and Turing
- Colours: Blue and yellow-gold
- Website: www.reigate-school.surrey.sch.uk

Reigate School (previously Woodhatch County Secondary School and then just Woodhatch Secondary School), is an 11–16 mixed secondary school with academy status in Reigate, Surrey, England. It has been a part of the Greensand Multi-Academy Trust since 1 November 2017, and currently serves as the only secondary school within the trust.
