= Drama Centre London =

UK drama school

Coordinates: 51°31′22″N 0°6′33″W

- Active: 1963–2022
- Parent institution: Central Saint Martins (University of the Arts London)
- Affiliations: Federation of Drama Schools
- Location: London, England, United Kingdom
- Website: arts.ac.uk/csm/drama-centre-london

Drama Centre London (often abbreviated as Drama Centre) was a British drama school in King's Cross, London, where it moved in 2011 after a major reshaping of the University of the Arts London. It was part of Central Saint Martins, a constituent college of the university. Following a review in 2020, the school closed with the graduation of its final students in 2022.

Whilst in operation, Drama Centre London was a member of the Federation of Drama Schools, it offered BA (Hons) and MA acting courses.

== History ==
Drama Centre London was founded in 1963 by a breakaway group of teachers and students from the Central School of Speech and Drama, led by John Blatchley, Yat Malmgren and Christopher Fettes. It was originally based in a Methodist church at 176 Prince of Wales Road, Chalk Farm, but moved first to Back Hill, Clerkenwell in 2004, then to King's Cross in 2011. From 1999 to 2020, it operated as an integral school of Central Saint Martins College of Arts and Design, offering degree programmes in acting, directing and screenwriting.

A principal aim in the school's founding was to bring some of the major developments in American and European theatre to the training of British and international actors. Its approach articulated Stanislavski's system, with the movement work of Rudolf Laban and the character typology of Carl Jung to produce a 'movement psychology' for the analysis and development of characters. Its work also drew on the English tradition, particularly that of Joan Littlewood and Theatre Workshop. These approaches were taught as part of the Western theatrical tradition that began with the Greeks, on which the school placed great emphasis. When the school was founded, it was England's only drama school with an acting class, and was considered the first Method drama school in Britain.

Because of its rigour, the school's nickname was "Trauma Centre". Like most drama schools, Drama Centre placed a particular emphasis on the work of Konstantin Stanislavski, also training students in improvisation through the Yevgeny Vakhtangov and Jacques Lecoq traditions. It offered a theatre-based training incorporating both modern and classical texts; and prepared actors for the demands of screen acting, for which it had a two-year postgraduate course. In September 2005, it launched its MA Acting course (formerly 'European Classical Acting') including residencies at both the Vakhtangov Theatre Institute in Moscow and Imalis Center for Ancient Hellenic Theatre in Epidaurus, Greece.

The Drama Centre was the first British drama school to introduce some of the great classics of the Spanish, German and French repertoires, a precedent reflected in connections between many schools in the UK, US, Russia and China.

In March 2020 UAL announced that they were to close the Drama Centre, following an unfavourable review of the centre's provision for academic development, quality assurance and equal opportunities. Students currently enrolled would complete their training.

== Platform Theatre ==
The Platform Theatre is a receiving and producing theatre in the Central Saint Martin's complex at King's Cross. It holds 360 in a variety of configurations, has an orchestra pit and a full flying tower and is equipped to high professional standards. It aims to present all aspects of the performing arts. Productions by students of Drama Centre London were presented there, and work by students of other colleges of the University of the Arts, London.
