= Drama Studio London =

Drama school in London, United Kingdom

Coordinates: 51.5094°N 0.3050°W

- Other name: DSL
- Type: Drama school
- Affiliations: Federation of Drama Schools
- Students: 100
- Location: Ealing, England
- Website: dramastudiolondon.co.uk
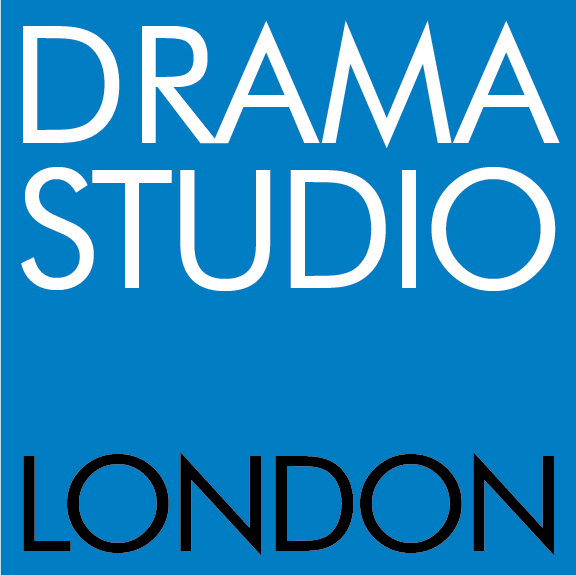

Drama Studio London (DSL) is a British drama school in London. It is accredited by the Federation of Drama Schools. The principal is Emma Lucia Hands.

The Drama Studio London was started in 1966 by Peter Layton. It focuses on developing individual talent, rather than teaching conventional acting styles. It offers a three-year Bachelor of Arts in 'professional acting', validated by the University of West London; a one-year postgraduate diploma/MA in professional acting; a two-year Master of Fine Arts in acting with independent production and from 2025 a Foundation Diploma in Performance (Cert HE)*.

== Alumni ==
- Enzo Cilenti
- Alexander Gifford
- Paul Forman
- Trevor Cooper
- Misha Crosby
- Roma Downey
- Cory English
- Lisa Goldman
- Jack Greenlees
- Aiysha Hart
- Diana Hayden
- Ursula Holden-Gill
- Adil Hussain
- Shobu Kapoor
- Elisa Lasowski
- Nadine Lewington
- Adrian Lukis
- David Marciano
- Peter Howitt
- Pip Torrens
- Charles Martinet
- Murray McArthur
- Jim Piddock
- Natasha Radski
- Helen Schlesinger
- Mika Simmons
- Cynthia Stevenson
- Lesley Vickerage
- Olivia Vinall
- Emily Watson
- Forest Whitaker
