= Federation of Drama Schools =

British organization

- Abbreviation: FDS
- Predecessor: Drama UK
- Formation: 13 June 2017
- Type: Federation
- Purpose: Provides vocational drama training
- Headquarters: London
- Location: England
- Region served: United Kingdom
- Chairman: Sean McNamara
- Website: www.federationofdramaschools.co.uk

The Federation of Drama Schools functions to facilitate vocational drama training in the UK. It was formed in June 2017.

== History ==
A formal organisation for drama training in the UK was first established with the Conference of Drama Schools (CDS) in 1969. This was followed by the National Council for Drama Training in 1976, which was primarily responsible for accrediting courses offered by the Conference of Drama Schools. In July 2012 both national organisations were merged to form a single regulatory body called Drama UK. The Federation of Drama Schools was formed on 13 June 2017 following the abolition of Drama UK in 2016 after a period of instability in which several high-profile schools quit the organisation. Unlike its predecessor, the membership body will not provide independent accreditation for schools, but all members commit to adhering to a set of 'guiding hallmarks'.

== Members ==
Members of the Federation of Drama Schools include:

1. Bristol Old Vic Theatre School
2. Drama Studio London
3. East 15 Acting School (E15)
4. Guildford School of Acting (GSA)
5. Guildhall School of Music and Drama
6. Italia Conti Academy of Theatre Arts (Italia Conti)
7. London Academy of Music and Dramatic Art (LAMDA)
8. Liverpool Institute for Performing Arts (LIPA)
9. Manchester School of Theatre
10. Mountview Academy of Theatre Arts
11. Oxford School of Drama
12. Rose Bruford College
13. Royal Academy of Dramatic Art (RADA)
14. Royal Central School of Speech and Drama (RCSSD, formerly CSSD)
15. Royal Conservatoire of Scotland (RCS, formerly RSAMD)
16. Royal Welsh College of Music & Drama (RWCMD)
17. The Northern School of Art

== See also ==
- Conference of Drama Schools
- Drama UK
- National Council for Drama Training
