= National Council for Drama Training =

Partnership for employer

- Abbreviation: NCDT
- Merged into: Conference of Drama Schools
- Successor: Drama UK
- Formation: 1976
- Dissolved: 31 July 2012
- Type: partnership
- Headquarters: 1-7 Woburn Walk, London, WC1H 0JJ
- Location: England
- Region served: United Kingdom

The National Council for Drama Training (NCDT) was a partnership of employers in the theatre, broadcast and media industry, employee representatives and training providers from 1976 to 2012.

== History ==
The National Council for Drama Training (NCDT) was established in 1976 following the publication of the Calouste Gulbenkian Foundation report 'Going on the Stage' into professional training for drama. NCDT has been supported by the performing arts industry and charged with maintaining standards at the nation's top drama schools. For many years NCDT has been providing assurance for students, their parents and funders that courses approved by NCDT are preparing students for careers in the drama profession. The council existed to act as a champion for the industry by working to optimise support for professional drama training and education, embracing change and development. Its primary role was to safeguard the highest standards and provides a credible process of quality assurance through accreditation for vocational drama courses in further and higher education in the UK. In 2012 they merged with the Conference of Drama Schools to form Drama UK.

== See also ==
- Acting
- Actor
- Drama school
- Performing arts education
