= Drama school =

School of performance art

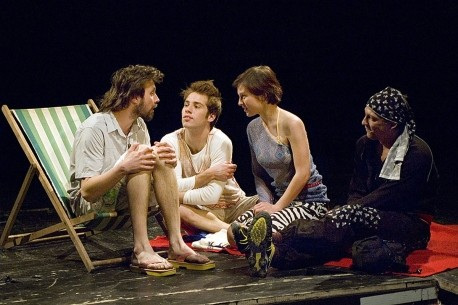
Drama students performing onstage

Drama school, acting school, and actor school is an undergraduate and/or graduate school or department at a college or university, or a free-standing institution (such as the drama section at the Juilliard School) that specializes in the pre-professional training in drama and "theatre" arts, such as acting, design and technical theatre, arts administration, and related subjects. If the drama school is part of a degree-granting institution, undergraduates typically take an associate degree, Bachelor of Arts, Bachelor of Fine Arts, or, occasionally, Bachelor of Science or Bachelor of Design. Graduate students may take a Master of Arts, Master of Acting, Master of Science, Master of Fine Arts, Doctor of Arts, Doctor of Fine Arts, or Doctor of Philosophy degree.

== Entry and application process ==
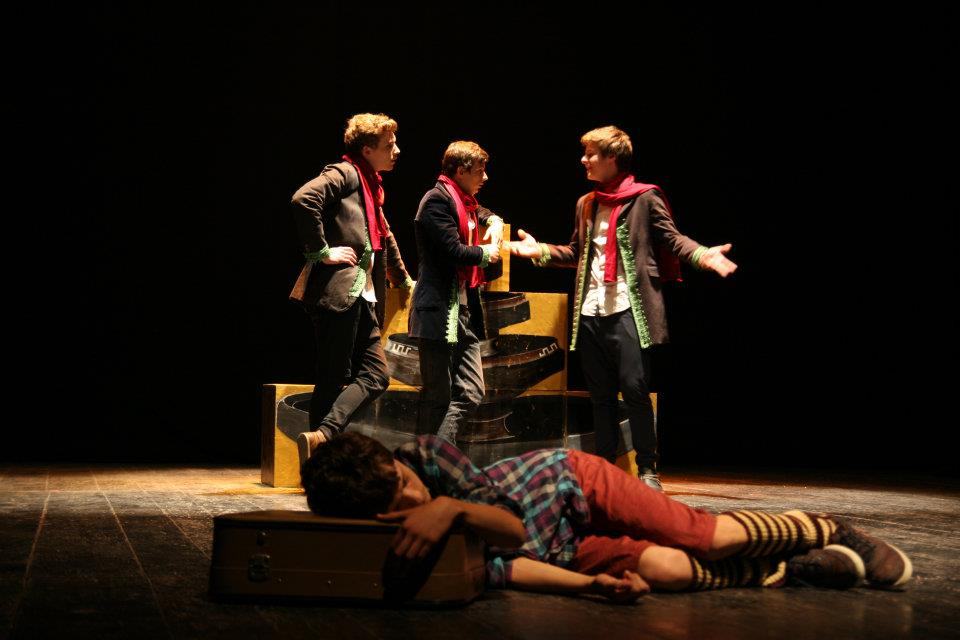
Romanian students (Drama Club Botosani) in a modern interpretation of The Taming of the Shrew

Entry to drama school is usually through a competitive audition process. Some schools make this a two-stage process. Places on an acting course are limited (usually well below 100) so those who fare best at the audition are selected. Most academies state that applicants must be over 18 years of age. Auditions usually involve the performance of monologues, singing, and group workshops.

== Course content ==
The courses offered by drama schools focus on practical courses, rather than theoretical classes. Their aim is to train students as professional actors for stage, film, and television. At the beginning of the final year (usually the third), most drama schools stage a series of performances throughout the academic year to which agents and casting directors are invited. This helps to build the future of the graduates and serves as a showcase of what the students can do.

=== United Kingdom ===
In 1833, actress Frances Maria Kelly managed the Royal Strand Theatre where she funded and operated a dramatic school, the earliest record of a drama school in England. In 1840 she financed the building of the Royalty Theatre in Soho which opened as Miss Kelly's Theatre and Dramatic School. The London Academy of Music and Dramatic Art (LAMDA) remains both the UK's oldest drama school still in existence and was established in 1861.

==== Federation membership ====
The Conference of Drama Schools was an organisation that comprised Britain's 22 leading Drama Schools. CDS existed to strengthen the voice of the member schools, to set and maintain the highest standards of training within the vocational drama sector, and to make it easier for prospective students to understand the range of courses on offer and the application process. Founded in 1969, the 22 member schools continue to offer courses in Acting, Musical Theatre, Directing and Technical Theatre training. Graduates of CDS courses are currently working on stage, in front of the camera and behind the scenes in theatres and studios across Britain. In 2012, CDS was merged with the National Council for Drama Training to create a single national authority Drama UK responsible for both the provision of Drama Training and accreditation of official courses. In 2017, Drama UK was replaced by the Federation of Drama Schools.

Top drama schools in the UK are members of the mission group Conservatoires UK, which also includes the country's world-leading music schools.

==== Funding ====
In the UK, funding varies from drama school to drama school. Historically drama schools were not part of the mainstream academic system, and therefore were not funded on the same basis as universities. Some drama schools are now part of a university, such as Guildhall School of Music and Drama, which is part of the City University of London, and Rose Bruford College of Theatre and Performance, which is part of the University of Manchester, and these tend to charge similar tuition fees to universities. Student loans, drama awards and scholarships may help to provide students with their funding. The most prominent funding scheme for performing arts education in the UK are the Dance and Drama Awards. This is a government scheme which subsidises the training offered at a selection of the leading performing arts schools in the fields of dance, drama, musical theatre and stage management.

=== Ireland ===
A number of tertiary institutions provide courses in Drama and Theatre Studies, including Trinity College, Dublin, NUI Maynooth, and Dublin City University. A decision by Trinity in January 2007 to drop its BA in Acting Studies to cut costs met with disappointment from the theatre sector. A Forum for Acting Training was convened with leading professionals who recommended in a 2008 report, that an Academy for Dramatic Arts, independent of a university, but with third level accreditation should be created. The report was submitted to the Irish Government. On 1 August 2008, The Irish Times reported that a RADA graduate, Danielle Ryan, granddaughter of the late Tony Ryan who founded Ryanair, had announced plans to develop an Irish Academy of Dramatic Arts part-funded from a Trust created by her late father, Captain Cathal Ryan.

This plan went ahead and the academy, known as The Lir Academy, opened in September 2011. The Lir is part of Trinity College and is situated in the Grand Canal Dock area. It is officially associated with RADA.

== Drama schools outside the UK and Ireland ==
=== Australia ===
- Aboriginal Centre for the Performing Arts (ACPA), Fortitude Valley, Brisbane
- Australian Institute of Music - Dramatic Arts, Sydney
- Australian Performing Arts Conservatory, Brisbane
- Faculty of Fine Arts and Music, University of Melbourne
- Helpmann Academy, Adelaide
- National Institute of Dramatic Art (NIDA), Randwick, Sydney
- National Theatre, Melbourne
- Screenwise Surry Hills, Sydney
- Western Australian Academy of Performing Arts (WAAPA), Edith Cowan University, Perth

=== Austria ===
- University of Music and Performing Arts Graz, Graz
- Institute for Theatre and Drama (ACT), Anton Bruckner Private University, Linz
- University of Mozarteum, Salzburg
- Max Reinhardt Seminar, University of Music and Performing Arts, Vienna
- Music and Arts University of the City of Vienna, Vienna
- Theatre, Film and Media Studies - University of Vienna

=== Belgium ===
- AcSenT (Academie voor Spel en Theater (Antwerp)
- $ARTS^2$, École supérieure des Arts (Mons)
- Erasmushogeschool Brussel (English name: Erasmus University College Brussels)
- Institut national supérieur des arts du spectacle et des techniques de diffusion (INSAS), Brussels
- Faculty of Arts and Philosophy, Ghent University
- LUCA School of Arts, KU Leuven (Brussels)
- Royal Academy of Fine Arts Antwerp (Antwerp)
- Royal Conservatory of Ghent, University College Ghent (Ghent/Aalst)
- Royal Conservatory of Liège (Liège)
- Institut des arts de diffusion (Louvain-la-Neuve)

=== Canada ===
==== Alberta ====
- School of Creative and Performing arts, University of Calgary (Calgary)
- Drama Department, University of Lethbridge Calgary Campus (Calgary)
- Department of Fine Arts and Humanities, University of Alberta Augustana Campus (Camrose)
- Department of Fine Arts, Concordia University of Edmonton (Edmonton)
- Department of Theatre, MacEwan University (Edmonton)
- Department of Drama, University of Alberta (Edmonton)
- Drama Department, University of Lethbridge (Lethbridge)

==== British Columbia ====
- University of the Fraser Valley (Abbotsford)
- Faculty of Arts, Thompson Rivers University (Kamloops)
- Kelowna Actors Studio (Kelowna)
- School of the Arts, Media + Culture - Trinity Western University (Langley)
- School of Performing Arts, Capilano University (North Vancouver)
- New Image College (Vancouver)
- School for the Contemporary Arts, Simon Fraser University (Vancouver)
- Studio 58 (Vancouver)
- Department of Theatre and Film, University of British Columbia (Vancouver)
- VanArts (Vancouver)
- Faculty of Fine Arts, University of Victoria (Victoria)

==== Manitoba ====
- Faculty of Arts, Brandon University (Brandon)
- Department of English, Theatre, Film & Media at the University of Manitoba (Winnipeg)
- Department of Theatre and Film, University of Winnipeg (Winnipeg)

==== New Brunswick ====
- Department of Dramatic Art, Université de Moncton (Moncton)
- Department of Drama Studies, Mount Allison University (Sackville)
- InterAction School of Performing Arts, Saint John

==== Newfoundland and Labrador ====
- School of Fine Arts, Memorial University of Newfoundland (Corner Brook)

==== Nova Scotia ====
- Fountain School of Performing Arts, Dalhousie University (Halifax)
- Faculty of Arts and Social Science, University of King's College (Halifax)
- Department of English & Theatre, Acadia University (Wolfville)

==== Ontario ====
- School of English & Theatre Studies, University of Guelph (Guelph)
- School of the Arts (SOTA), McMaster University (Hamilton)
- Queen's University Dan School of Drama & Music (Kingston)
- Department of Theatre, University of Ottawa
- Marilyn I. Walker School of Fine and Performing Arts, Brock University (St. Catharines)
- Faculty of Arts, Laurentian University (Sudbury)
- Centennial College Theatre Arts and Performance (Toronto)
- Centre for Drama, Theatre & Performance Studies - University of Toronto
- Centre for Indigenous Theatre (Toronto)
- Theatre Arts - Performance, Humber College (Toronto)
- George Brown Theatre School (Toronto)
- Randolph Academy for the Performing Arts (Toronto)
- Shakespeare's Globe Centres (Toronto)
- School of the Arts, Media, Performance & Design - York University (Toronto)
- School of Dramatic Art, University of Windsor (Windsor)

==== Quebec ====
- Conservatoire d'art dramatique de Montréal
- Montréal Children's Theatre
- National Theatre School of Canada (Montréal)
- Faculty of Arts, Université du Québec à Montréal
- Université Laval (Quebec City)
- Department of Drama, Bishop's University (Sherbrooke)

==== Saskatchewan ====
- Faculty of Media, Art, and Performance - University of Regina (Regina)
- Department of Drama, University of Saskatchewan (Saskatoon)

=== Denmark ===
- Den Danske Scenekunstskole (Aarhus, Copenhagen, Odense)
- Copenaghen International School of Performing Arts

=== France ===
- Conservatoire national Supérieur D'art Dramatique

=== Russia ===
- Russian Institute of Theatre Arts, Moscow
- Boris Shchukin Theatre Institute, Moscow
- Mikhail Shchepkin Higher Theatre School, Moscow
- Moscow Art Theatre School, Moscow
- Russian State Institute of Performing Arts, Saint Petersburg
- Novosibirsk State Theater Institute, Novosibirsk
- Yaroslavl State Theater Institute, Yaroslavl
- Yekaterinburg State Theater Institute, Yekaterinburg

=== India ===
- National School of Drama, New Delhi
- Shri Ram Centre for Performing Arts, New Delhi
- Ninasam, Karnataka
- Bharatendu Academy of Dramatic Arts, Lucknow
- Madhya Pradesh School of Drama, Bhopal

== See also ==
- Acting coach
- Acting workshop
