= List of University of Surrey academics =

A list of University of Surrey academics, includes those who work or have worked at the University of Surrey, including a brief description of their notability.

== Science and engineering ==
- Alf Adams – physicist who pioneered the strained quantum-well laser
- Jim Al-Khalili – nuclear physicist, author and broadcaster
- Lewis Elton – physicist and researcher into higher education
- Sir Martin Sweeting – founder of Surrey Satellite Technology Ltd
- Allan Wells – Olympic 100m gold medalist; engineering lecturer
- Henryk Zygalski – mathematician, cryptologist and breaker of the Enigma Machine
- Max Lu – chemical engineer and nanotechnologist, Vice-Chancellor of the University of Surrey as at 2024.

== Humanities and social science ==
- Sara Arber – sociologist
- Martyn Barrett – psychologist and lead expert for the Council of Europe's Education Policy Advisers Network
- David Blanchflower – economist and member of the Monetary Policy Committee
- Dame Glynis Breakwell – psychologist
- Marie Breen Smyth – international relations scholar
- Bonnie Buchanan – professor in sustainable fintech
- Greville G Corbett - distinguished professor of linguistics
- Nigel Gilbert – sociologist, pioneer in the use of agent-based models in the social sciences
- Tim Jackson – ecological economist; professor of sustainable development; author of Prosperity Without Growth
- Diane Watt — medievalist
- Roberta Guerrina – political scientist
- Lionel Haward — father of British forensic psychology

== Health and Medical Sciences ==
- Derk-Jan Dijk - Distinguished Professor of Sleep and Physiology, Director of Surrey Sleep Research Centre
- Jill Maben - Nurse academic and educator
- James Michael Lynch - Microbiologist

== See also ==
- List of University of Surrey alumni
