= Stag Hill, University of Surrey =

Stag Hill Campus
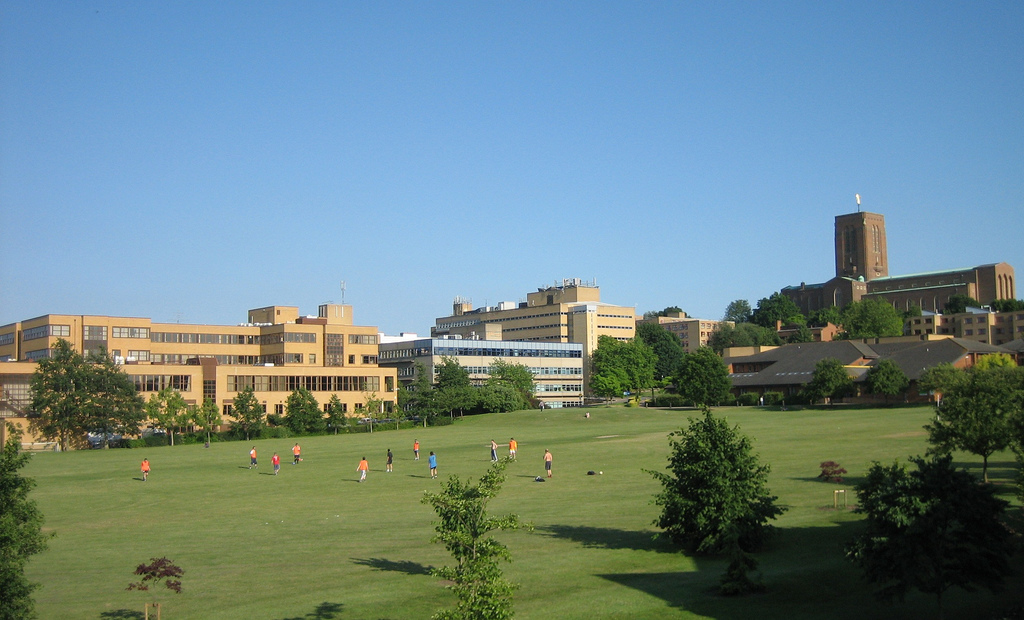
- Academic affiliations: University of Surrey
- Location: Guildford, England, UK; 51°14′34″N 00°35′24″W

The Stag Hill Campus is the main campus of the University of Surrey in the UK, and sits on its namesake geographic feature, Stag Hill, along with Guildford Cathedral – which is directly accessible from the campus by two hidden pathways. The campus is known for its multiple statues and complex tiered design.

The campus is approximately a 10-minute walk from the town centre.

== Buildings ==
The campus is home to many "landmark" buildings, some of which were the result of architectural competitions.

=== Academic ===
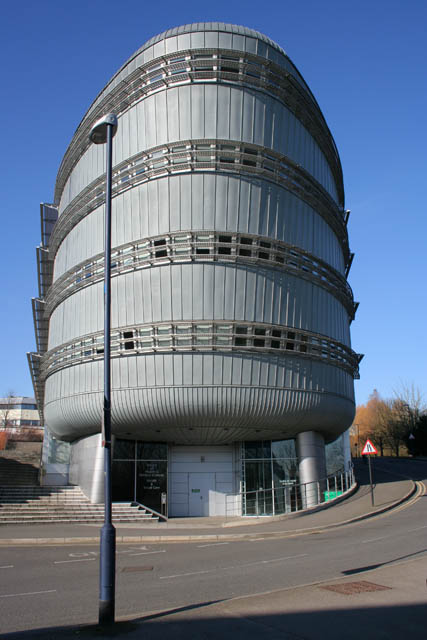
The Duke of Kent building

The academic buildings of the campus are all named for scholars, most of whom are associated with the university or the town of Guildford, like Lewis Carroll and Alan Turing. In the 1960s they were built as flexible "modules" or "shells" in order to be multi-purpose. The designers' visions were successful, as the interior of these buildings have been remodeled for different university needs. The design has also been attributed to utilitarian needs because of a lack of funding.

In 1997, the Austin Pearce building (named for former Pro-Chancellor Austin Pearce) opened at an open piazza on the campus. This building boasts four lecture theatres and an open atrium containing sculptures like a suspended acrobat, created by local artist. In 2003, the Rik Medlik building, adjacent to the Austin Pearce building, was built. It opened the following year, along with the exterior space connecting them. This building is one of the most environmentally-friendly and sustainable structures in the UK, and its design includes a roof sensor to adjust lighting needs and a cooling unit that takes energy from daily stored waste heat.

The Duke of Kent building, named for the university's Chancellor, Prince Edward, Duke of Kent, was opened in 1999 and named in 2000 as "one of the top 100 buildings in the world". The design includes a large curved side with many windows, allowing the atrium to have plenty of natural light; the building materials of the rest of the structure also bring in light. There is a connected podium area that provides an outside open space. The stairs between the main building and the piazza are on a straight line with both the Students' Union and the Cathedral. The building was used as the filming location for the ARC in the TV series Primeval because of its appearance as both futuristic and like a traditional ship.

=== Residential ===
The duplex Stag Hill rooms on the campus, designed by Maguire and Murray, were award-winning. The Millennium House building was designed by Sir Nicholas Grimshaw and partners, who also designed the Duke of Kent building, and is also known as "The Train" because of its shape and because the railway line runs behind it. Its design is in harmony with that of the Duke of Kent building, which it faces.

=== Other ===
Other campus buildings include Senate House, which features a distinct clockface that was given to the university by Charterhouse School, and the Multifaith Centre, which has places of worship for many world religions and was built in 2007. There is an on-campus nightclub called Rubix, which is popular among students (according to journalists from university magazine The Stag when interviewed by other publications). The nightclub has three bars and a layout that keeps clubgoers spread out, and has regular club nights on Wednesday and Friday, having hosted music acts from Stormzy to David Bowie to Led Zeppelin.

The Students' Union on the campus is in Union House, a Brutalist landmark designed by Maguire and Murray in 1972. However, in 2017 it was described as "life expired". In 2016, the architecture firm HLM was hired to refurbish the Union House, but in 2017 a closed competition was opened by the university for proposals from selected firms (including HLM) to design a new £10–12 million building for the union to be housed in. At the time, Union House contained multiple important student life facilities, like bars and lounges, as well as the students' union. It is home to the nightclub Rubix. The HLM refurbishment would have expanded and redesigned three floors of the existing building. The new proposal is planned for completion in 2020, with extensive spaces including the campus' largest lecture theatre, a multi-purpose performance venue, radio and TV stations for campus societies Stag Radio and StagTV, and a cinema.

A university research building is the 5G Innovation building, the centre for all global development of 5th generation mobile networks. Another is the Surrey Space Centre, partnered with NASA.

Also located on the campus are the studios for BBC Surrey and the regional office of the national academic examining body, AQA.

Former buildings on the campus include "Channies" and "Amigos". "Amigos" is a former name of the campus grocery shop, and "Channies" is the nickname of now-closed Chancellor's Bar.

== Statues and art ==
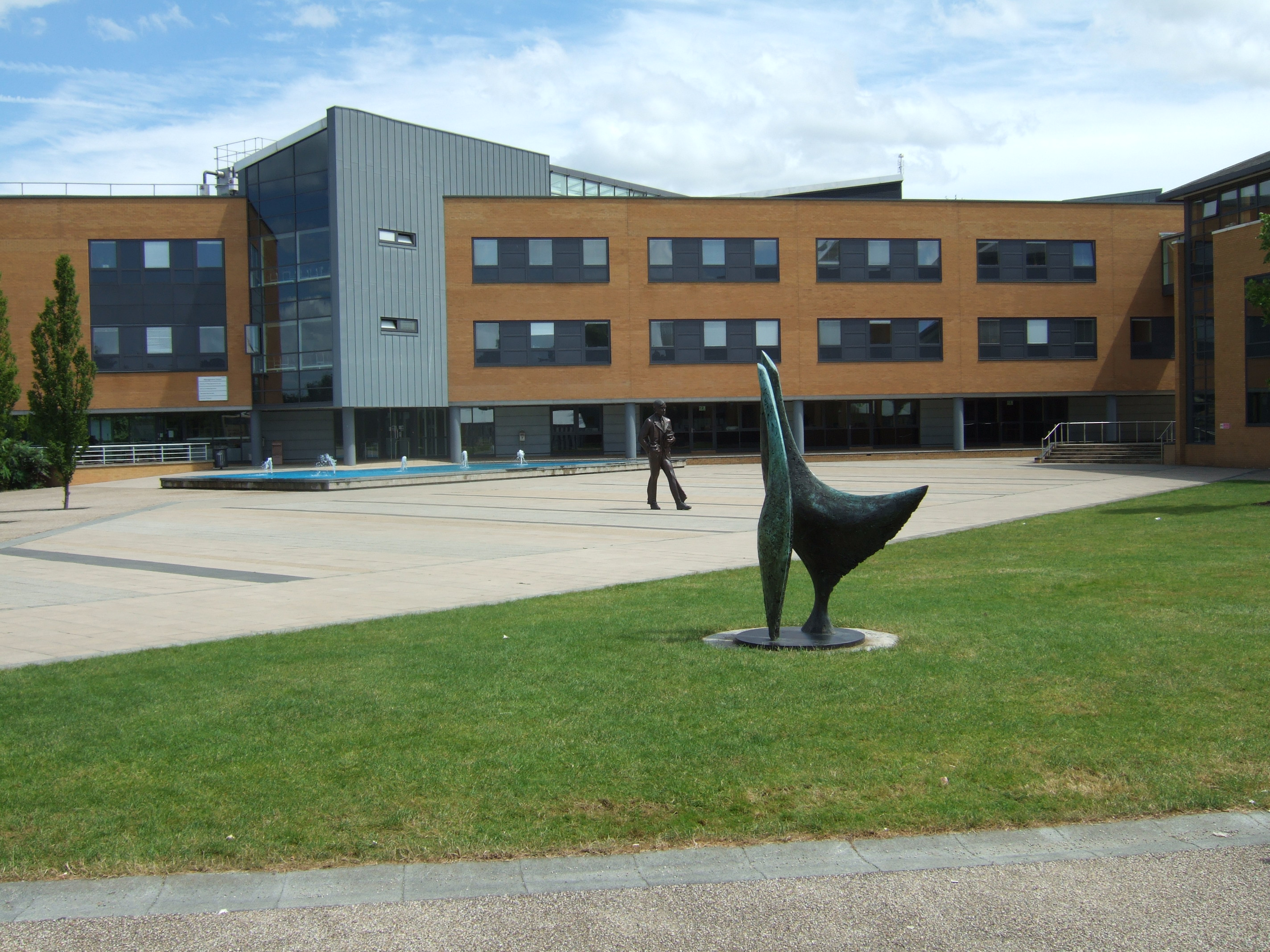
The open piazza, with the Rik Medlik building behind

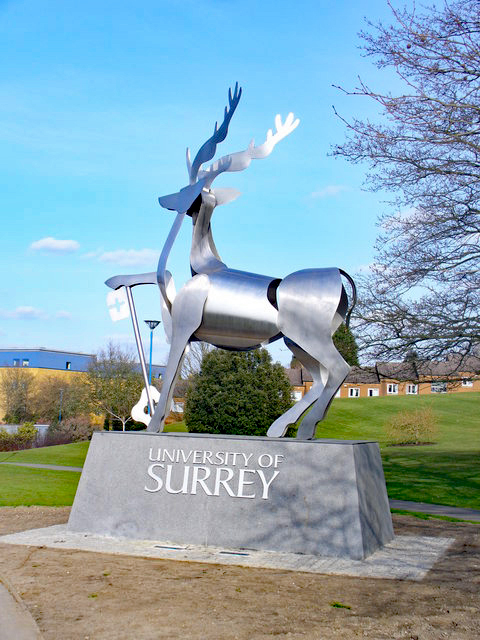
The Surrey Stag

The campus has many statues and murals. On the open piazza there are many artistic features, including an oversized statue of Alan Turing, an embedded fountain, and Knife Birds, an African-inspired piece. This piazza was unveiled in 2004.

Statues by the university lake include All The Gang Are Here, a statue of three wolves that is in a wooded area by the campus' perimeter road, the Geodesic Dome, a globe presented to the university in 1982 when the Space Structures Conference was held there, and pieces of modern art, like the Spine and Narcissus; Narcissus is on loan to the university by artist William Pye.

The campus also has eye-catching fish statues. The university says that their aim "is to raise a smile" from people. The statues were designed and built by Daren Greenhow, made of mechanical parts. At least one of these was designed, according to the artist, based on the phrase "A woman needs a man like a fish needs a bicycle" – it does give a fish a bicycle. Another fish is on a unicycle and juggling, a balancing act representing a busy life. The third is on a tricycle. The fish were commissioned because of the university's contributions to water research.

There is a 5-metre (16 ft) high stainless steel sculpture of a stag on top of a stand at the main entrance to the campus. Designed by sculptor Allan Sly and named The Surrey Stag, it is illuminated at night so that it is always visible. Because of its size, the antlers had to be removed for transport to the site. The metalworkers also pre-tested its strength to ensure it could support students climbing and posing on it. It was unveiled in 2009 by Prince Edward, Duke of Kent. It is a tradition at the university to take a photo at the Stag upon graduation or dissertation submission in final year.

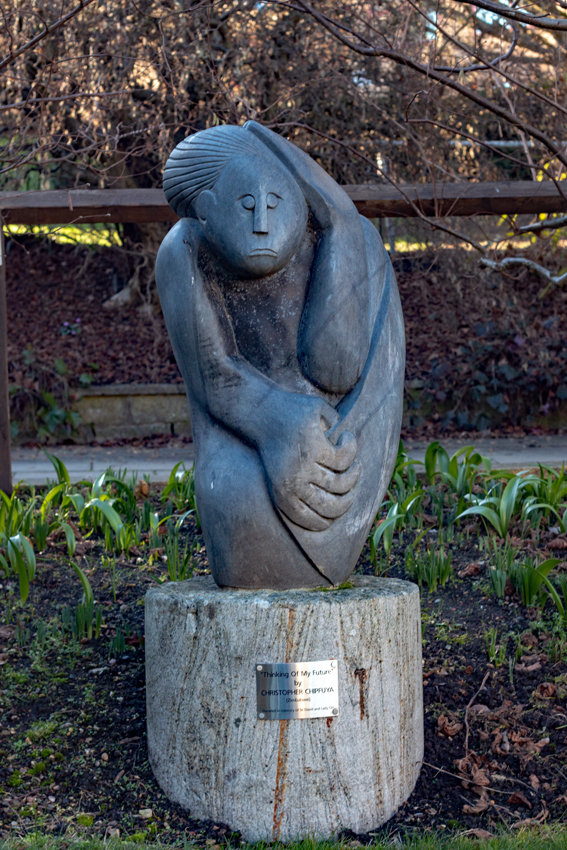
Thinking of my future by Christopher Chipfuya

At the campus amphitheatre is a sculpture called Thinking of My Future, unveiled in 2010. This sculpture depicts a person looking worried, with one hand scratching their head and the other tightly grasping their leg. There are two separate but connecting walkways from the amphitheatre to the library piazza that pass a mural on the side of the Lecture Theatre building, this was built in 1980 on three aluminium panels by Duncan Newton, and was commissioned by the university's Arts Council.

A mural of a tree made of ceramics outside the Students' Union was created by students at the Roehampton Institute of Art, which was connected with the university at the time.

There are covered walkways also connecting several academic buildings. These walkways feature artwork that is coloured circles, which are illuminated by lights at night. Initially this was an art project in 1996, both for the dots on the walkways and for artistic impressions to be made of the result, and they were meant to be taken down shortly afterwards, but they still remain.

== Natural spaces ==
The campus has a collection of notable and rare trees, with maps and pamphlets of these available around Guildford. These are spread and regularly planted across the campus. Also on the campus is a lake with a grass area, where social events are held, like the Summer of Cinema in 2018, where films were played throughout the summer for free. The campus supports its natural spaces with eco-friendly initiatives, and in 2018 secured £100,000 in order to fund a bike-sharing scheme for students.

== See also ==
List of public art in Surrey
