= Steve Jarvis (disambiguation) =

Steve Jarvis (born 1968) is a member of the North Carolina House of Representatives.

Steve Jarvis may also refer to:

- Steve Jarvis Park, ground of Salisbury United Football Club
- Steve Jarvis, character in Action in the North Atlantic
- Stephen A. Jarvis, a UK Computer Scientist and academic
