= Walter Eric Spear =

German physicist

Professor Walter Spear FRS FRSE FInstP
- Born: Walter Eric Spear; 20 January 1921; Frankfurt am Main, Germany
- Died: 21 February 2008 (aged 87); Dundee, Scotland
- Education: Regent Street Polytechnic; Birkbeck College London
- Spouse: Hilda D. King
- Children: 2
- Awards: FRS; FRSE; Europhysics Prize (1976); Max Born Prize (1977); Makdougal-Brisbane Prize (1980); Rank Prize (1988); Bakerian Lecture (1988); Rumford Medal (1990)
- Scientific career
- Fields: Physics
- Workplaces: University College, Leicester; University of Dundee
- Doctoral students: Alf Adams
- Website: www.dundee.ac.uk/pressreleases/2008/prmarch08/spear.html

Walter Eric Spear (20 January 1921 – 21 February 2008) was a German physicist whose work helped develop large area electronics and thin film displays. He was born in Frankfurt to a Jewish father and a Lutheran mother; by the time he finished his school examinations in 1938, life for Jews and people associated with Jews was becoming difficult. With the support of friends and relatives in Britain, the family moved to London where he arrived in 1938 "with a small suitcase and a large cello".

== Education ==
Wanting to pursue a scientific career, Spear attended evening classes for the University of London entrance examination, which he passed before the family were interned on the Isle of Man as suspected Axis sympathisers. They were soon released, and Spear joined the Royal Pioneer Corps in 1940, later moving to the Royal Artillery where he became a Bombardier before being demobilized in 1946.

== Career ==
Spear graduated in 1950 and obtained a Research Fellowship that allowed him to stay there to do additional work. He left Birkbeck in 1953 to take up a position at University College, Leicester, where he did research on amorphous selenium films.

One of his PhD students at Leicester was Alf Adams, the British physicist who invented the strained-layer quantum-well laser. Spear left Leicester in 1968 after being offered the Harris Chair of Physics at the University of Dundee.

It was while working at Leicester that Spear first came into contact with a student named Peter LeComber, with whom he would work closely throughout his career. LeComber went with Spear to Dundee, and together they became known for their joint research into the properties of amorphous silicon.

The work carried out by Spear and LeComber and their research team in this field led to the creation of the amorphous film silicon transistor, which led to LCD technology and to the eventual development of technologies such as flat screen TVs and solar panels. While at Dundee they also established the Amorphous Materials Research Group, which was devoted to the study of non-crystalline solids.

When Spear retired in 1988, he was succeeded in the Harris Chair by LeComber, who died in 1992.

== Awards and honours ==
In 1972 Spear was made a Fellow of the Royal Society of Edinburgh, in 1976 he was awarded the Europhysics Prize, and in 1977 the Max Born Medal by the Institute of Physics. In 1980 he was elected a Fellow of the Royal Society of London and awarded the Makdougall Brisbane Prize of the Royal Society of Edinburgh. In 1988 he was awarded the Rank Prize, and the same year presented the Royal Society Bakerian Lecture. In 1990 he was awarded their Rumford Medal, and he retired soon afterwards. His nomination for the Royal Society reads

Professor Spear is distinguished for his experimental research over a period of nearly two decades on electronic transport in condensed matter, particularly measurements of the drift mobility. His work was the first to establish an activated mobility of polaron type in a molecular crystal (sulphur), and a mobility edge in a non-crystalline material (glow discharge deposited silicon). He has determined the density of states in the gap in this material by field effect measurements and their role in photoconductivity, and has recently shown that, contrary to previous ideas, it can be doped. His work is characterised by high experimental skill, felicitous choice of materials and full theoretical understanding.

Spear's archives are held by Archive Services, University of Dundee. As well as including academic works by Spear and notes for talks and lectures, they include Spear's ‘Scientific Curiosities and Absurdities’ file which features some of the more unusual correspondence Spear received.

== Personal ==
Spear's mother was a professional violinist and teacher. Spear inherited a 17h century Italian cello while a boy and received cello lessons from the age of 8. He was an amateur cellist throughout his life. His father, David Spear, was a graphic artist who later became a photographer.

Spear was survived by his widow, born Hilda D. King, whom he had married in Middlesex in 1952, by the couple's two daughters and their children.
