= SETsquared =

UK business incubation network

Map of Southern England showing the SETsquared centres: university other

The SETsquared Partnership, usually known simply as SETsquared, is a business incubation network run by five universities in Southern England. SETsquared stands for Southern England Technology Triangle. The partnership was formed in 2002, between the University of Bath, the University of Bristol, the University of Southampton and the University of Surrey. The University of Exeter joined the partnership in 2011. Cardiff University joined the partnership in 2021, making it the first institution in Wales to do so.

In addition to hosting and supporting startup companies, SETsquared promotes university-to-business technology transfer and guides students into entrepreneurship. It has been mainly financed by the Higher Education Funding Council for England's Higher Education Innovation Fund and by membership fees for businesses.

In 2015, it was ranked as the top university-based business incubator in the world by UBI Global, as well as being ranked by UBI Global as the top one in Europe for the third year running. By 2016, the network had assisted over 1,000 startups.

SETsquared's executive director is Rosie Bennett, who has been fulfilling the role in an interim capacity since February 2026.

== Centres ==
At Bath, SETsquared are based in the University of Bath Innovation Centre in Carpenter House.

Bristol's centre, launched in 2003, was located adjacent to the university's Department of Computer Science. In 2013, the centre moved into the Engine Shed business incubator, housed in Isambard Kingdom Brunel's building at Bristol Temple Meads railway station, within Bristol Temple Quarter Enterprise Zone. An Engine Shed 2 is planned.

The Exeter centre is based at the University of Exeter Innovation Centre and, since 2015, also at the Exeter Science Park.

Southampton's centre is at the Southampton Science Park.

In Surrey, SETsquared is based in the Surrey Technology Centre within Surrey Research Park, Guildford.

In December 2014, SETsquared opened another centre, in the Basing View business park in Basingstoke, Hampshire, assisted by a grant of £100,000 from Basingstoke and Deane Borough Council.
