= University Global Partnership Network =

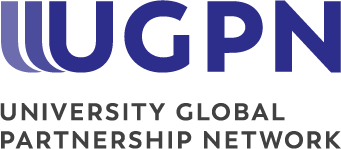
- Type: Education and research
- Region served: Global
- Website: www.ugpn.org

The University Global Partnership Network (UGPN) is an international network of universities, established as a "foundation for international collaboration enabling academics and students from some of the world’s top universities to work together on issues of global importance".

The mission of UGPN is "to develop sustainable world-class research, education and knowledge transfer through an active international network of selected Universities collaborating in research, learning and teaching to benefit global society".

== UGPN Member Institutions ==
UGPN currently has 4 member universities in four countries.

=== Australia ===
- University of Wollongong

=== Brazil ===
- University of São Paulo

=== United Kingdom ===
- University of Surrey

=== United States ===
- North Carolina State University

=== Additional Partnership Relationships ===
- Banco Santander
- Fapesp (the São Paulo State Research Funding Council)
