= Surrey Research Park =

Research park in Guildford, Surrey

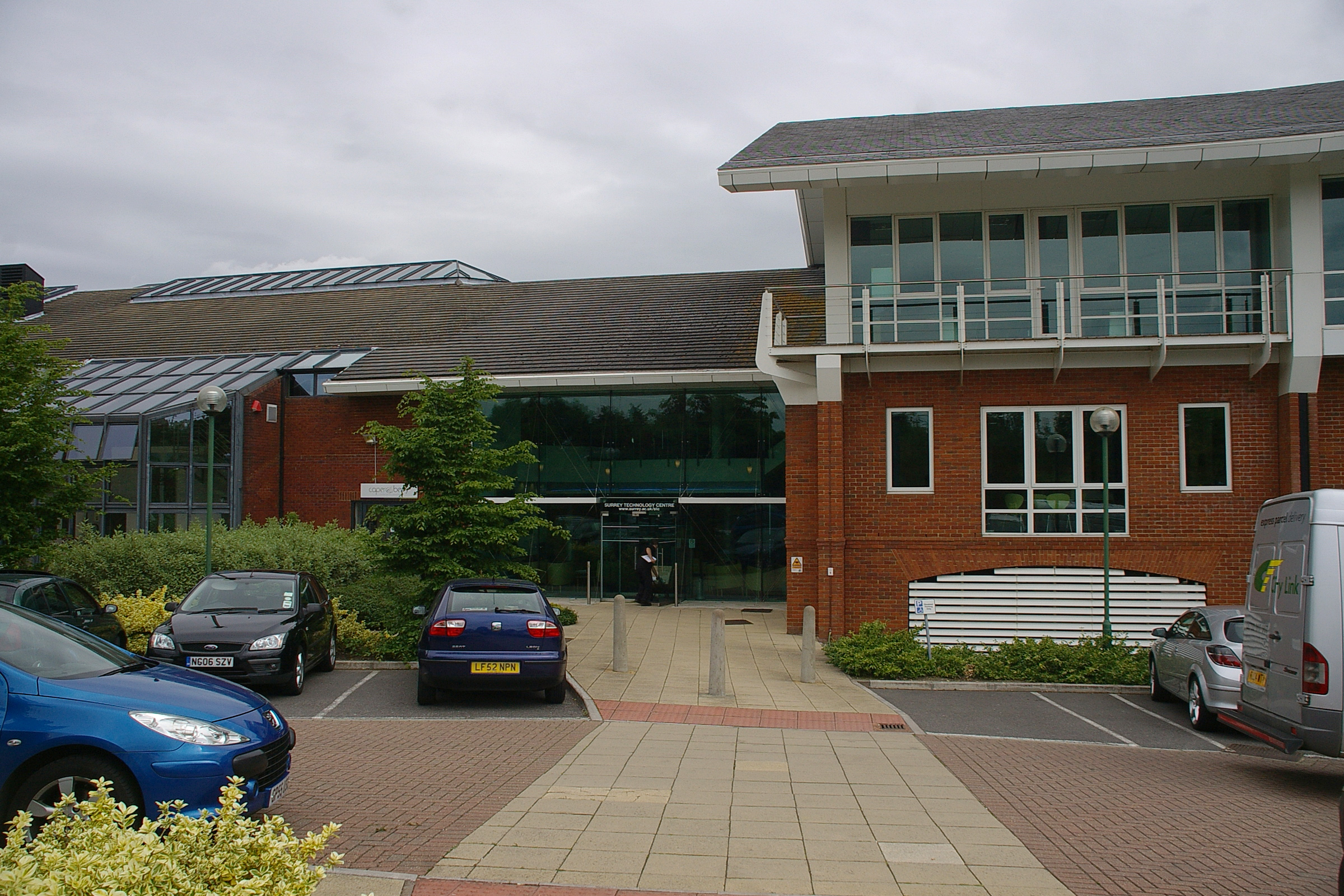
- Surrey Technology Centre building

- Research Park in Surrey
- Location: 40 Occam Road Guildford; Surrey GU2 7YG
- Coordinates: 51°14′21″N 0°36′47″W
- Opening date: 1985
- Owner: University of Surrey
- No. of tenants: 175
- No. of workers: 4,500
- Size: 28 ha (69 acres)
- Parking: Dedicated parking
- Website: http://www.surrey-research-park.com

The Surrey Research Park is a large research park in Guildford, Surrey. The Surrey Research Park has been planned, developed, funded and managed by the University of Surrey which operates the park as a wholly owned University Enterprise Unit.

== Objectives ==
The Park was first established in 1981 to meet five objectives which remain guiding principles for the site. These support the three stakeholders in the site. The objectives for the university include: to develop some independent income for the University of Surrey, raising the profile of the University of Surrey as a centre for scholarship and innovation and supporting technology and knowledge transfer to tenants. The objective set by the Park for tenant companies is to give them a competitive advantage through sharing the risks of starting a company and gaining access to technology, talent and property tenure arrangements that give the businesses flexibility to match their needs as they grow.

To meet these objectives the Park pioneered business incubation in the Surrey Technology Centre, the first building to be opened on the site in 1984, offers 7,400 m^{2} (80,000 sq ft) of space to start ups and today continues to offer this service with the additional activities of Surrey SETsquared that occupies 240 m^{2} (2,600 sq ft) SETsquared is a partnership between the Universities of Bristol, Bath, Exeter, Southampton and Surrey. It is a not-for-profit Government subsidised organisation providing bespoke business support for high-tech and/or high potential start-up ventures.

Today the Surrey Technology Centre is one of 31 buildings on the site, which collectively provide some 70,000 m^{2} (750,000 sq ft) of space to science, engineering, technology and social science based businesses. These companies include those involved in the computer games, space centered commercial enterprises, bio-medicine, cybersecurity, electronics, chemical engineering, and veterinary medicine as examples. The park operates with around 175 companies on site at any one time, employing some 4,500 staff. It is responsible for some £500m of economic activity each year and is a major financial asset for the university as well as creating a culture of innovation in the region.

== Businesses ==
The Park hosts over 140 companies and organisations with offices in the Research Park including:

- 22cans
- BAE Systems Applied Intelligence Ltd
- BOC Linde
- Cressive DX
- Surrey Satellite Technology Limited
- The Whiteley Clinic

== Geography ==
The Park comprises a landscaped area of approximately 70 acres (28 ha) and includes two lakes. It is situated about 1 kilometre (0.62 mi) from the A3 between Surrey University's Manor Park campus and student village, and the Royal Surrey County Hospital.

== History ==
The idea was first promoted in 1979 and it was included in Surrey County Council's development plan in 1981. The total cost of the research park was £35 million (1986 prices) and the promoters aimed to create around 500 new jobs. The first building to be completed was the £1 million Grand Metropolitan Innovation Centre. The first tenants began moving into the park in late 1985, and the Duke of Kent formally opened Surrey Research Park on 30 April 1986.

By 1989 the Research Park hosted sixty-five companies in business. By March 2015, 90% of the Park had been developed with just two remaining sites, known as George Stephenson Place and Faraday Court, undeveloped. There are currently 140 companies and organisations on the Park.
