= Peter LeComber =

British physicist and academic (1941–1992)

Peter George LeComber (or Le Comber) FRS FRSE (19 February 1941 – 9 September 1992) was a British solid-state physicist and academic. With ten patents to his name, he is in part responsible for the development of items such as flat-screen televisions and solar power cells. He worked closely with Walter Eric Spear FRS in the development of Amorphous silicon and the creation of solar panels.

== Life ==
He was born in Ilford on 19 February 1941. His father was largely absent during his early years, serving in the Middle East during the Second World War. He attended Becontree Heath Primary School. Following a scholarship at age eleven, he studied at South East Essex Technical College and then Leicester University, graduating BSc in 1962 and then undertaking a Ph.D. From 1965 to 1967, he conducted studies at Purdue University in Indiana, USA. In 1967 he returned to Leicester University as a lecturer in physics.

He met Walter Eric Spear whilst working in Leicester and together they went to the Carnegie Laboratory of Physics, Dundee University in 1969 to establish the study of non-crystalline solids. In 1984 he was the recipient of the Duddell Medal. In 1984, he was elected a Fellow of the Royal Society of Edinburgh and in 1992, shortly before his death, he was elected a Fellow of the Royal Society of London.

In 1986, Dundee University created a personal chair in Solid State Physics for him, placing the university in a critical position in the development of semiconductors.

He died of a heart attack on 9 September 1992, aged 51, whilst on a trip to Switzerland to celebrate his thirtieth wedding anniversary. As a close personal friend, Spear wrote his obituary. Spear's own research career was effectively ended by LeComber's sudden death.

== Family ==
He married Joy Smith around 1963.
