= Stephen A. Jarvis =

British computer scientist and professor

Professor Stephen A. Jarvis FBCS

President and Vice-Chancellor University of Surrey
- Incumbent
- Assumed office September 2025
- Preceded by: Max Lu

Provost and Vice-Principal University of Birmingham
- In office February 2023 – September 2025
- Preceded by: Tim Jones

Pro-Vice-Chancellor and Head of College of Engineering and Physical Sciences University of Birmingham
- In office June 2020 – January 2023
- Preceded by: Andrew John Schofield
- Scientific career
- Education: University of London; University of Oxford; University of Durham
- Fields: Computational Science
- Workplaces: University of Birmingham; University of Warwick; University of Oxford

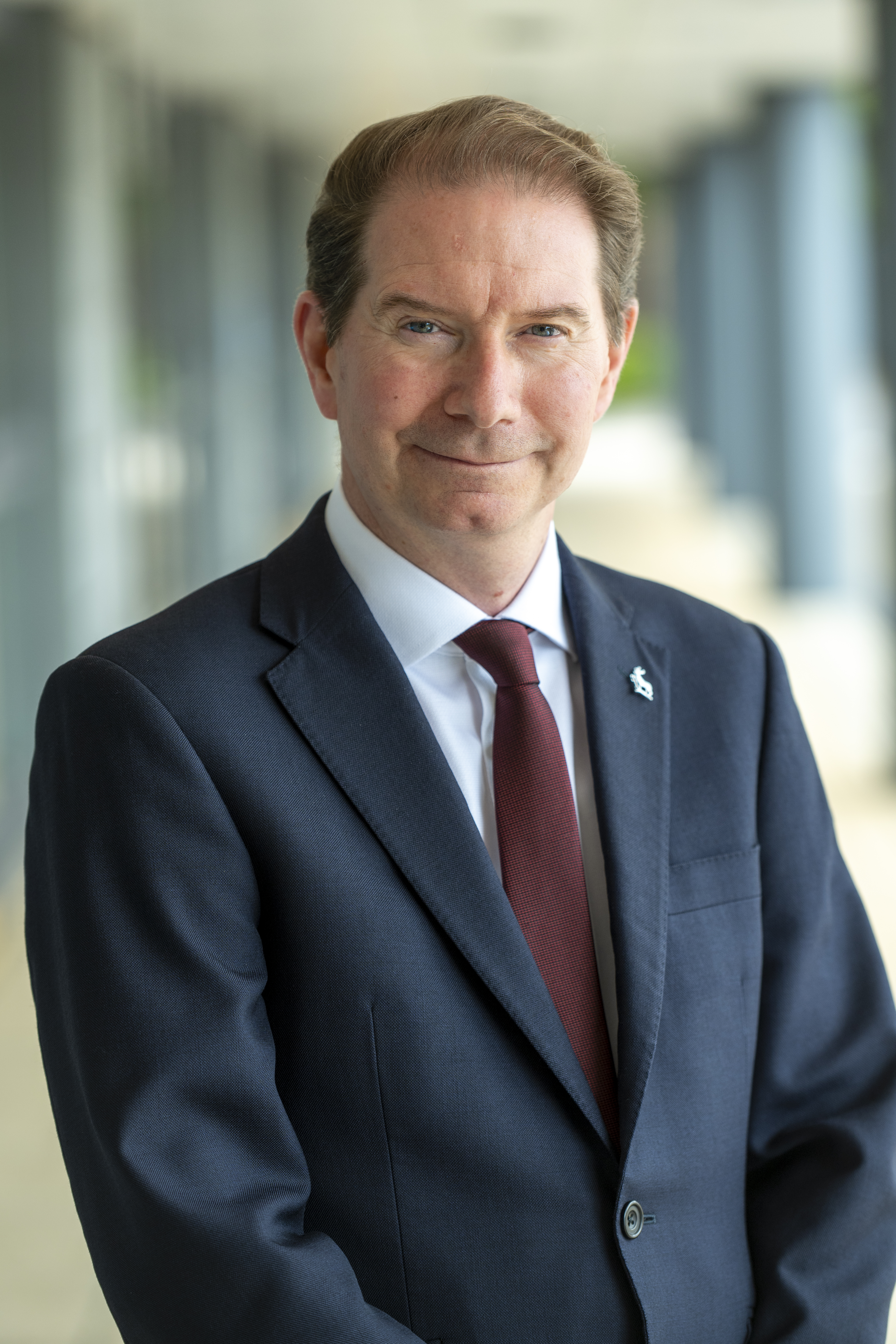
Professor Stephen Jarvis at the University of Surrey in 2025

Stephen A. Jarvis is a British computer scientist and academic administrator. He is currently President and Vice-Chancellor at the University of Surrey. Prior to this he served as Pro-Vice-Chancellor and Head of the College of Engineering and Physical Sciences, and more recently Provost and Vice-Principal, at the University of Birmingham.

Before joining the University of Birmingham he was Deputy Pro-Vice-Chancellor (Research) at the University of Warwick, where he led industry-academic partnerships in the area of big data and established an international scholarship programme in AI. He also supported the establishment of The Alan Turing Institute, the United Kingdom's national institute for data science and artificial intelligence, where he served as a non-executive director and trustee between 2018 and 2020.

He studied at London, Oxford and Durham Universities before taking his first Lectureship at the University of Oxford Computing Laboratory. In 2009 he was awarded a four-year Royal Society Industry Fellowship with Rolls-Royce. He continues to support the development of Rolls-Royce's standard aerodynamic design tool, which underpins the way that Rolls-Royce now designs and builds its turbo-fan engines. This research recently won the award for the Best Scientific Visualization at the 2022 Supercomputing (SC) Conference, the premier international conference on supercomputing attended by over 10,000 delegates annually.

He became the Director of the EPSRC Centre for Doctoral Training in Urban Science in 2014 and co-led the founding of the Center for Urban Science and Progress (CUSP) in New York and London. In 2020 he oversaw the trials of the UK's first hydrogen-powered train and research and development programmes with High Speed 2 (HS2). He has served as non-executive Director at the Manufacturing Technology Centre (MTC), established in 2010 to bridge the gap between academia and industry and which represents one of the largest public sector investments in UK manufacturing and is currently a non-executive Director at the National Physical Laboratory (NPL), the national measurement standards laboratory of the United Kingdom that sets and maintains physical standards for British industry.
