= University of Surrey =

Public university in Guildford, England

Coordinates: 51°14′35″N 0°35′22″W

- Coat of arms of the University of Surrey
- Former names: Battersea Polytechnic Institute (1891–1956); Battersea College of Technology (1956–1966)
- Type: Public research university
- Established: 1966; 60 years ago (gained university status)
- Academic affiliations: ACU; CESAER; EUA; SETsquared; UGPN; Universities UK; Defence Universities Alliance
- Endowment: £6.86 million (2025)
- Budget: £346.4 million (2024/25)
- Chancellor: The Duke of Kent
- Vice-Chancellor: Professor Stephen A. Jarvis
- Academic staff: 1,550 (2024/25)
- Administrative staff: 1,515 (2024/25)
- Students: 16,430 (2024/25); 15,195 FTE (2024/25)
- Undergraduates: 12,500 (2024/25)
- Postgraduates: 3,930 (2024/25)
- Location: Guildford, Surrey, England
- Campus: Campus, multiple sites
- Colours: Blue and gold
- Nickname: Team Surrey
- Website: surrey.ac.uk
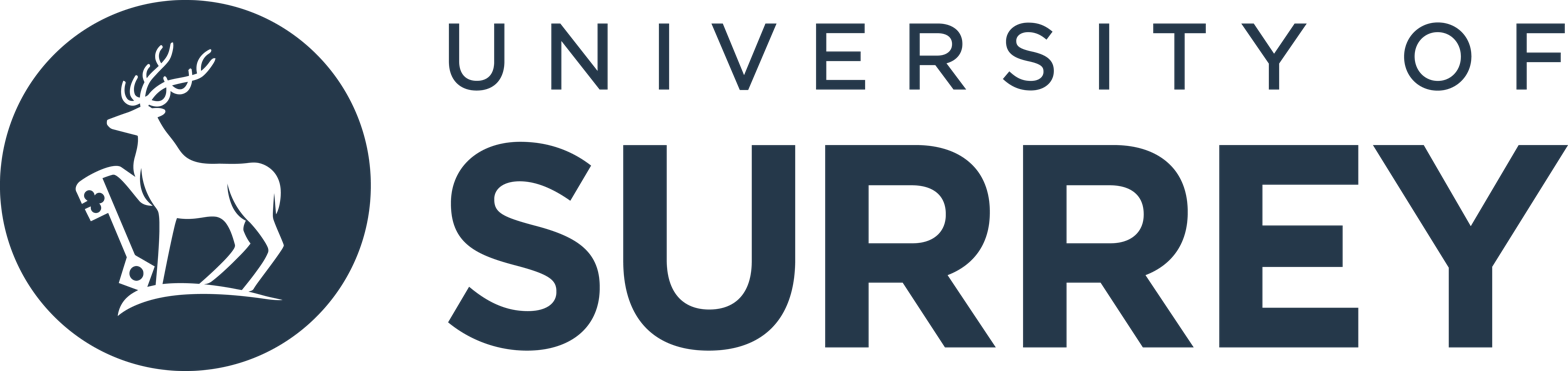

The University of Surrey is a public research university in Guildford, Surrey, England. The university received its royal charter in 1966, along with a number of other institutions following recommendations in the Robbins Report. The institution was previously known as Battersea College of Technology and was in Battersea Park, London. Its roots however, go back to Battersea Polytechnic Institute, founded in 1891 to provide further and higher education in London, including its poorer inhabitants.

The university is a member of the Association of MBAs and is one of four universities in the University Global Partnership Network. It is also part of the SETsquared partnership along with the University of Bath, the University of Bristol, the University of Southampton, and the University of Exeter. The university's main campus is on Stag Hill, close to the centre of Guildford and adjacent to Guildford Cathedral. Surrey Sports Park is situated at the nearby Manor Park, the university's secondary campus. Among British universities, the University of Surrey had the 41st highest average UCAS Tariff for new entrants in 2020.

The university holds a number of formal links with institutions worldwide, including the Surrey International Institute, launched in partnership with the Dongbei University of Finance and Economics. The university owns the Surrey Research Park, providing facilities for over 110 companies engaged in research. Surrey has been awarded three Queen's Anniversary Prizes for its research, with the 2021 Research Excellence Framework seeing the university rise 12 places to 33rd in the UK for overall research quality and 41% of the university's research outputs classified as "world leading". It was named The Sunday Times University of the Year in 2016, was nominated again for the same accolade in 2023, and was The Sunday Times University of the Year for Graduate Employment in 2022.

The chancellor of the university is Prince Edward, Duke of Kent. Current and emeritus academics at the university include ten Fellows of the Royal Society, twenty-one Fellows of the Royal Academy of Engineering, one Fellow of the British Academy and six Fellows of the Academy of Social Sciences. Surrey has educated many notable alumni, including Olympic gold medallists, several senior politicians, as well as a number of notable persons in various fields including the arts, sports and academia. Graduates typically abbreviate the University of Surrey to Sur when using post-nominal letters after their degree.

== History ==
=== Foundation and early period ===
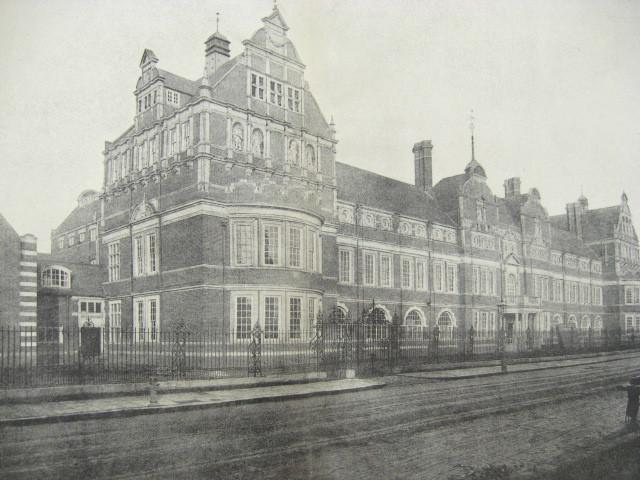
The university's original Battersea campus, including its Great Hall

The University of Surrey was preceded by the Battersea Polytechnic Institute which was founded in 1891 and admitted its first students in 1894. Its aim was to provide greater access to further and higher education for Londoners, including some of the city's "poorer inhabitants". In 1901, evening classes provided instruction in subjects such as Mechanical Engineering and Building, Electrical Engineering, Chemical and other trades, Physics and Natural Science, Maths, Languages, Commercial subjects, Music and special classes for women including Domestic Economy subjects. Day classes consisted of Art, Science, Women's Subjects and Gymnastics, and classes were also offered in preparation for university and professional examinations. The institute focused on science and technology subjects, and from about 1920 taught University of London students, awarding University of London external degrees.

In the early 1950s the Polish University College, an institute set up by the Polish government in exile, amalgamated with the Battersea Polytechnic Institute.

In 1956, the institute was among the first to receive the designation "College of Advanced Technology" and was renamed Battersea College of Technology. By the beginning of the sixties, the college had virtually outgrown its building in Battersea and had decided to move to Guildford. In addition to this, the Robbins Report of 1963 proposed that the Colleges of Advanced Technology, including Battersea, should expand and become degree-awarding universities. In 1965, the university-designate acquired a greenfield site in Guildford from Guildford Cathedral, Guildford Borough Council and the Onslow Village Trust.

=== Construction ===
The site was first announced on 12 March 1964, to have 3,500 full-time students by 1975. Guildford Borough Council supported the proposal on 31 March 1964.

A complete model was built by December 1964 of the 83-acre site. The £4m contract was given to James Longley of Crawley in March 1965, for phase one, of three four-storey academic blocks, seven five-storey residential blocks, the nine-storey Senate House, lecture theatres and restaurant. It was built in only ten months.

The architect was the Building Design Partnership (George Grenfell-Baines). Government planning permission was given on 30 December 1965.

In May 1968, James Longley of Crawley were given the £1.75m contract for phase two, with two academic blocks, six residential blocks, a hall, and a restaurant. It was built with the Bison industrialised building system.

=== University status ===
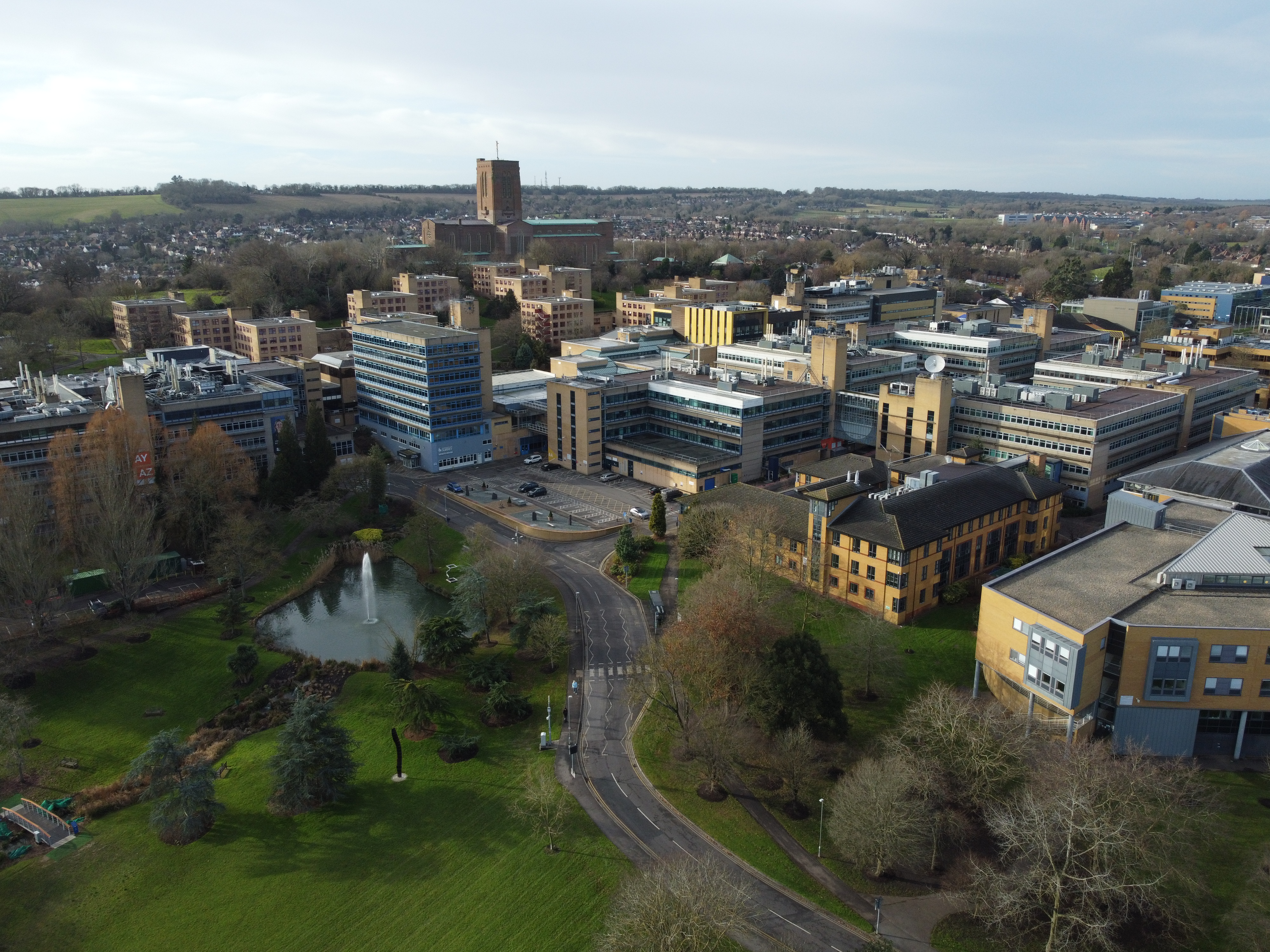
Stag Hill campus

On 9 September 1966 the University of Surrey was established by royal charter. In 1967, on the day before the installation ceremony of the first Chancellor of the university, the Aberfan disaster occurred. Alfred Robens, Baron Robens of Woldingham who was appointed the first Chancellor, was also the chairman of the National Coal Board, and as such was expected to visit the site of the disaster. Controversially, in a decision parodied by Private Eye, Robens continued with the ceremony in Guildford to become Chancellor. During this transition period, visitors to the Battersea campus on 25 October 1968 saw Led Zeppelin perform their very first gig, advertised as being at the university's Victorian Great Hall, on Battersea Park Road. By 1970 the move from Battersea to Guildford was complete.

The university's Battersea Court consists of halls of residence which were named in honour of the university's Battersea origins.

Between 1982 and 2008, the university became the trustee of the building of the Guildford Institute, using parts of the building for its adult education programme and providing a university presence in the heart of Guildford. The Assessment and Qualifications Alliance (formerly Associated Examining Board) moved from Aldershot to its own headquarters building on the Stag Hill campus in 1985. The university marked its Silver Jubilee in 1991, an event celebrated by the publishing of Surrey – The Rise of a Modern University by Roy Douglas and by a Service of Thanksgiving in Guildford Cathedral attended by HM The Queen in March 1992.

In 1998, due to the ongoing development in the relationship between the university and the nearby Roehampton Institute, it was decided to form an academic federation. In November 1999, the Privy Council approved the necessary changes to the university's Charter and Statutes and the Roehampton Institute became the University of Surrey Roehampton at the beginning of 2000. Between 2000 and 2004, the university and Roehampton worked together as the Federal University of Surrey. In June 2004, the Privy Council granted Roehampton an independent university title, and it became Roehampton University from 1 August 2004, ending the partnership between the institutions.

The university celebrated its 35th anniversary in May 2002 with a major event in Guildford Cathedral. It was also marked by the unveiling of The Surrey Scholar sculpture (by Allan Sly FBS) to mark the Golden Jubilee of Her Majesty The Queen and as a gift to the people of Guildford. The Surrey Scholar is at the bottom of Guildford High Street. Understanding the Real World, a visual history of the university, by Christopher Pick, was published to coincide with this anniversary. In 2007, the university saw a major increase in overall applications by 39% compared with the previous year. This was followed by a further increase in applications of 12% in 2008. In October 2008, the university lost out to Royal Holloway in a bid to merge with London medical institute St George's, University of London. From September 2009, the Guildford School of Acting became a subsidiary of the university and relocated from Guildford town centre to the university campus.

In March 2019 the university announced it would have to make £15m worth of cuts owing to the effects of Brexit and anticipated cuts in tuition fees, and was offering redundancy to all staff. Following the announcement, The Stag, published an article titled 'Paygate: The Problem with Surrey's Vice-Chancellor', in which it compared Vice-Chancellor Max Lu's "performance-related bonuses" to the university's actual performance. Soon after, in May 2019, staff and students held a no confidence vote against the university management, with coverage largely focused on Lu's leadership. Of all the unionised staff who voted, 96% gave a vote of no confidence in "the Vice-Chancellor and Executive Board". The all-staff vote was approved by all three trade unions represented at the university, in a meeting held with the largest member attendance seen. Concerns raised by staff specifically include "Lu's language which suggests staff are a cost rather than an asset", according to the University and College Union, while the Students' Union was specifically concerned about the closure of many arts courses at the university despite a "healthy" number of applications for them. Students who wanted a "no" vote hoped this result would make the university management "engage with staff and students and discuss changes".

== Buildings and sites ==
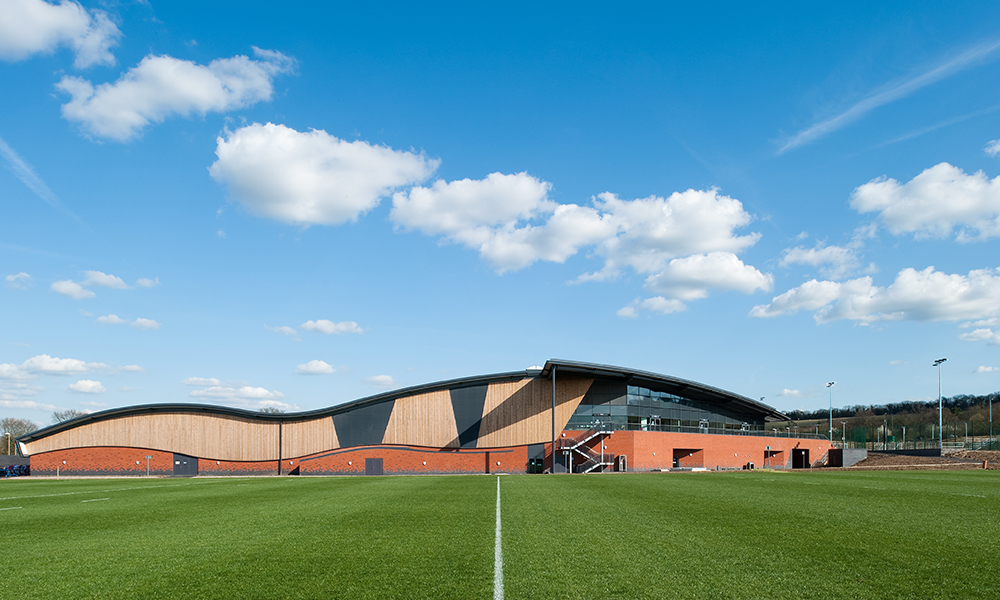
Surrey Sports Park, opened in 2010 to replace the former university sport facilities.

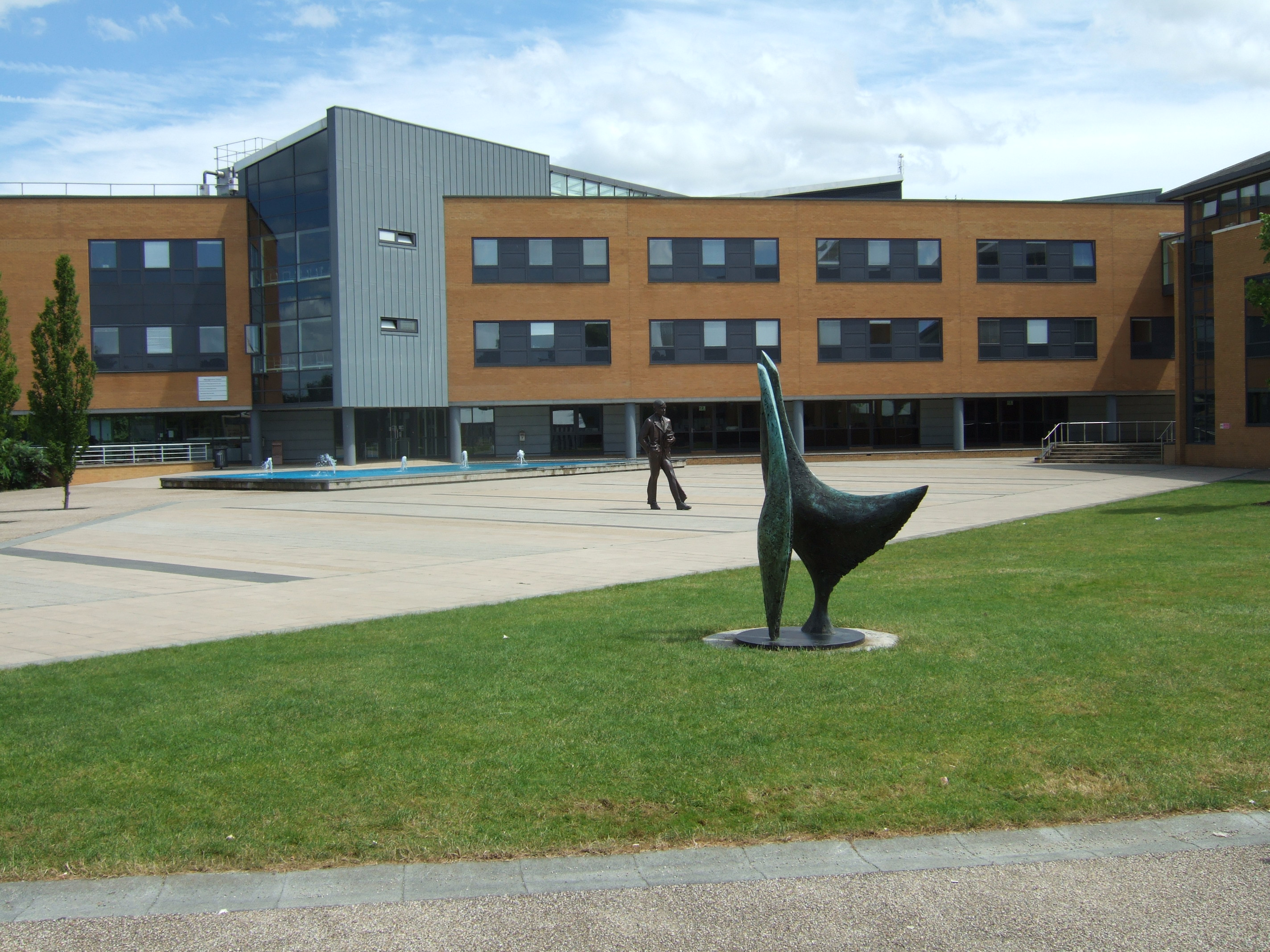
The School of Management Building with the statue of Alan Turing in the middle distance.

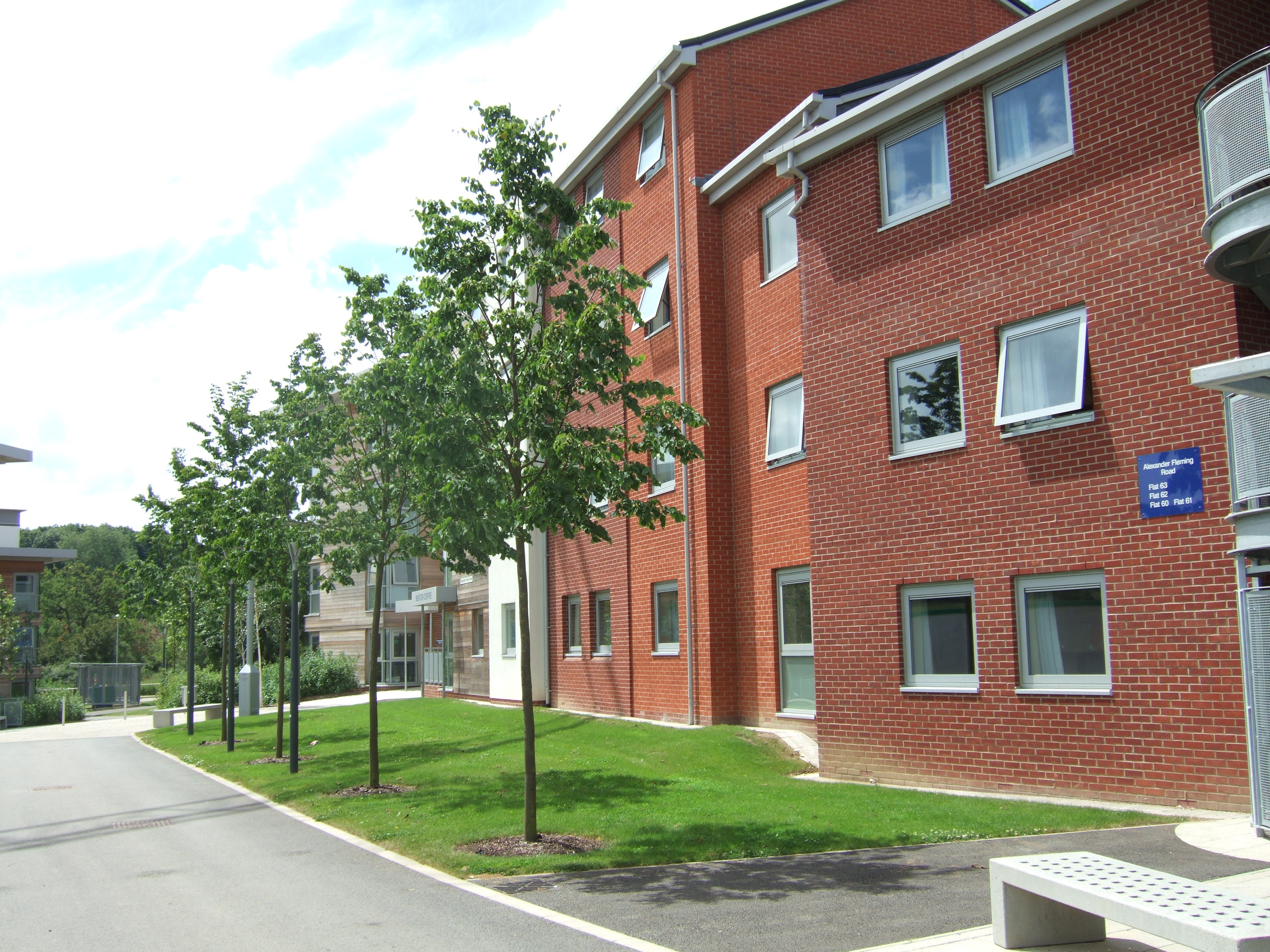
Student accommodation has been developed at Manor Park.

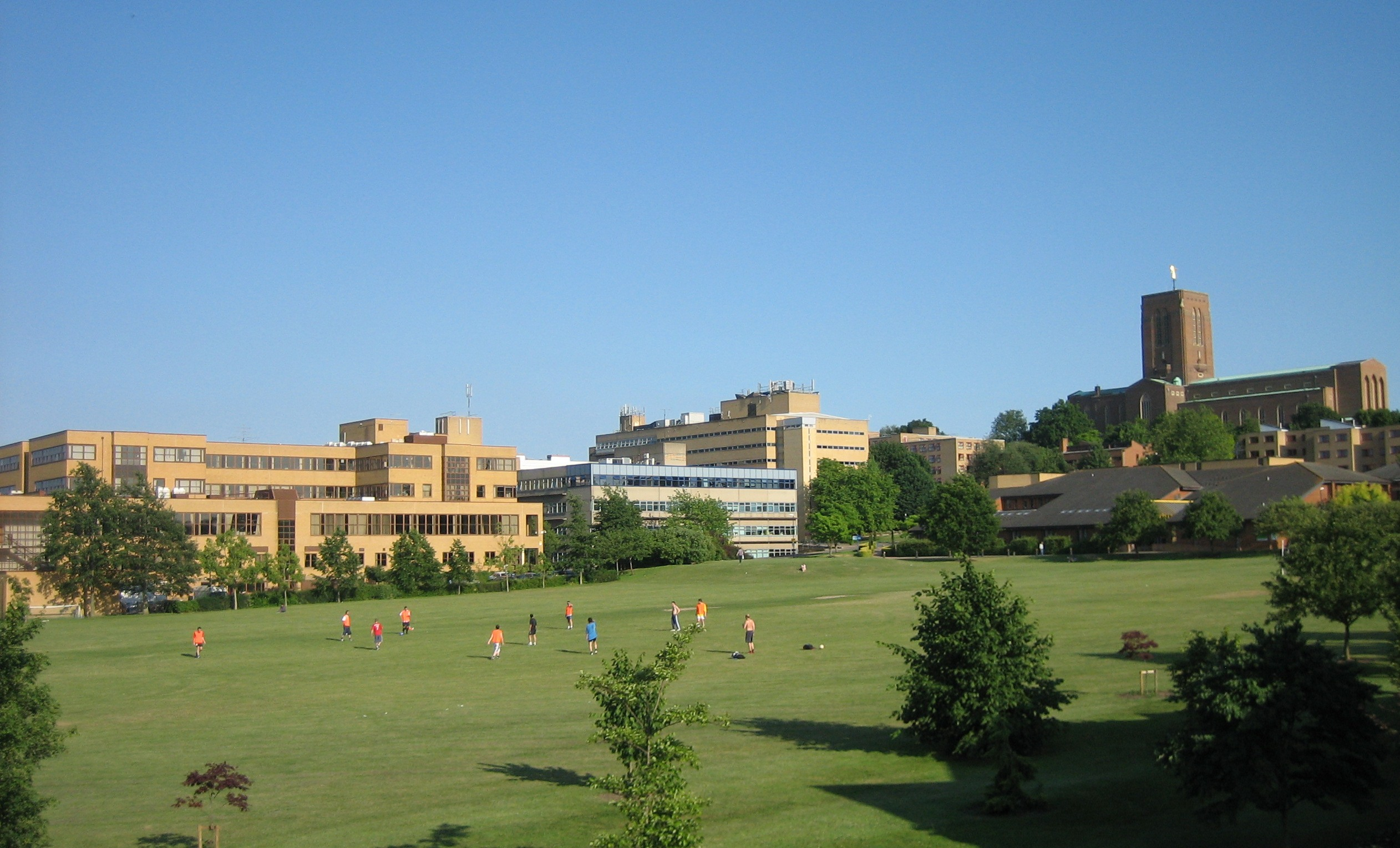
Guildford Cathedral overlooks Stag Hill campus.

=== Main sites ===
The university began moving in 1968 to a new 30 ha (74-acre) site on Stag Hill in Guildford, adjacent to Guildford Cathedral. Students continued to alternate between the original Battersea campus and the new Guildford campus until 1970. A further 90 ha (222 acres) allocated to the university remained undeveloped until 2005. The BBC's local radio station for Surrey and North-East Hampshire, BBC Surrey, has its studios on the campus. In addition the university has a student-run medium wave radio station, Stag Radio. In September 2009, the Guildford School of Acting moved into a new purpose-built facility on the main Stag Hill campus as part of a strategic merger between the two organisations. The old Sports Centre was converted into the Ivy Arts Centre, a performing arts facility housing a 200-seat theatre and studio and workshop space. In October 2015, the £45m School of Veterinary Medicine was opened by the Queen accompanied by the Duke of Edinburgh. The new Manor Park campus, designed as a car-free village, is 1.6 kilometres (1 mi) from the Stag Hill campus and on the other side of the A3 trunk road. It combines residences for students and staff, buildings for research and teaching, and sporting facilities.

=== Sports facilities ===
In April 2010, a £36 million sports centre named the Surrey Sports Park opened to replace the former UniSport facilities on the Stag Hill Campus. Surrey Sports Park is situated close to the main University campus, on its Manor Park site. It houses a 50-metre swimming pool, three multi-sports halls, six squash courts, a modern gym, three artificial floodlit pitches, outdoor tennis courts, a climbing centre and a coffee shop, bar and restaurant.

The 1,000 seat indoor arena is home to Surrey Scorchers basketball team (formerly Guildford Heat, Surrey Heat and Surrey United), who have been using the venue since 2010 following a move from their previous home at Guildford Spectrum. Surrey Scorchers are one of the leading teams and former winners of the British Basketball League, the country's top division. It also plays host to Surrey Storm netball (formerly Brunel Hurricanes), who also made the move to the Sports Park from Guildford Spectrum in 2010. Surrey Storm are two-time Netball Superleague champions, securing their last title with a 55–53 win over Manchester Thunder at London's Copper Box Arena in the 2016 Grand Final. It played host to all but four matches of the 2010 Women's Rugby World Cup (the semi-finals, third place play off and final were held at the Twickenham Stoop). It is also the official training facility for Harlequins rugby club, playing host to their Men's and Women's first teams plus Academy fixtures, and was used as a training base for the 2015 Rugby World Cup, hosting a number of teams including South Africa, Scotland and Italy.

2012 saw Surrey Sports Park host a number of Olympic and Paralympic teams in preparation for the London 2012 Olympic Games, including delegations from across the globe for swimming, table tennis, basketball and triathlon camps. In 2013, Surrey Sports Park hosted the annual Danone Nations Cup junior football tournament, with fixtures being played on the outdoor pitches through to the finals at Wembley Stadium. In 2017, Surrey Sports Park hosted the Women's Lacrosse World Cup, with over 25 nations competing for the world title in Guildford. All matches took place at the venue, including the finals, with a temporary outdoor stadium erected for the 10-day event.

== Organisation ==
=== Structure ===
The academic activities of the university are divided into the following three faculties:

Faculty of Arts & Social Sciences

- School of Economics
- School of Hospitality and Tourism Management
- School of Law
- School of Literature and Languages
- Department of Music and Media
- Department of Politics
- Department of Sociology
- Surrey Business School
- Guildford School of Acting

Faculty of Engineering and Physical Sciences

- Department of Chemistry
- Department of Chemical and Process Engineering
- Department of Civil and Environmental Engineering
- Department of Computer Science
- Department of Electrical and Electronic Engineering
- Department of Mathematics
- Department of Mechanical Engineering Sciences
- Department of Physics
- Centre for Environment and Sustainability

Faculty of Health and Medical Sciences

- School of Biosciences
- School of Health Sciences
- School of Medicine
- School of Psychology
- School of Veterinary Medicine

=== Governance ===
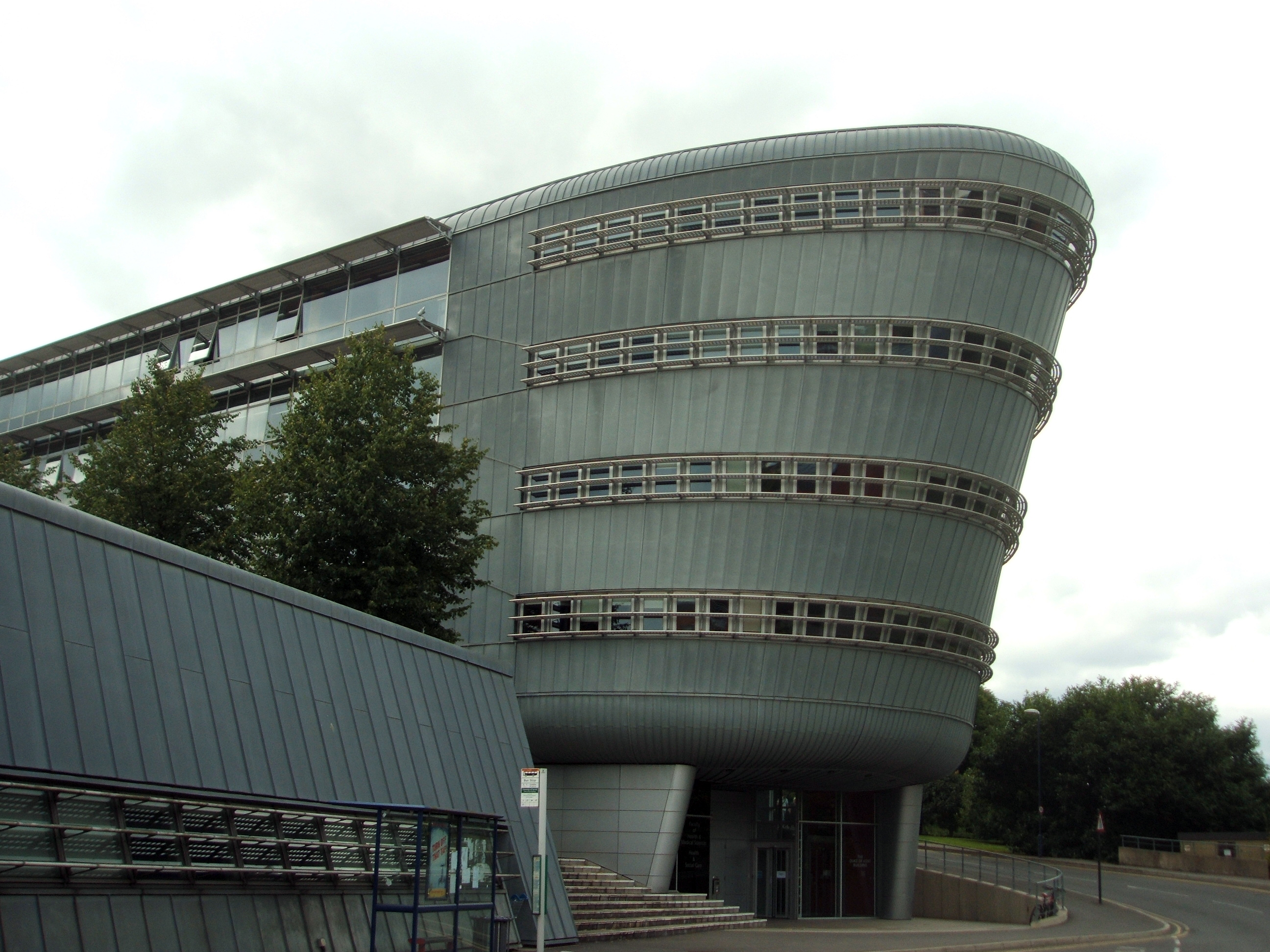
The Duke of Kent Building houses much of the Faculty of Health and Medical Sciences

Prince Edward, Duke of Kent was installed as Chancellor, a ceremonial non-residential post, in 1977. The university is led at the executive level by the President and Vice-Chancellor, as of 2025 Stephen A. Jarvis. The key bodies in the university governance structure are the council, Senate and executive board. The council is the governing body of the university, responsible for the overall planning and management of the university and to ensure processes are in place to monitor financial and operational controls, and the university's performance against its strategy. The council is composed of no fewer than eleven external members, up to seven ex-officio members and up to three members elected by Senate.

The Senate is the statutory body responsible for governing the university's academic matters, including teaching and research, and the regulation and direction of the education and conduct of students. The composition of the Senate is drawn from the academic staff of the university, together with a number of ex-officio, elected and co-opted members. The Chair of the Senate is the President and Vice-Chancellor of the university. The executive board is the senior advisory body that assists the President and Vice-Chancellor in discharging his executive authority to manage the operations and affairs of the university. It is responsible for advising on all matters relating to the university's strategy and for making recommendations to Council for approval. The above Bodies are supported by a series of Committees that oversee the activities of distinctive administrative and academic areas of the university.

On 15 September, it was announced that Professor Stephen A. Jarvis would become the university's sixth President and Vice-Chancellor, assuming his role on 15 September 2025. He succeeded Professor Max Lu who moved to take up the Vice-Chancellorship at the University of Wollongong in May 2025. Other predecessors include Patrick J. Dowling (1994–2005), Anthony Kelly (1975–1994) and Peter Leggett, the last Principal of Battersea College of Technology and the university's first Vice-Chancellor.

=== Educational links ===
Since its foundation, the university has fostered links with other educational bodies in the local community and region. The university currently validates undergraduate courses at Farnborough College of Technology and postgraduate research programmes at St Mary's University, Twickenham for students entering prior to August 2014.

In 2007, the university and Dongbei University of Finance and Economics in Dalian, China, launched the Surrey International Institute, DUFE. The SII at DUFE offers Surrey degrees and dual-degree programmes in China. A placement year link with North Carolina State University was initiated in 2009, where each institution places students from the other with companies located nearby, in the South East of England and the Carolinas, respectively.

The university holds a number of formal links with institutions from around the world to share teaching and research and facilitate staff and student exchanges.

- University of São Paulo, Brazil
- Seoul National University, South Korea
- (United States) University of Central Florida, USA
- Pakistan University of Punjab
- (United States) North Carolina State University, USA
- The DUFE—Surrey International Institute (东北财经大学萨里国际学院) is an academic partnership with the Dongbei University of Finance and Economics in Dalian, China
- University of Hong Kong
- (Singapore) Nanyang Technological University
- National Autonomous University of Mexico Head Associate; Diego Luiz.
- Modul University Vienna, Austria

== Academic profile ==
=== Research ===
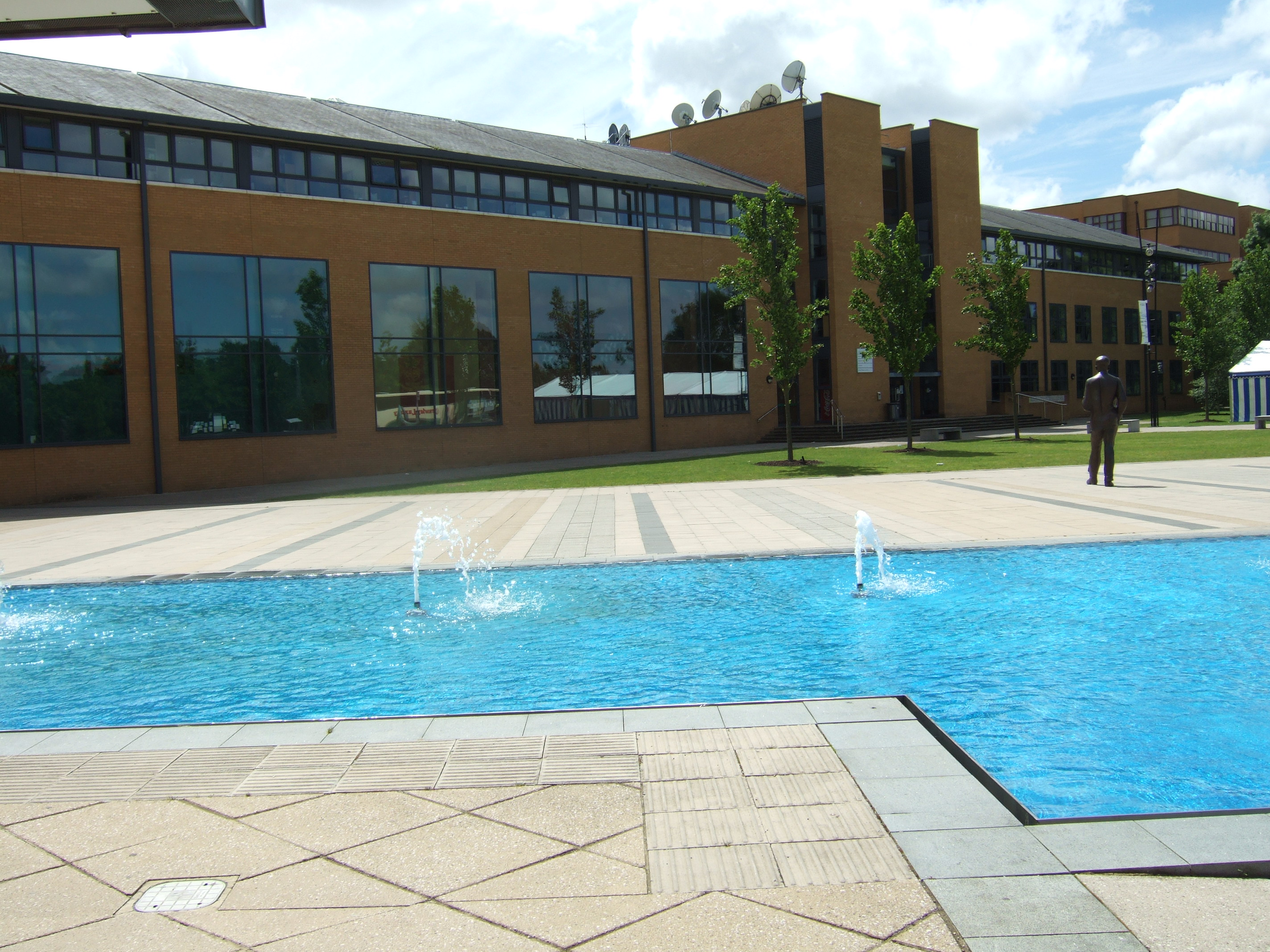
The Austin Pearce Building

The university conducts extensive research on small satellites, with its Surrey Space Centre and spin-off commercial company, Surrey Satellite Technology Ltd. In the 2001 Research Assessment Exercise, the University of Surrey received a 5* rating in the categories of "Sociology", "Other Studies and Professions Allied to Medicine", and "Electrical and Electronic Engineering" and a 5* rating in the categories of "Psychology", "Physics", "Applied Mathematics", "Statistics and Operational Research", "European Studies" and "Russian, Slavonic and East European Languages".

The 5G Innovation Centre (5GIC) at the University of Surrey opened in September 2015, for the purpose of research for the development of the first worldwide 5G network. It has gained over £40m support from international telecommunications companies including Aeroflex, MYCOM OSI, BBC, BT Group, EE, Fujitsu Laboratories of Europe, Huawei, Ofcom, Rohde & Schwarz, Samsung, Telefonica and Vodafone – and a further £11.6m from the Higher Education Funding Council for England (HEFCE).

In addition, the Surrey Research Park is a 28 ha (69-acre) low density development which is owned and developed by the university, providing large landscaped areas with water features and facilities for over 110 companies engaged in a broad spectrum of research, development and design activities. The university generates the third highest endowment income out of all UK universities "reflecting its commercially-orientated heritage."

=== Admissions ===
UCAS Admission Statistics
	2025	2024	2023	2022	2021
Applications (Note: Main scheme applications, International and UK)	34,035	31,265	29,230	27,260	29,125
Accepted	4,990	4,525	4,140	3,370	3,300
Applications/Accepted Ratio	6.8	6.9	7.1	8.1	8.8
Overall Offer Rate (%)	69.4	69.4	66.3	63.6	66.2
↳ UK only (%) (Note: UK domiciled applicants only)	69.0	69.1	65.6	62.6	64.8
Average Entry Tariff	—N/a	—N/a	129	137	143
↳ Top three exams (Note: The maximum tariff score for three exams is 168: the equivalent of A*A*A* at A-Level, 777 at HL for the IB Diploma Programme, or AAA at Advanced Higher)	—N/a	—N/a	125.6	127.9	130.8

HESA Student Body Composition (2024/25)
Domicile and Ethnicity	Total
British White (Note: Not be confused solely with White British)	46%
British Ethnic Minorities (Note: Includes those who indicate that they identify as Asian, Black, Mixed Heritage, Arab or any other ethnicity except White.)	34%
International EU	3%
International Non-EU	18%
Undergraduate Widening Participation Indicators
Female	52%
Independent School	9%
Low Participation Areas (Note: Calculated from the Polar4 measure, using Quintile1, in England and Wales. Calculated from the Scottish Index of Multiple Deprivation (SIMD) measure, using SIMD20, in Scotland.)	7%

In the 2024/25 academic year, the student body consisted of 16,430 students, composed of 12,500 undergraduates and 3,930 postgraduate students. The university is designated as a 'medium-tariff' institution by the Department for Education, with the average undergraduate entrant to the university in recent years amassing between 125–131 UCAS Tariff points in their top three pre-university qualifications – the equivalent of BBB to ABB at A-Level. Based on 2022/23 HESA entry standards data published in domestic league tables, which include a broad range of qualifications beyond the top three exam grades, the average student at the University of Surrey achieved 137 points.

According to the 2017 Times and Sunday Times Good University Guide, approximately 8% of Surrey's undergraduates come from independent schools. For the 2016–17 academic year, the university had a higher proportion of female than male students with a male to female ratio of 45:55 in the population. The undergraduate student body is composed of 73% from the UK, 11% from the EU and 16% from outside of the EU. More students graduate from Surrey with a First Class Honours degree (44.4%) than with a 2:1 degree (40.9%), placing it second amongst mainstream British universities by the proportion of First Class degrees awarded.

=== Reputation and rankings ===
Rankings
National rankings
- Complete (2027): 21
- Guardian (2027): 39
- Times / Sunday Times (2027): 25

Global rankings
- ARWU (2026): 401–500
- QS (2027): 246=
- THE (2026): 201–250

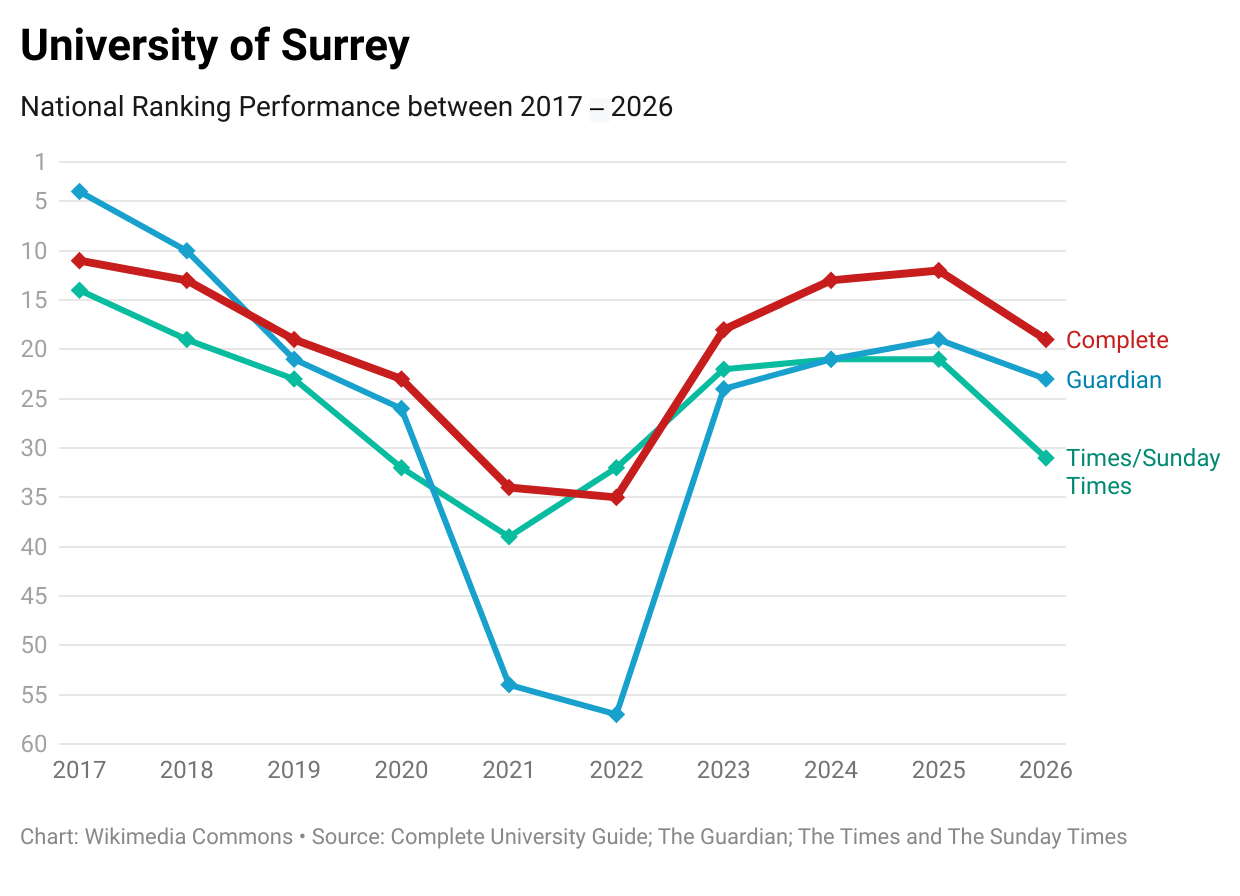
University of Surrey's national league table performance over the past ten years

The university has consistently been in the top 20 of the three main ranking compilations of universities in the United Kingdom, placing it 21st in The Times and Sunday Times, 12th in The Good University Guide and the Complete University Guide, and 19th in The Guardian University Guide for 2024.

Subjects ranked in the top 20 include Hospitality & Leisure Management and Petroleum engineering. The university was ranked seventh in the Times Higher Education Student Experience Survey 2018. In 2019, Surrey was ranked 161-170th in the QS World Employability Rankings, and first in the UK and 12th in the world for research partnerships with employers.

In 1991 the university was granted the Queen's Award for Export Achievement, and in 1996 was awarded a Queen's Anniversary Prize for Higher & Further Education in recognition of the university's outstanding achievement in satellite engineering and communications, teaching and research by the Centre for Satellite Engineering Research and associated companies. In 1998, Surrey Satellite Technology Ltd was awarded the Queen's Award for Technological Achievement, presented in person by the Queen on her second visit to the university, accompanied by the Duke of Edinburgh and the Duke of Kent, chancellor of the university.

The university was awarded a 2002 Queen's Anniversary Prize for Higher & Further Education for its research and development on optoelectronic devices and ion beam applications. In July 2007, the university was awarded Fairtrade University status by the Fairtrade Foundation. The university won a 2011 Queen's Anniversary Prize for Higher & Further Education for its research into the fields of safe water and sanitation. In 2013, the Electronic Engineering Department of the university won the 2013 Elektra Award University Department of the Year, and judged to be the most innovative and successful in Europe. The university won The Sunday Times University of the Year award 2016. The university won a 2017 Queen's Anniversary Prize for Higher & Further Education for "Leading research and teaching in food and nutrition informing public policy on diabetes, obesity, osteoporosis and other dietary related issues".

== Notable academics and alumni ==
=== Notable alumni ===
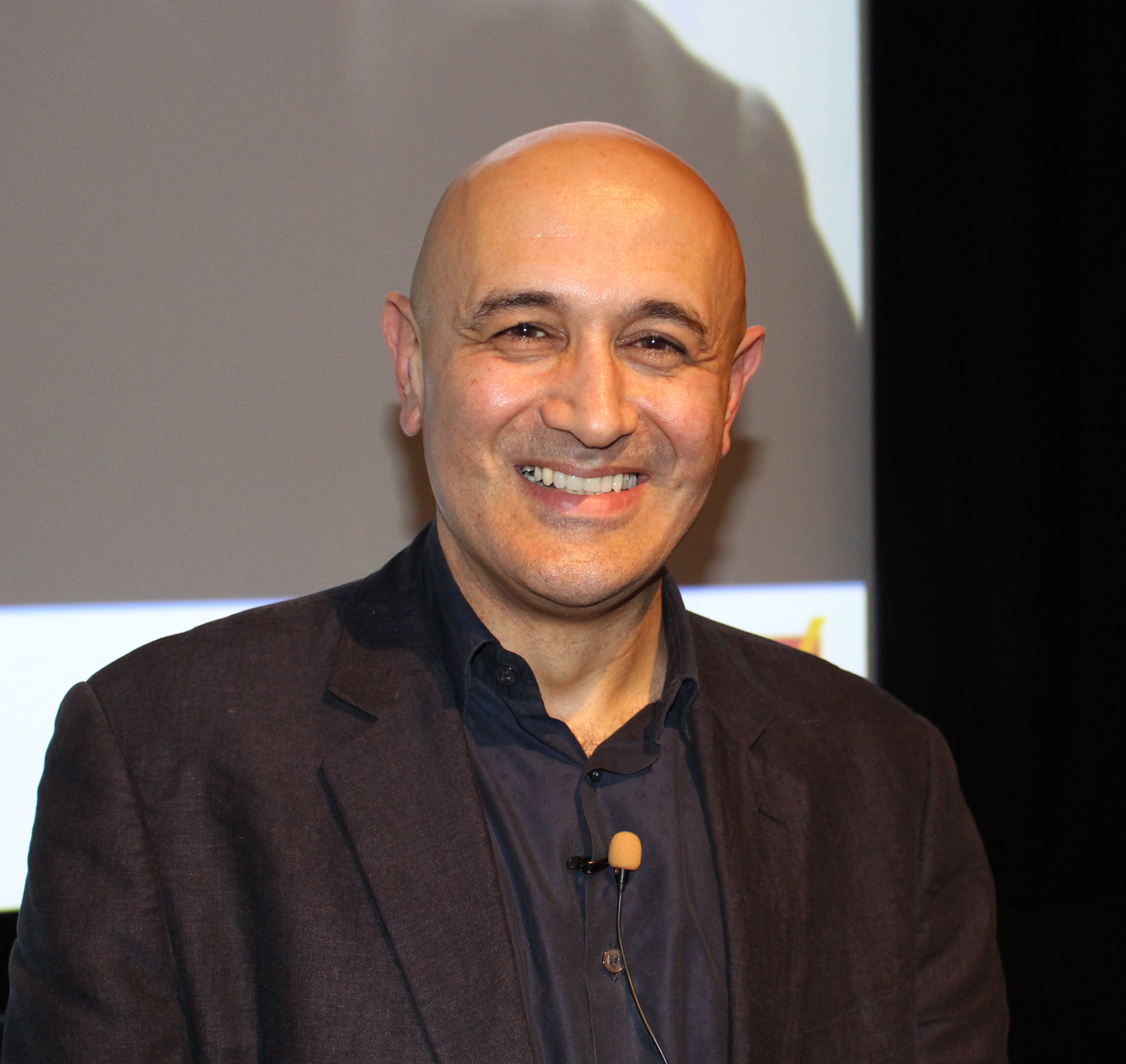
Theoretical physicist Jim Al-Khalili (BSc, 1986; PhD, 1989)

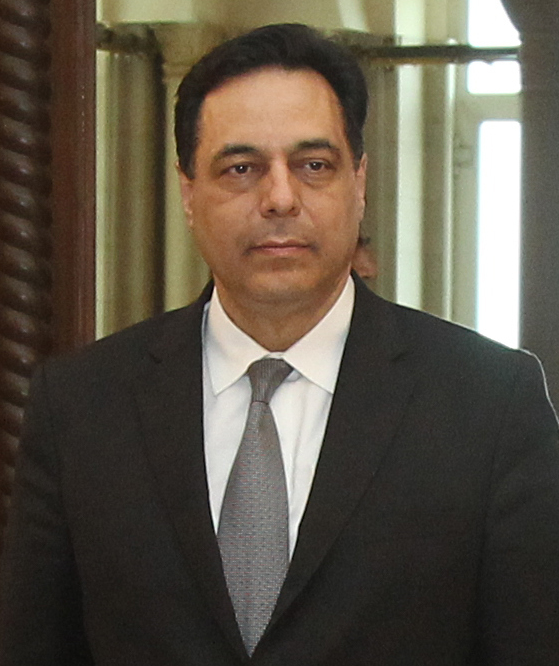
Former Prime Minister of Lebanon Hassan Diab (MSc, 1983)

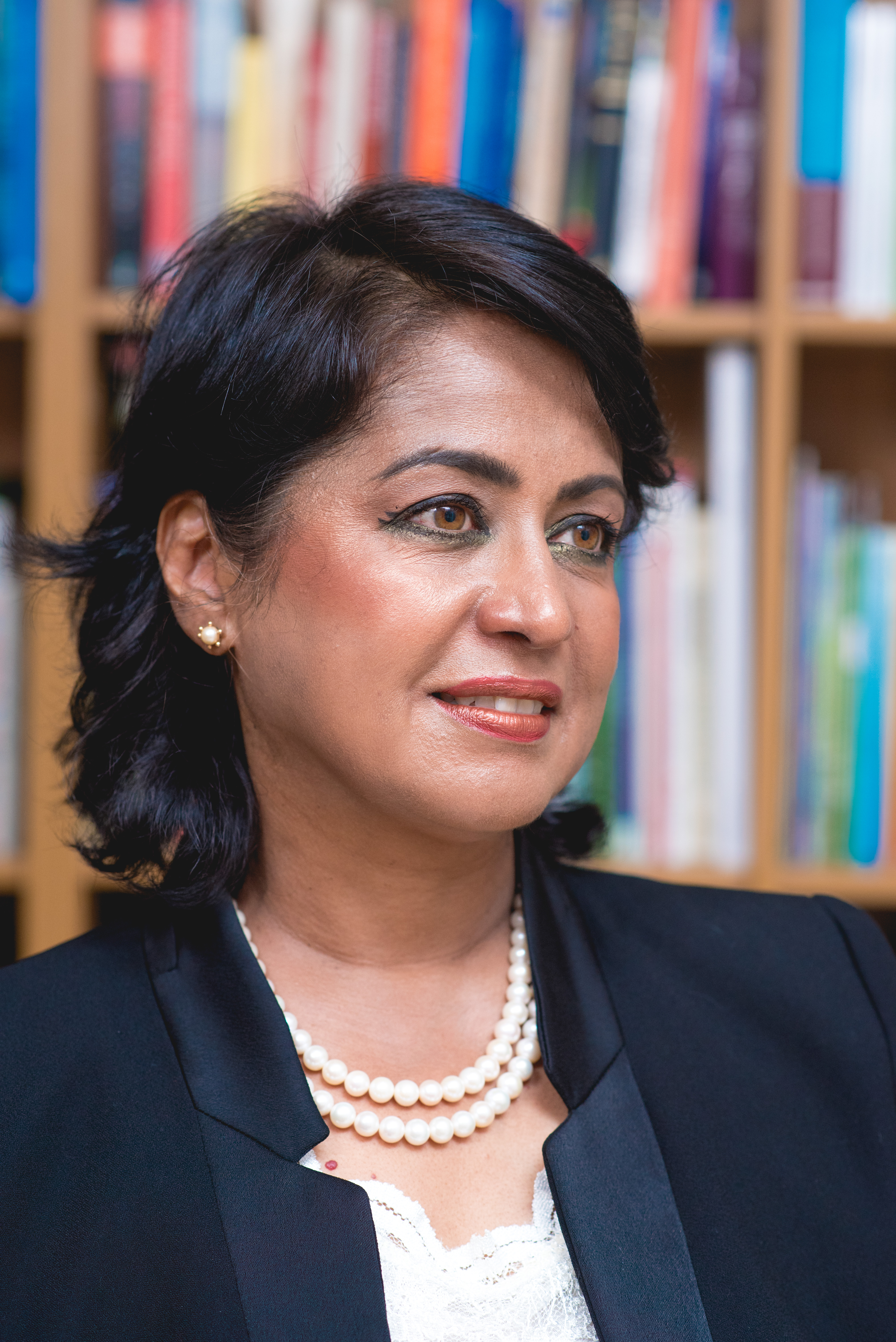
Former President of Mauritius Ameenah Gurib (BSc, 1983)

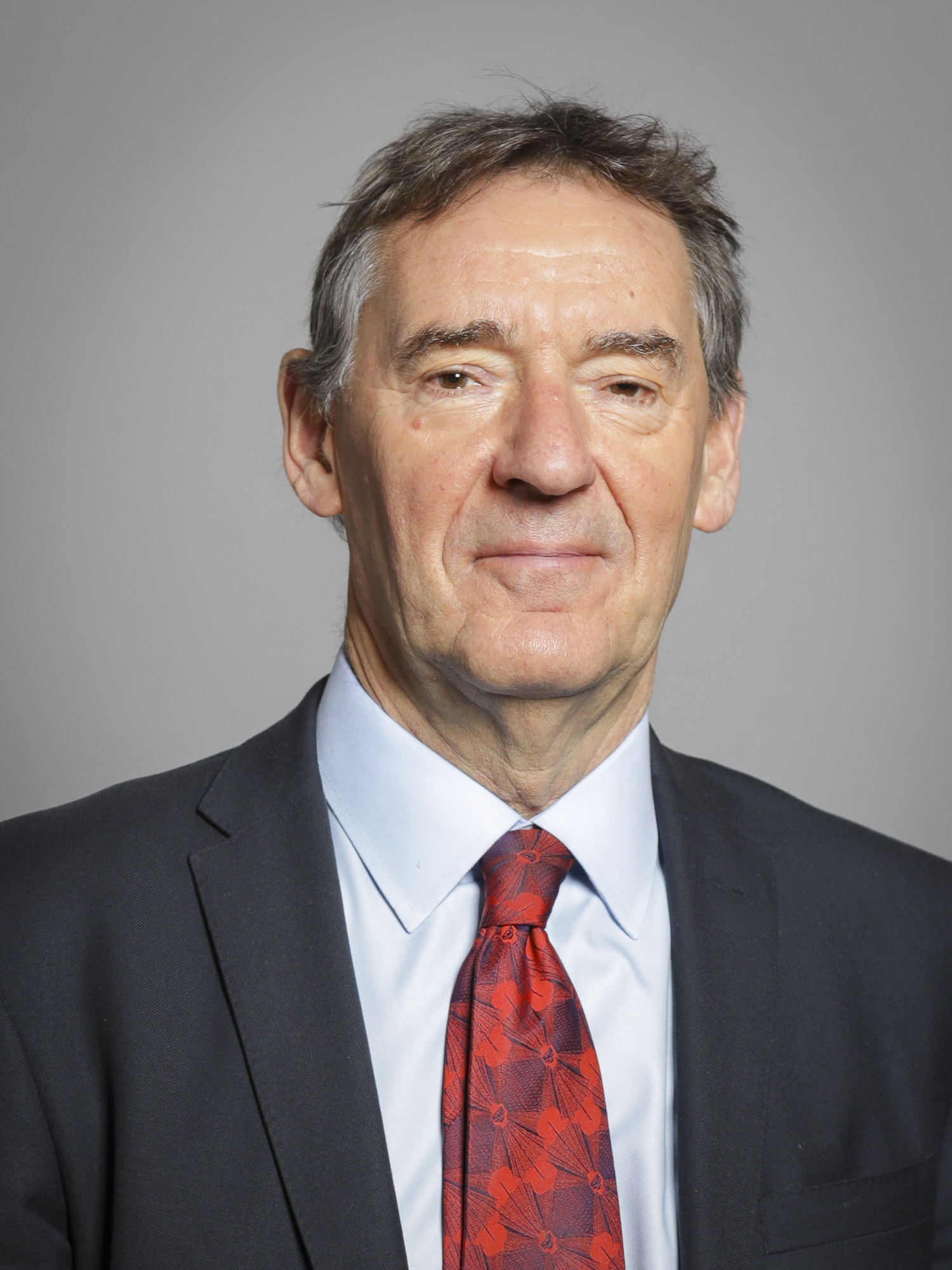
Crossbench peer Jim O'Neill, Baron O'Neill of Gatley (PhD, 1982)

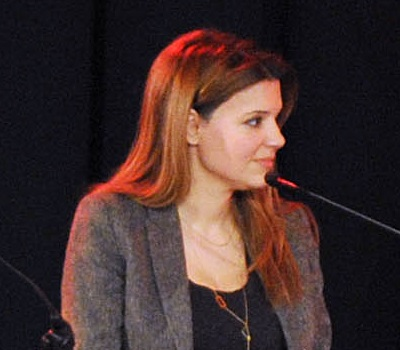
Psychologist Linda Papadopoulos (MSc)

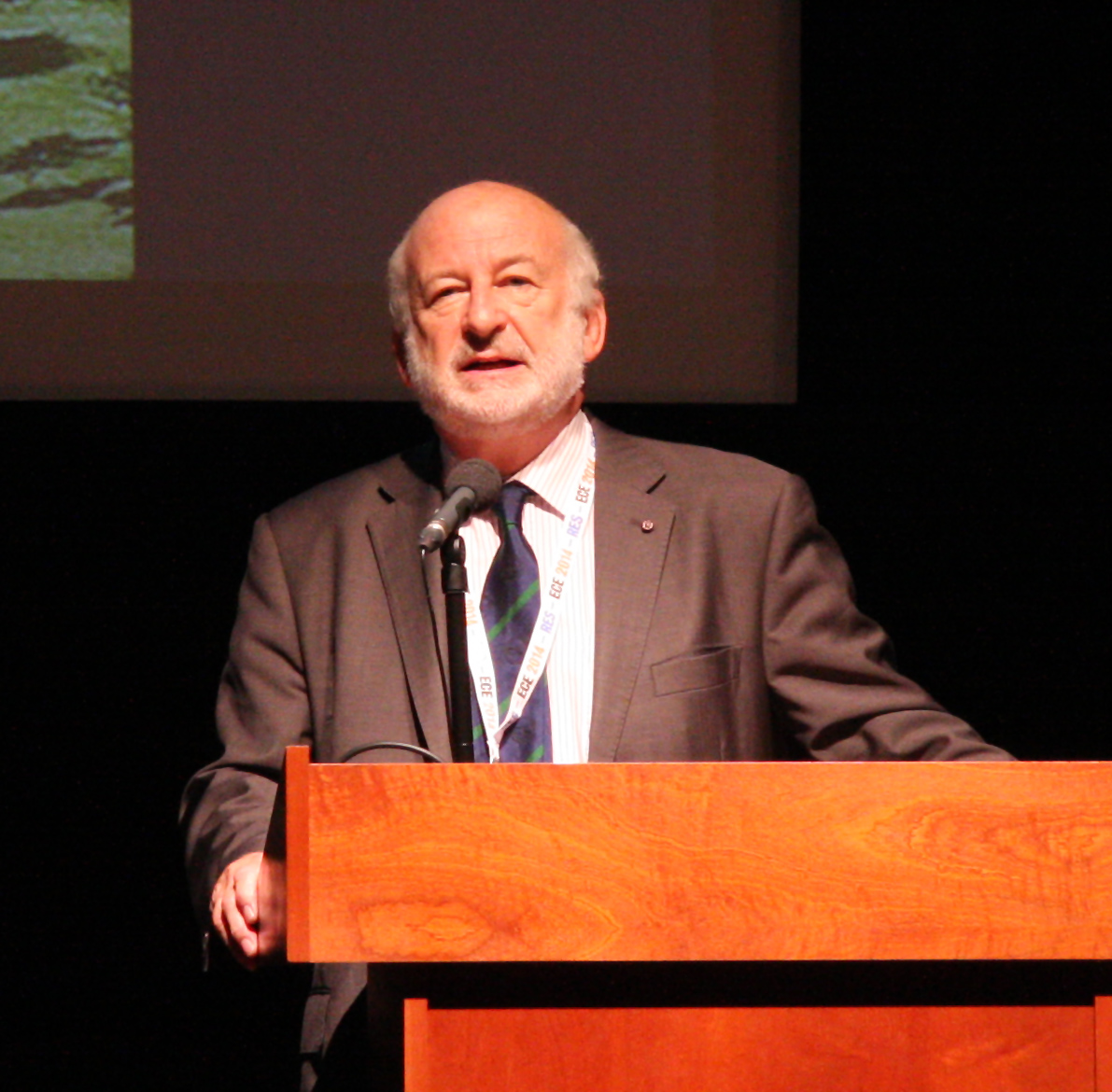
Wolf Prize in Agriculture laureate John Pickett (BSc, 1967; PhD, 1971)

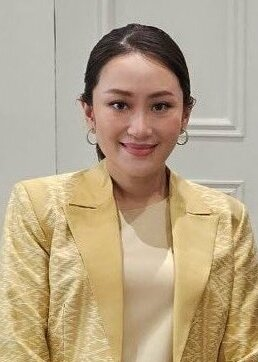
Former Prime Minister of Thailand Paetongtarn Shinawatra (MSc)

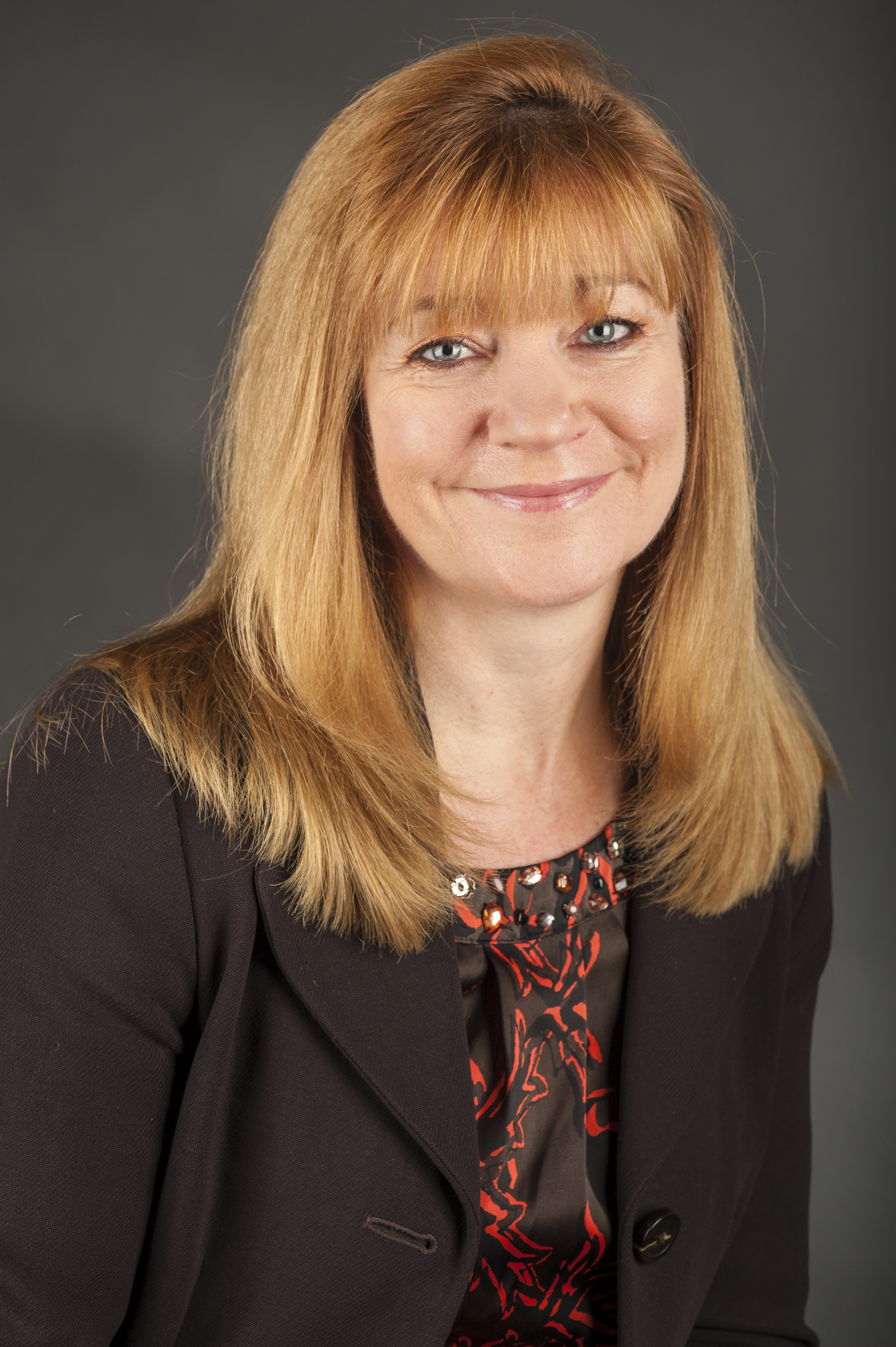
Conservative peer Kay Swinburne, Baroness Swinburne (MBA)

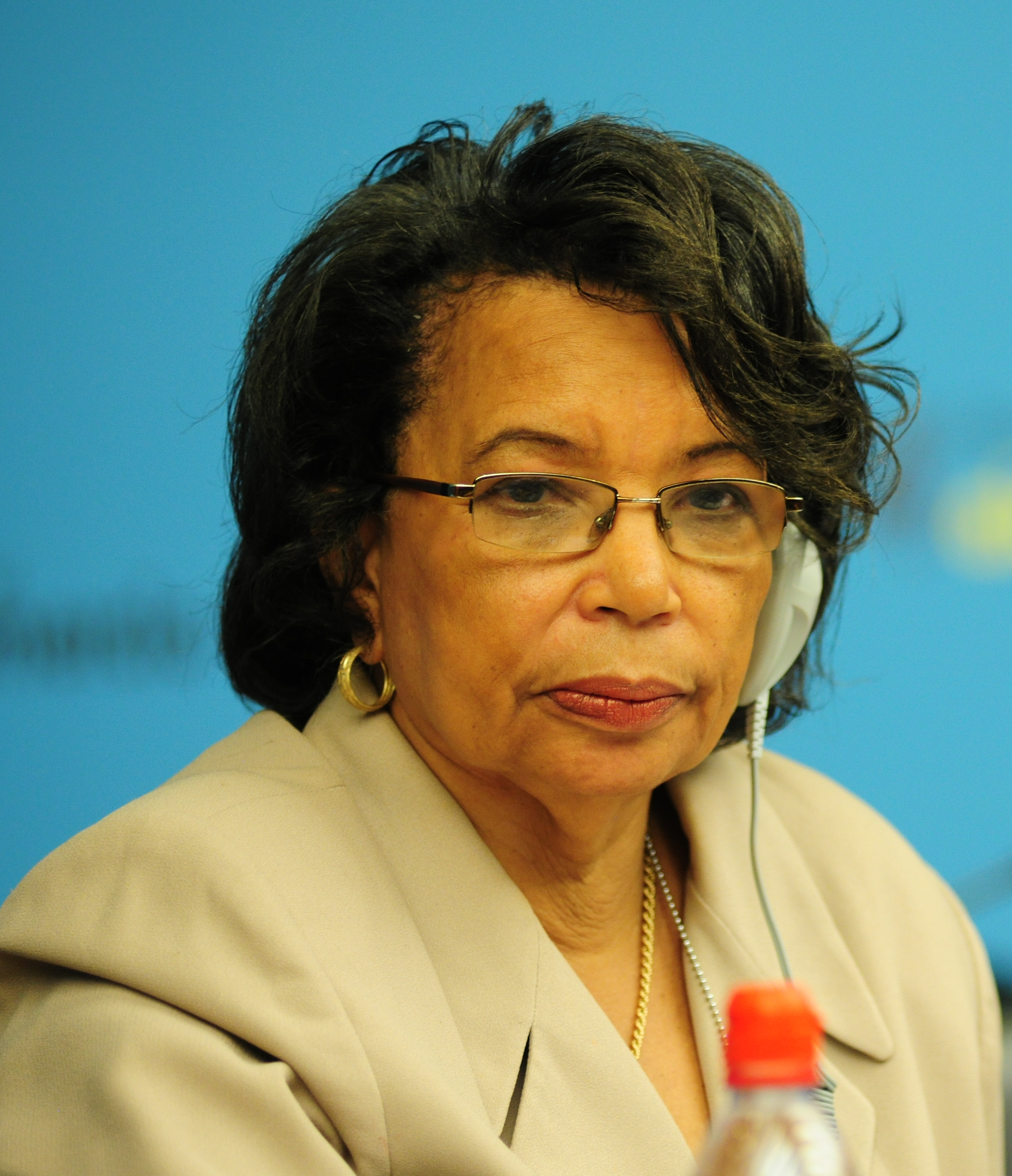
Governor of the Central Bank of Barbados Marion Vernese Williams (PhD, 1995)

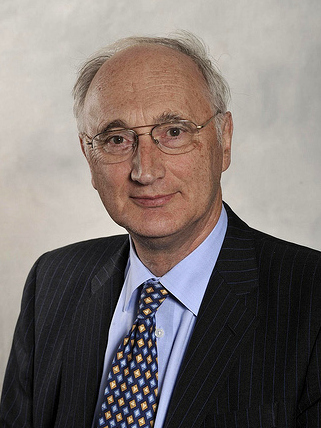
Conservative peer George Young, Baron Young of Cookham (MPhil, 1974)

=== Notable academics ===
Academics to work at the university include Alf Adams, pioneer of the strained quantum-well laser; Jim Al-Khalili, the nuclear physicist, author and broadcaster; Aleks Krotoski, the technology journalist and broadcaster; Martin Sweeting, founder of Surrey Satellite Technology Ltd; Nigel Gilbert, the sociologist pioneer in the use of agent-based models in the social sciences; Joao Santos Silva, who has made fundamental contributions to the gravity model of trade, and Martyn Barrett, who led the development of the Council of Europe's Reference Framework of Competences for Democratic Culture and is a lead expert for the Council of Europe's Education Policy Advisers Network.

The current Director of the university's Advanced Technology Institute, Ravi Silva, is known for his work in Nanotechnology. In 2003, he was awarded the Albert Einstein Silver Medal and the Javed Husain Prize by UNESCO for contributions to electronic devices. The 2011 Clifford Paterson Lecture was given by Silva because of his outstanding contributions to basic science and engineering in the field of carbon nanoscience and nanotechnology. The lecture is given annually on any aspect of engineering. The General Electric Company Limited endowed the lecture in 1975 in honour of Clifford Paterson who undertook the creation of the GEC Research Laboratories in 1919.

Surrey's Centre for Environment and Sustainability (established by Roland Clift in 1992 as the Centre for Environmental Strategy) gained attention with the publication of Prosperity Without Growth in 2009 by University of Surrey academic Tim Jackson, Professor of Sustainable Development and Director of the ESRC Research Group on Lifestyles, Values and Environment. In October 2018 the University of Surrey reported that writer and filmmaker Iain Sinclair had been appointed Distinguished Writer in Residence with their School of Literature and Languages.

On 20 May 2009, Andreas Mogensen, a researcher at the Surrey Space Centre, was announced as a new member of the European Astronaut Corps, part of the European Space Agency, thereby becoming the first Danish astronaut. In February 2011, terrorism and Northern Ireland expert Marie Breen Smyth, joined the politics department, as chair in International Relations. In March 2005, she had given evidence to the House of Commons Northern Ireland Affairs Committee Inquiry into dealing with Northern Ireland's past. Another notable academic was the late translation studies scholar Peter Newmark.

== Student life ==
=== Students' Union ===
The University of Surrey Students' Union is the sole representative body of Surrey students. They represent students on academic and welfare issues, as well as administering sports clubs and societies. The Union was incorporated as a non-profit charity in July 2011, so any takings from the Union's four commercial outlets are invested in supporting the membership side of the business. Four zones exist within the organisation representing Support, Voice, Community and Activity, with a sabbatical officer managing each one, as well as a president who is a member of the University Council. The Students' Union also organise events on a weekly basis which are held at their venues including Rubix and The Basement for students to take part in.

In 2017 the university was specifically identified in the report by the Free Speech University Rankings as having "unfamiliar" restrictions on free speech because of a collection of its union byelaws regarding university mascot Steve the Stag: the mascot is not allowed to be depicted by students to be drinking, smoking or, as the report and subsequent articles directly quote, "involved in lewd acts". Subsequent editions of the Students' Union Byelaws contained a further explanatory note for this.

=== Media ===
StagTV is the television station run by students at the University of Surrey. It is primarily run from offices on the main Stag Hill campus and it also creates content for the Students' Union, through which it is a constituted group, but has editorial independence. Other student media on campus include Stag Radio and The Stag magazine.

== See also ==
- Armorial of UK universities
- College of advanced technology (United Kingdom)
- Lewis Elton Gallery
- List of public art in Surrey
- List of universities in the UK
