= Max Lu =

Chinese–Australian engineer

Max Lu AO DL FAA FTSE FREng FIChemE FRSC
- 逯高清
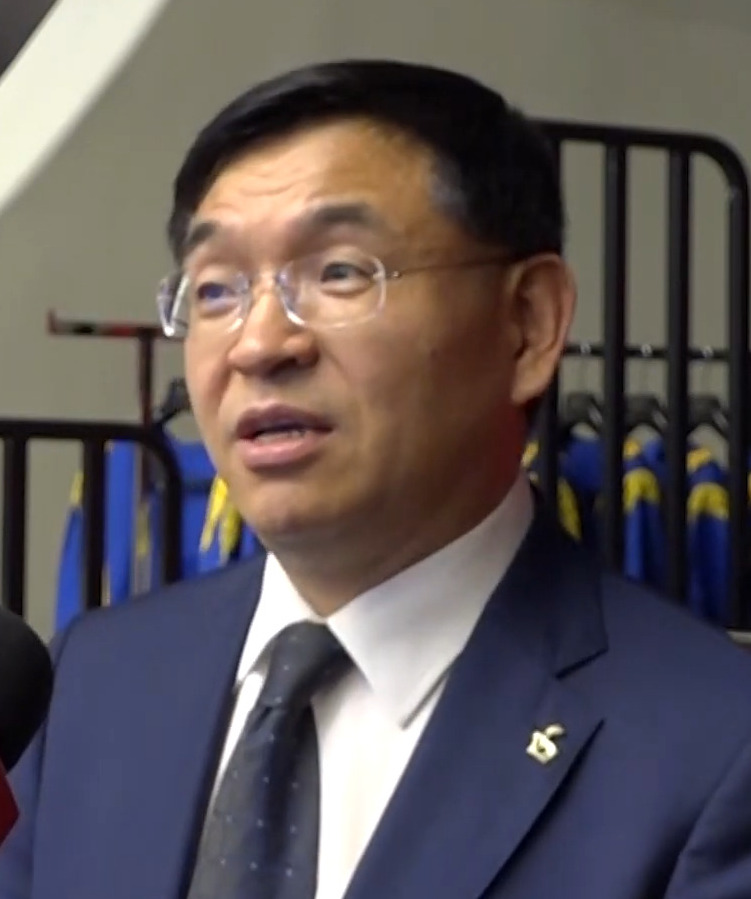

Vice-Chancellor of the University of Wollongong
- Incumbent
- Assumed office May 2025
- Preceded by: Patricia M. Davidson

Vice-Chancellor of the University of Surrey
- In office April 2016 – May 2025
- Preceded by: Sir Christopher Snowden
- Succeeded by: Stephen Jarvis

Personal details
- Born: 逯高清 "Lù Gāoqīng"; 8 November 1963 (age 63)
- Education: Northeastern University in Shenyang (B.Sc.); University of Queensland (PhD)
- Occupation: Chemical engineer, nanotechnologist
- Salary: £344,000 (2021–22)

Gaoqing Max Lu (Chinese: 逯高清; born 8 November 1963) is a Chinese–Australian chemical engineer and nanotechnologist. He has been the current Vice-Chancellor of the University of Wollongong since May 2025.

== Early life and education ==
Lu was born in the countryside of Shandong, China. He obtained his bachelor's degree in engineering from Northeastern University in Shenyang. He subsequently received a scholarship from the University of Queensland in Australia, where he earned his Ph.D. in chemical engineering with the dissertation title,'Preparation and Characterization of an Effective Sorbent for SO2 and NOx Removal Using Coal Washery Reject' in 1991.

== Career ==
Lu lectured at Nanyang Technological University, Singapore from 1991 to 1994, then held academic and leadership positions at the University of Queensland from 1994 to 2016. He began as a senior lecturer and ultimately became a chair professor. He founded the Australian Research Council Centre of Excellence for Functional Nanomaterials and served as its inaugural director for 8 years. He is a fellow of many Australian educational and research boards, and has sat on several committees of its government. In March 2016, Lu set aside funding for education students at the University of Queensland to be able to take pre-teacher literacy and numeracy tests paid for by the university. He also contributed to a public safety campaign for Chinese tourists in Queensland.

Lu was previously the Provost and Senior Vice-president at the University of Queensland, and is currently the President and Vice-Chancellor of the University of Surrey in Guildford, a position he has held since April 2016. He is also an emeritus professor at the University of Queensland Institute of Bioengineering and Nanotechnology.

In August 2017, Professor Lu was appointed by Prime Minister Theresa May to the Council for Science and Technology. By November 2017, Lu had established partnerships in his Vice-Chancellor role: one of Guildford and the University of Surrey with his hometown of Dongying, and one between the University of Surrey and a conservatoire in Sharjah, UAE. The only university in Dongying is the China University of Petroleum, focused on oil mining. In 2016, Lu had affirmed that establishing links between the University of Surrey and his homeland was a priority.

On his university managerial direction, Lu wrote in a 2019 University of Surrey-published blog post (about the humanities existing to support technological development) that he doesn't think the liberal arts approach of US universities is good, and that students should take degrees that are job-oriented. Though, he does acknowledge in the post that others criticise this view as making students technically qualified, but not educated.

Lu was appointed as the Vice-Chancellor and President of the University of Wollongong on the 28th of May 2025.

== Recognitions ==
=== United Kingdom ===
Lu has been appointed to the Boards of UKRI, National Physical Laboratory, Universities UK and the Leadership Council of the National Centre for Universities and Business. He was also made a deputy lieutenant of Surrey and is a patron of Transform Housing & Support. He has an honorary degree from the University of Strathclyde. In September 2019, he was elected a Fellow of the Royal Academy of Engineering.

=== Australia ===
Lu, who helped found and is a board member of the Australian Research Council (ARC), won its Federation Fellowship in both 2003 and 2008. He has also been named among Australia's Top 100 Most Influential Engineers, in 2013, being named to the Queensland Greats Award this same year. In 2014, Lu was awarded an Australia-China Achievement Award for Education and in 2017 he was appointed an Officer of the Order of Australia.

=== International ===
Lu has also been given several awards from other nations or international bodies. They are: Orica Award, 2001; Le Fevre Prize, 2002; RK Murphy Medal, 2003; ExxonMobil Award, 2007; China International Science and Technology Cooperation Award, 2011; Chemeca Medal, 2011; Japan Chemical Society Lecture Award, 2015; and the P.V. Danckwerts Lecture, 2016. He was elected a foreign member of the Chinese Academy of Sciences in 2019.

== Controversies ==
=== Dongying-Guildford twinning ===
The choice to twin Guildford, the town of the University of Surrey, and Lu's hometown of Dongying, as well as Lu's involvement in the process, was a subject of controversy for Guildford council in 2017. The Guildford Alderman the Hon. Bernard Parke noted that unlike the town's previous twinning agreement, the public and council consultations had been by-passed for the partnership with Dongying. Other councillors also criticised the expedience, as they had not been informed of the intentions to twin with the city and had been in talks with other potential partners for some time, plans that had to be scrapped. Lu's involvement was criticised as lacking "openness and transparency", with some councillors also asserting that "due diligence" in the approval of the city had not been performed. The council leader Paul Spooner responded by saying that he had needed to act quickly in order to travel to China with Lu, and the whole council voted not to accept financial assistance for travel costs offered by Dongying.

In June 2019, Lu's connection to Liaoning was being used by the county of Surrey to push a partnership for the county with the Chinese province.

=== Queensland salary ===
In 2016, Lu's pay and bonuses at the University of Queensland, totalling AUS$736,600, came under fire in a piece discussing the university "crying poor ... [but giving] their senior executives larger and larger pay packets while doing everything in their power to squeeze the salaries of their employees"; the article noted that Lu and many of his peers earned more than the heads of government departments and business CEOs.

=== University of Surrey ===
==== Criticism of salary and expenses ====
In 2018, Channel 4's Dispatches broadcast a report on the pay and expenses of British university officials, including revealing that Lu was given £1,600 to relocate his family dog. The University of Surrey responded by saying that this was "reasonable relocation expenses". It was also reported that the university paid for Lu's membership to the elite Athenaeum Club, London, at £2,610 a year. The university claimed this was a "cost-effective" solution for Lu to have private meetings in London. In an article about the documentary's findings, The Guardian listed various expenses but concluded that "Few, though, can beat the £1,600 spent on relocating a pet dog from Australia to Britain". Both the article and Robert Halfon MP compared the dog relocation expense to the "Duck Island" incident from a 2009 MP expense scandal. The Spectator compared Professor Lu to the former Chinese Communist propaganda minister, Lu Wei, and said that though the relocation expense was "small change" it reflects the lack of moral authority in universities that strip lecturers of pensions and give students decades of debt.

Also in the year, more controversy arose over Vice Chancellors' remuneration, with Lu among the highest paid in the UK. The university responded to the controversy by claiming that his pay had been overstated, and "insisted that the Office for Students should have stated the basic salary of [Lu] as £314,000 in 2017-18"; it had been stated as £364,000, with the Office for Students telling the Financial Times that "it was £364,000, including a £50,000 contribution to his pension". Lu had taken a pay cut from his previous position in Australia when he moved to Surrey; his total 2017/18 remuneration was £419,000.

The controversy reappeared in early 2019, specifically for Lu, when the University of Surrey announced that they would have to fire staff because of a deficit. The university magazine, The Stag, published an article titled 'Paygate: The Problem with Surrey's Vice-Chancellor', in which it compared his "performance-related bonuses" to the university's actual performance.

==== Vote of no confidence ====
In May 2019 and 2024, the staff and students of the University of Surrey held a no confidence vote against the university management. Of staff who voted, 96% gave a vote of no confidence in 2019, and 97% in 2024 in "the Vice-Chancellor and Executive Board". The all-staff vote was approved by all three trade unions represented at the university, in a meeting held with the largest member attendance seen. Concerns raised by staff specifically include "Lu's language which suggests staff are a cost rather than an asset", according to the University and College Union, while the Students' Union was specifically concerned about the closure of many arts courses at the university despite a "healthy" number of applications for them. Students who wanted a "no" vote hoped this result would make the university management "engage with staff and students and discuss changes"; only one student ran the campaign supporting the management, though the debate between union students was said to hold "twinges of sympathy for Max Lu".

== Personal life ==
Lu has children and a pet Maltese dog named Oscar.

In December 2018, Lu, who has previously advised the Chinese government, said that he supported the theory behind its new social policy but raised concerns over how efficiently it could be enforced.

== Books ==
- G.Q. Max Lu and X.S. Zhao (Eds.). Nanoporous Materials: Science and Engineering. Imperial College Press, 2004.
- Jian Liu and G.Q. Max Lu (Eds.). Nanoreactors and Innovative Applications. World Scientific Publishing, 2026.

Academic offices
Preceded by Sir Christopher Snowden	Vice-Chancellor of the University of Surrey; 2016–present	Incumbent
