= Alf Adams =

British physicist

Alf Adams FRS
- Alfred Rodney Adams
- Born: 11 November 1939 (age 86)
- Education: University of Leicester
- Known for: Strained quantum-well lasers
- Awards: FRS (1996)
- Scientific career
- Institutions: University of Surrey; Karlsruhe Institute of Technology; Tokyo Institute of Technology
- Thesis: The electrical and optical properties of ortho-rhombic sulphur crystals (1964)
- Doctoral advisor: Walter Eric Spear
- Website: surrey.ac.uk/physics/people/alf_adams

Alfred Rodney Adams (born 1939) is a British physicist who invented the strained-layer quantum-well laser. Most modern homes will have several of these devices in their homes in all types of electronic equipment.

He served as a Distinguished Professor of Physics at the University of Surrey, where he headed the Optoelectronic Materials and Devices Research Group. He is now retired and holds the position of emeritus professor. He was awarded the Duddell Medal and Prize in 1995, and elected as a Fellow of the Royal Society in 1996. In 2014 he was awarded the Rank Prize in Optoelectronics for his pioneering work on strained-layer laser structures.

== Early life and education ==
Adams was born to a non-academic family. His grandmother had died from tuberculosis and his father was born with TB thus being excused from school on medical grounds, before working as cobbler, boxer and gym owner. Adams' mother left school at the age of 12. Adams was evacuated from Hadleigh, Essex during The Blitz in World War II. After taking his eleven-plus exam he attended the local technical school where he represented Southeast Essex at both football and cricket.

He attended University of Leicester to study physics, in part because he didn't have the foreign language qualifications demanded by most other universities. He also completed his PhD at Leicester with Professor Walter Eric Spear on Orthorhombic crystal systems, before doing postdoctoral research in Physics at Karlsruhe Institute of Technology in Germany, where he met and married his wife Helga.

== Career ==
Back in Britain at the University of Surrey he conducted microwave research using Gallium arsenide crystals under high pressure. In 1980 he took a sabbatical to work on semiconductor lasers at the Tokyo Institute of Technology in Japan.

After returning to the University of Surrey to continue research. While walking with his wife Helga on Bournemouth beach he realised that by straining semiconductor crystals he could alter the propensity of the electrons to move from low energy to high energy orbits, and vice versa, thus transforming the efficiency of laser light production. The genesis of the strained layer laser (aka strained quantum well laser). He did not patent the idea and so received no financial gain from a technology that is used in virtually every household in the world.

== Honours and awards ==
In 1995 he was awarded the Duddell Medal and Prize and in 1996 was elected as a Fellow of the Royal Society. His nomination for the Royal Society reads:

Distinguished for his pioneering work on the application of high pressure techniques to the study of semiconducting materials, Professor Adams has done much to advance the use of strain as an important variable in understanding the basic physics of devices. His contributions include the first demonstration of the Gamma-L-X ordering of the conduction band minima in GaAs, the first direct observations of scattering by the central cell potential of impurities, the proposal and experimental confirmation of intervalence band absorption as an important loss mechanism in semiconductor lasers and the prediction that the threshold current in a quantum-well laser can be greatly reduced if the wells are grown in a state of compressive stress. These latter ideas are currently being pursued vigorously around the world where they are resulting in lasers having greatly enhanced performance.

Since retirement from the University of Surrey he holds the position of emeritus professor.

In 2014 he was awarded the Rank Prize in Optoelectronics for his pioneering work on strained-layer laser structures.

In March 2014 he was the subject of the BBC Radio 4 programme, Professor Jim Al-Khalili's The Life Scientific
