= Stag Radio =

Coordinates: 51°16′13.44″N 0°40′21.25″W

- Guildford; United Kingdom
- Broadcast area: University of Surrey Stag Hill Campus
- Frequency: 1350 AM

Programming
- Format: Campus radio

Ownership
- Owner: University of Surrey Students Union

History
- First air date: 1972 (2013 as Stag Radio)
- Call sign meaning: University Mascot

Technical information
- Power: 1 W

Links
- Webcast: Listen
- Website: https://stagradio.com/

Stag Radio is the radio station run by the students of the University of Surrey in Guildford, Surrey, England, which broadcasts on 1350AM during term-time. It is a long-term restricted service licence broadcaster operating under a low-power AM licence.

== History ==
The radio station started out as University Radio Surrey in 1972, before being rebranded as Guildford Campus Radio (GCR) in 1990. In 2001 the radio station was renamed GU2 after the postcode prefix of the area surrounding the University campus. Following the rebranding GU2 won the title of "Best Station" at the 2002 SRA Awards reflecting the pursuit of an innovative format featuring favourites such as The J-Team, Ben Lander, Gareth Davies, Pinal Gandhi ("P") with The Vibe and a fair smattering of Greek language and religious content overnight. GU2 also won the award for "Best Interview" at the 2010 SRA awards. James Alexander won the award for his interview with Sue Doughty, member of the Liberal Democrats and most recently Adam Read and Olivia Jones took Silver in Student Radio Chart Show 2013.

In 2004 the radio station was visited by Prince Edward, Earl of Wessex as part of his trip to the University. Also in that year GU2, along with many other UK student radio stations, faced a crisis when the Student Broadcast Network (SBN) closed down. SBN had not only been providing the station with a source of income, but also providing news and music programmes to fill gaps in the schedule.

Other notable visitors include Cliff Richard who was interviewed by the station. In more recent times, members have conducted interviews with We Are Scientists, Wheatus, Alter Bridge, Glasvegas, The Twang, The Commitments, Vengaboys, Dan Le Sac Vs. Scroobius Pip, Empire of the Sun, Ivyrise, Anberlin, Faithless, White Lies, Bo Burnham and Michael Price.

In 2010, the station featured in national newspaper, The Guardian, in an article by Lucy Tobin, about the importance of extra-curricular activities to give employability.

In 2013, the station was re-branded to Stag Radio; the most recent and current radio name that has been taken on by Surrey Student Union. It is sometimes referred to as one of four prominent "Stag Media" societies, including Stag Radio, Stag TV, Stag Magazine and Surrey Stage Crew.

== Organisation ==
Stag Radio is a society and is run by a committee elected at annual general meetings held at the university. All students of the university are eligible to stand and vote in these elections. Stag Radio society has a constitution based on that of its parent body- the University of Surrey Students' Union.

The current committee structure has three signatories: Station Manager, Vice President, and Treasurer. Underneath these positions are the various Heads of vital aspects in the running of Stag Radio. The other roles within the station include the Tech manager, Music Interviews manager and Events Manager

A historical table of known signatories is below. Signatories are often involved in other non-committee roles within the society prior to their election, including in events, marketing, production and media.

Position	1977	1978	2003–04	2004–05	2005–06	2006–07	2007–08	2008–09	2009–10	2010–11	2011–12	2012–13	2013–14	2014–15	2015–16	2016–17	2017–18	2018–19	2019–20	2020–21	2021–22	2022–23	2023–24	2024–25	2025–26	2026–27
Station Manager	Andy Roberts	Robin Bussell	Nathan Whitaker									Ben Illsley						Adil Aslam			Ben Ainslie	Dylan Norman	Adam Gorry	Risper Okello	Sahil Korabandi	Christy Quirke
Deputy Station Manager														Christopher Remie								Alice Lane	Oscar Ovenden	Sahil Korabandi	Christy Quirke	TBC
Treasurer																						Joshua Stanway	Risper Okello	Christy Quirke	Sofia Varela	TBC
