= Marie Breen Smyth =

Northern Ireland academic

Marie Breen Smyth (born 26 January 1953) is an author, teacher and researcher from Northern Ireland. She has published on topics such as the Northern Ireland conflict, particularly the human impact, trauma, victim politics, children and armed conflict, research ethics and methods, religion and conflict, and issues to do with political violence in Southern Africa, Israel/Palestine and Northern Ireland.

She was previously known as Marie Smyth but adopted the surname of her husband, Alan Johnston Breen, after his death on 7 July 2005.

== Career ==
From February 2011 to August 2015 she was Chair in International Politics at the University of Surrey, England, UK.

She was previously Reader in International Politics and Director of the Centre for the Study of Radicalisation and Contemporary Political Violence at Aberystwyth University, Wales, UK.

Between 2002 and 2003 she was Jennings Randolph Senior Fellow at the United States Institute of Peace in Washington DC.

She left the University of Surrey on 1 August 2015 and moved to the United States.

== Contemporary debates ==
In March 2005, Breen-Smyth, (then Smyth) gave evidence to the House of Commons' Northern Ireland Affairs Committee Inquiry into Dealing with Northern Ireland's past. Her evidence was based on her work with victims, through the "Cost of the Troubles Study".

In 2006 Breen-Smyth with Richard Jackson and Jeroen Gunning co-authored a paper The Case for a Critical Terrorism Studies proposing that a new discipline was required to stimulate debate and widen the discourse within orthodox terrorism studies.

On 13 February 2007, The Guardian published an article 'The abuse of research' by Breen Smyth and Jeroen Gunning in which they argue that the sources of funding and the political agendas of think tanks should be taken into account when interpreting their findings, and may mean that their reports need to be treated with care. The article argues that the politicisation of research can lead to serious distortions in the understanding of policy issues.

In April 2008, Breen-Smyth was the subject of an attack by right wing journalist Melanie Phillips who based her attack on the assertions and documentation provided by an anonymous student who took one of Breen-Smyth's courses at Aberystwyth. Phillips wrote to the Vice Chancellor of Aberystwyth complaining that Breen Smyth was a 'subversive' and shouldn't be allowed to teach. However, Breen Smyth was supported by the university and many claiming to be her students.

In 2007 Breen-Smyth was one of those shortlisted for what was envisaged as a single post of Victims Commissioner for Northern Ireland, but she was not among the four Commissioners eventually appointed in January 2008. Breen-Smyth opposed the appointment of four commissioners instead of one, which required new legislation delayed by an unsuccessful judicial review brought by victims' representative Michelle Williamson. Breen-Smyth separately launched a legal challenge to the appointments in the employment tribunals, claiming discrimination on the grounds of religious belief, political opinion and sex, but this was rejected in February 2011.

== Voluntary work ==
Breen-Smyth is currently involved in "Healing Through Remembering," a project established to consider how Northern Ireland might deal with its past, which involves people from all sides of the conflict. Her latest book Truth Recovery and Justice After Conflict: Managing Violent Pasts. (Abingdon: Routledge) deals with the subject of truth recovery.

In the 1980s, Breen-Smyth co-founded "Derry Well Woman", a free health and support service for women based in the North West of Ireland.

== Publications ==
With Richard Jackson (University of Otago), Jeroen Gunning (Durham University), Piers Robinson (Manchester University) and George Kassimeris (Wolverhampton University) Breen Smyth currently edits the Routledge journal Critical Studies on Terrorism. This team, including Breen Smyth, have argued for the establishment of a new critical turn in terrorism studies, and the development of critical terrorism studies.

=== Selected books ===
- (2007) Truth and justice after violent conflict: managing violent pasts. Abingdon: Routledge.
- (2002) Northern Ireland After the Good Friday Agreement: Victims, Grievance and Blame. London: Pluto (with Mike Morrissey) ISBN 0-7453-1673-5 (247pp)
- (2000). Personal Accounts of Northern Ireland’s Troubles: Public Chaos, Private Loss. London: Pluto, (with Marie-Therese Fay) ISBN 0-7453-1618-2 (150pp)
- (1999) Northern Ireland’s Troubles: The Human Costs. London: Pluto. (with Marie-Therese Fay and Mike Morrissey) 0-7453137-4-4 (229pp)
- (1998) Half the Battle: Understanding the Impact of the Troubles on Children and Young People. Derry Londonderry, INCORE / the United Nations University and the University of Ulster. ISBN 0-9533305-2-4. 174pp.
- (1996) Hemmed in and Hacking it: Life in Two Enclaves. Derry: Guildhall Press. ISBN 0-946451-33-8

=== Selected edited works ===
- (2005) Researching Conflict in Africa: Insights and Experiences. Tokyo: United Nations University Press. (with Gillian Robinson, Eghosa Osage, Albrecht, Schnabel and Lis Porter) (eds)
- (2004) Researchers and their 'subjects:’ ethics, power, knowledge and consent. Bristol: Policy Press. (ed with Emma Williamson) ISBN 1-86134-514-3 (227pp)
- (2001) Researching Violently Divide Societies: Ethical and Methodological Issues. Tokyo: United Nations University Press. (with Gillian Robinson) (eds) ISBN 0-7453-1820-7 (227pp)
- (2000) Working With Children and Young People in Violently Divided Societies: Papers from South Africa and Northern Ireland. Derry Londonderry, INCORE / the United Nations University and the University of Ulster. (with Kirsten Thomson) (eds) ISBN 0-9533305-8-3 (246pp)

=== Public exhibitions ===
- (1998) Do You Know What’s Happened? Personal Accounts and Images of the Troubles. (Output of the Cost of the Troubles Study) Opened November, 1998 by Secretary of State for Northern Ireland, Dr Marjorie Mowlam, The Great Hall, Belfast City Hall; toured venues, including House of Commons, Westminster, Glasgow, Dublin.
- (1998) Do You See What I See? Young People’s Experience of the Troubles in their own words and photographs. (Output of research on children and political violence) Opened May, 1998, by Assistant Secretary of State for Northern Ireland Adam Ingram, in University of Ulster School of Art and Design, York Street, touring various venues in Northern Ireland, England and the Republic of Ireland.
- (1996) Hemmed in and Hacking It: Words and Images from Two Enclave Areas; (Output of the Templegrove Action Research Project on sectarian division in Derry/Londonderry) opened in Derry Central Library. Toured venues in the North West: archived in Derry Central Library.

=== Film and video ===
- (2000) And Then There Was Silence... feature documentary/training video with accompanying training notes. 90 minutes. The Cost of the Troubles Study/Northern Visions.
- (1999) Do You See What I See? Young People’s Experience of the Troubles. The Cost of the Troubles Study /Ulster Television/ Save the Children.
