= Martyn Barrett =

British social scientist

Martyn Barrett FBPsS FAcSS FRSA
- Martyn Barrett, portrait from 2023
- Born: Martyn David Barrett; 18 June 1951 (age 75); London Borough of Brent, London, England
- Education: St John's College, Cambridge (BA); University of Sussex (DPhil)
- Occupation: Academic
- Known for: Research on language acquisition, children’s drawings, social identity, intergroup relations, civic engagement, intercultural education, citizenship education

Martyn David Barrett (born 18 June 1951) is a British social scientist. He was educated at the St John's College, Cambridge and the University of Sussex, and originally specialised in developmental psychology. He taught at Roehampton Institute of Higher Education (1978-1987), Royal Holloway and Bedford New College, University of London (1987-1993) and the University of Surrey (1993-2012). Since 2012, he has held the position of Emeritus Professor of Psychology at the University of Surrey.

== Academic career ==
Barrett began his academic career by studying Experimental Psychology as part of the Natural Science Tripos at the University of Cambridge (1970-1973). He subsequently conducted his doctoral research at the University of Sussex (1974-1979), focusing on language acquisition, including semantic development, pragmatic development and holophrasis (sentence words). He later published several books on the development of language in children.

In a secondary line of research, Barrett also worked on the development of children’s drawings, work that began with his undergraduate research project which was published in 1976. He subsequently researched the effects that verbal instructions have on the form and content of children’s drawings, the sequential developmental changes that occur in children's drawings of the human figure, and the impact of affective characterisations of topics to be drawn on the use of form and colour in children’s drawings.

In the early 1990s, Barrett began to work on the development of children's national identity, ethnic identity, the development of national, ethnic and racial attitudes and prejudice in children and adolescents, and at a later date he also started to work on the development of civic engagement and political participation in youth, ethnic minorities and migrants. He led three multinational research projects on these topics funded by the European Commission: Children’s Beliefs and Feelings about their Own and Other National Groups in Europe, The Development of National, Ethnolinguistic and Religious Identity in Children and Adolescents living in the New Independent States of the former Soviet Union, and Processes Influencing Democratic Ownership and Participation (PIDOP).

=== Applying research to educational policy and practice ===
Since 2006, Barrett has been a consultant for the Council of Europe. In this role, he has participated in a number of intercultural education and citizenship education projects, including: developing the Autobiography of Intercultural Encounters; editing a book examining the similarities and the differences between interculturalism and multiculturalism; co-authoring a statement paper on Developing Intercultural Competence through Education; leading the development of the Reference Framework of Competences for Democratic Culture; and acting as the lead expert on assessment for the Education Policy Advisers Network.

Of these various activities undertaken by Barrett, the development of the Reference Framework of Competences for Democratic Culture (RFCDC) has had political and policy impact in the member states of the Council of Europe, due to the fact that it was endorsed unanimously by the Ministers of Education of the member states at their standing conference, which was took place in Brussels in April 2016. The RFCDC offers detailed information about the democratic and intercultural competences that should be promoted in school students through formal education, and it also provides detailed guidance to education policymakers and practitioners on how to harness curriculum design, pedagogical methods, assessment practices, teacher education, and the use of a whole-school approach, in order to promote the democratic and intercultural competences of school students. The Council of Europe’s Education Policy Advisers Network was established in 2018 to help education authorities in the member states implement the RFCDC in their national education systems. By 2022, the Framework was being implemented either in whole or in part in the education systems of 22 member states of the Council of Europe.

Barrett has also worked for the Organisation for Economic Co-operation and Development (OECD), helping to design the global competence assessments for use in PISA 2018. In addition, since 2023, he has served as a Trustee for AFS Intercultural Programs (an international non-profit organisation that provides a wide range of educational programs designed to promote the active global citizenship of participants). As a Trustee, he has particular responsibility for overseeing AFS’s research and assessment agenda.

In 2022, Barrett was awarded an Honorary Doctorate of Psychology by the University of Chichester, in recognition of his contributions to the education of children and young people.
