= The Stag (magazine) =

University of Surrey student magazine

- Type: Student newspaper
- Format: Magazine
- Owner: University of Surrey Students Union
- Editor-in-chief: Madi Holland
- Founded: 1967 (as Bare Facts)
- Headquarters: University of Surrey
- Website: thestagmagazine.com

The Stag is a student magazine published by students of the University of Surrey online and in print.

== History ==
The newspaper was established under the name Bare Facts in 1967. In 1968, the university was to move from its home in Battersea Park, South-West London, to Stag Hill, in Guildford, Surrey. Concerns were raised at a lunchtime Students Union meeting over troubles in communication between the students on each site while the move was in progress. Outgoing Union President, Bob Matthews, suggested a one-page newsletter covering both campuses, which would carry messages by clubs and societies, as well as general notices from the students' union. The first few hundred issues were usually edited by the Union Executive, before an annual editor was appointed.

The last edition published under the name Bare Facts was in September 2008. Then-editor chose to rebrand the newspaper as The Stag. In 2015 The Stag became a monthly magazine. In 2016 the University of Surrey Students' Union's board of trustees voted in favour of changing The Stag from a 'core union function' to a society.

Each year, with each change of committee, the logo and cover layout of the magazine have changed.

Writers for The Stag have also contributed under this title to other Guildford and Surrey publications, contributing from a student perspective and with comments on university life.

In 2018 the committee decided to revive the website and make it an active, integral part of the magazine's functioning by publishing a new article at least once a week.

As of 2022, there are nine sections of the magazine, mostly run by individual section Editors. These are: Features, Culture, Sport, Opinion, Science & Technology, News, Politics, Sustainability and Societies. The Societies section was introduced by then Treasurer, Luka Dehnbostel, in 2022 to showcase the other societies at the University of Surrey in an effort to rebuild in person engagement after the Covid-19 pandemic reduced attendance in society events.

== Awards ==
Bare Facts won several notable awards, including the National Student Journalism Awards in 2002 and 2003 for Best Student Campaign. The 2002 campaign related to increases in campus rent, whilst the 2003 "Lights, Camera, Action" campaign related to student safety on and near campus.

In 2017, The Stag, now a magazine, was shortlisted for the 'Best Design (Magazine)' by the National Student Publication Association.

In 2019, The Stag magazine won Most Improved Society at the Union Ball Awards after developing an active website and collaborating with the Students' Union on the 2019 Varsity programme.

In 2023, The Stag magazine was shortlisted and was Highly Commended for 'Best Creative Piece' by the National Student Publication Association in addition to winning Most Improved Society at the Union Ball Awards. Both awards possible due to the committee's tireless efforts to revive and grow the society after facing extinction due to the Covid-19 pandemic under the leadership of Luka Dehnbostel, Rosie Willoughby and Luana Vasconcelos.
