= Strained quantum-well laser =

A strained quantum well laser is a type of quantum-well laser, which was invented by Professor Alf Adams at the University of Surrey in 1986. The laser is distinctive for producing a more concentrated beam than other quantum well lasers, making it considerably more efficient. The lasers are notable for usage in CD, DVD, and Blu-Ray drives as well as applications in supermarket barcode readers and telephone optical transmission.
