= Dance and Drama Awards =

The Dance and Drama Awards are scholarships awarded to students to subsidise professional vocational training at performing arts schools in the United Kingdom. Established in 1998, the awards are funded by the British Government through the Learning and Skills Council and are awarded to selected students at 21 performing arts schools.

== Overview ==
Dance and Drama Awards are offered to selected students who are commencing training at the 21 specialist vocational schools chosen for the scholarship scheme. Through a process of auditions, the awarding school identifies talented students and allocates awards. The award pays a substantial contribution towards the cost of attending arts training courses and, in many cases, also includes a means tested maintenance grant.

== Courses ==
The vocational courses for which the awards are given are devised by Trinity College, London and, upon completion, provide a professional level qualification at either Level 5 or Level 6 on the National Qualifications Framework. Completion of one of these courses gives formal accreditation of the skills, knowledge and understanding that are acquired in training for employment as a professional actor, dancer, performing artist or in production roles supporting performance. Although the courses are offered as post-16 further education, the qualifications are rated at graduate level.

Courses eligible for funding:

National Qualifications Framework – Level 5

- National Certificate in Professional Acting
- National Certificate in Professional Classical Ballet

National Qualifications Framework – Level 6

- National Diploma in Professional Acting
- National Diploma in Professional Musical Theatre
- National Diploma in Professional Dance
- National Diploma in Professional Production Skills

== Schools ==
All the schools that participate in the Dance and Drama Awards scheme are validated by Trinity College and are inspected for educational standards by OFSTED.

Schools validated to provide the qualifications:

- Academy of Live and Recorded Arts
- ArtsEd, London
- Tring Park School for the Performing Arts
- Bird College of Dance, Music & Theatre Performance
- Cambridge Performing Arts at Bodywork
- Drama Studio London
- Elmhurst Ballet School
- English National Ballet School
- GSA Conservatoire
- The Hammond School
- Italia Conti Academy of Theatre Arts
- Laine Theatre Arts
- Liverpool Theatre School and College
- Millennium Dance 2000
- Mountview Academy of Theatre Arts
- Northern Ballet School
- Oxford School of Drama
- Performers College
- SLP College Leeds
- Stella Mann College
- Urdang Academy

== Eligibility ==
There are no prerequisites for receiving a Dance and Drama Award. They are awarded based solely on auditions, and are not subject to means testing. Recipients must be between the ages of 16 and 23 and must have been resident in the United Kingdom or the European Union for a minimum of 3 years prior to the commencement of the course.

== Notable recipients ==
- Connie Fisher, winner of BBC1 talent show How Do You Solve a Problem Like Maria?
- Dominic Burgess, stage and television actor
- Ryan J. Brown, actor and screenwriter
