= Stella Mann College of Performing Arts =

Private performing arts school in Bedford, England

Coordinates: 52.141°N 0.480°W

Stella Mann College
- Type: Performing Arts
- Established: 1946
- Principal: Mary Breen
- Location: Bedford, Bedfordshire; England
- Website: stellamanncollege.co.uk

The Stella Mann College of Performing Arts is an independent, co-educational performing arts school and college specialising in dance and musical theatre. The college is located in the Harpur area of Bedford, Bedfordshire, England.

== Overview ==
Founded by the dance teacher Stella Mann (24 January 1912 – 5 January 2013) in 1946, the college began as dance school located in Hampstead, London. In 2003, the college moved to its present location in Bedford in a building previously occupied by Middlesex University.

Stella Mann College provides vocational training in dance and musical theatre. The college prepares students for a career in the performing arts and has a history of feeding artists into West End theatre and dance companies.

Key areas of study include classical ballet, tap, jazz and contemporary dance, singing and drama. Candidates who complete the course are awarded either the National Diploma in Professional Dance or the National Diploma in Professional Musical Theatre. The college is accredited to the Council for Dance Education and Training and its qualifications are accredited by Trinity College, London. Both qualifications are rated at Level 6 on the National Qualifications Framework and despite being classed as further education, are equivalent to higher education courses such as an undergraduate degree.

The college is one of the 21 schools selected to allocate Dance and Drama Awards, a government funded scholarship scheme to subsidise vocational performing arts training. The college is an approved centre of the Imperial Society of Teachers of Dancing and students have the option to study for nationally recognised dance teaching qualifications with the organisation.

Alongside its professional training, the college operates a part-time lower school, which teaches dance and theatre skills to children of pre-vocational age. Children are prepared for examinations with the Imperial Society of Teachers of Dancing and take part in productions.

== Notable former students ==
- Tobias Mead, dancer, Dirty Dancing: The Time of Your Life, Britain's Got Talent
- Janet Montgomery, actress, Skins, Wrong Turn 3
