= Bush Davies School of Theatre Arts =

Location
- United Kingdom
- Coordinates: 51.1464°N 0.0178°W

Information
- Type: Independent
- Established: 1914
- Founder: Pauline Bush
- Closed: 1989
- Specialist: Dance/Performing Arts
- Website: http://www.bush-davies.com

Bush Davies School of Theatre Arts was a dance and performing arts school in the United Kingdom. Founded by the dance teacher Pauline Bush in Nottingham in 1914, and later with branches in Romford, Essex and London; it was bombed out during World War II and then moved to a former boys' school East Grinstead. The Romford branch closed in 1974 and the East Grinstead branch in 1989. After Pauline Bush's death, the school was run by her daughter Noreen and her husband Victor Leopold. Later their son Paul Kimm joined them, and he remained Principal until the school closed.

== Productions ==
In May 1959, Marjorie Davies produced and directed the musical "What Katy Did" by Jo Masters, which starred students of the Bush Davies School with Pat Goh as Katy.

In 1974, Susan Passmore and Raymond Bishop produced the annual July performance 'Time Steps' in celebration of the school's Diamond Jubilee in the Adeline Genee Theatre. The 330-seat theatre opened in 1967 on land gifted by the school with a performance of Coppelia. The school staged an annual production each summer. The theatre was demolished by the owners of the residential care home that now operates in Charters Towers and the grounds of the old school.

== Notable students ==
- Holly Aird, actress
- Fairuza Balk, actress
- Doreen Bird, founder of Bird College
- Warren Carlyle, choreographer
- Judy Carne, actress
- Lauren Christy, singer-songwriter and producer
- Gemma Craven, actress
- Suzanne Danielle, actress
- Louise Fribo, actress
- Francesca Jaynes, choreographer
- Betty Laine, dancer and founder of Laine Theatre Arts
- Jane Leeves, Daphne Moon in Frasier
- Lisa Kay, Actress & Voiceover Artist
- Fiona Mollison, actress
- John Partridge, actor and dancer
- Philip Pegler, President & CEO (Formula KFX)
- Natalie Roles, actress
- Saffron (singer), singer, dancer and actress
- Simon Shelton, Dancer & Actor (Tinky Winky)
- Polly Walker, television and film actress
- Doreen Wells, ballet dancer
- Lorna Yabsley, actress and photographer
