= Elle Darlington =

Welsh singer-songwriter

- Born: Elle Darlington
- Origin: Prestatyn, Wales, UK
- Genres: Pop, R&B
- Occupation: Singer-songwriter
- Instrument: Vocals
- Years active: 2020–present
- Labels: Columbia Records, Independent
- Website: elledarlington.com Instagram

Elle Darlington is a Welsh-Chilean singer-songwriter. She rose to prominence through covers on TikTok, garnering more than 1 million followers. She has been included in People magazine's list of emerging artists and Rolling Stone's list of pop stars to watch.

== Life and career ==
Elle Darlington was born and raised in Prestatyn, Wales. Her father's side is from Chile. Drawing inspiration from the voices of Beyoncé, Brandy and Mariah Carey, as well as the show Hannah Montana, Darlington began taking voice lessons at the age of five. At the encouragement of a college tutor, she started posting singing videos on TikTok and YouTube at the age of 16 and has cited her "Hopelessly Devoted to You" cover as one of her first to go viral. She temporarily studied voice at the Brighton Institute of Modern Music in Manchester until the 2020 COVID-19 pandemic sent her back home to Wales, prompting her to focus on growing her TikTok following. At the age of 17, she moved to London to pursue her music career.

On 27 October 2023, Darlington released her debut single, "Wish You Would", through Columbia Records. In November 2023, she was included in People magazine's list of emerging artists, in which the writers commented on the "catchy melodies and whistle tones reminiscent of Mariah Carey" in "Wish You Would". The following week she released her second single, "Christmas Is You", which was included in Atwood Magazine's list of 'Best New Holiday Songs' in 2023 and Parade magazine's list of 'Best New-ish Christmas Tunes' in both 2024 and 2025. In January 2024, Rolling Stone magazine featured her in their list of pop stars to watch.

Darlington's first release of 2024 was "Hiatus", about desiring distance and recovering from a recent breakup. She wrote about a similar topic in her 17 May 2024 release, "Feel It All", prompting numerous TikTok followers to message her about how they find solace in her music. A few days later she performed at The Great Escape Festival, a performance that DMY magazine called "North Wales’ answer to Ariana Grande". On 16 August 2024, she released "Summer Crush", which Rolling Stone listed as a song you need to know.

On 24 October 2025, Darlington independently released her first EP, "Bad Bitch in Love".

== Musical style ==
Darlington's music has largely been labelled a blend of pop and R&B that is reminiscent of the 1990s/2000s, as well as noted for elements of funk and soul. Her vocals have been dubbed both dreamy and powerhouse, with Rolling Stone remarking on her "ability to wrap vocals at the very top of the scale". She credits Mariah Carey and Ariana Grande as her greatest musical influences, which many publications have noticed in her sound.

== Discography ==
=== Singles ===
- "wish you would " (2023)
- "christmas is you " (2023)
- "hiatus " (2024)
- "feel it all " (2024)
- "one more night " (2024)
- "summer crush " (2024)
- "fallin " (2025)
