= Performers College =

- Birmingham; Brighton; Essex; Manchester; England

Information
- Type: Specialist performing arts college
- Specialist: Musical Theatre and Dance
- Dean: Dr John Harrison
- Heads of School: Jennifer Mitchell (Birmingham); Sarah Mullan (Brighton); Emma Rogers (Essex); Sally Crawford-Shepherd (Manchester)
- Gender: Coeducational
- Age: 16+
- Website: https://performerscollege.ac.uk

Performers College is a specialist performing arts college and part of BIMM University, operating across four campuses in Birmingham, Brighton, Essex, and Manchester. The college provides vocational training in dance and musical theatre.

== Overview ==
Performers College is a specialist performing arts college and part of BIMM University, operating across four campuses in Birmingham, Brighton, Essex, and Manchester. The college provides vocational training in dance and musical theatre.

Key areas of study include ballet, tap, jazz, and contemporary dance, singing, drama, and theatre production. The college offers three-year BA (Hons) degree courses in Acting, Musical Theatre, and Dance, validated by BIMM University. Professional diplomas validated by Trinity College, London are offered in Musical Theatre and Dance, and Professional Dance. Postgraduate MA programmes in Choreography, Professional Performance, and Theatre Directing are also available.

These professional diplomas are further education qualifications placed at Level 6 on the National Qualifications Framework.

Performers College has a history of graduates working in West End theatre, dance companies, and other areas of the entertainment industry. It is one of 21 schools selected to allocate Dance and Drama Awards, a government-funded scholarship scheme to subsidise the cost of professional dance, drama, and musical theatre training at leading institutions.

The college is an approved centre for the Imperial Society of Teachers of Dancing and is authorised to offer nationally recognised qualifications in dance teaching. The college is accredited by the Council for Dance Education & Training and is inspected by Ofsted as part of its role as a provider of Dance and Drama Awards.

== History ==
In 1988 Performers College was founded in Essex.

In 2019 Performers College became part of BIMM University.

In 2021 Performers College announced the opening of a second campus in Birmingham.

In 2024 Performers College merged with the Institute for Contemporary Theatre, expanding into Brighton and Manchester.

== See also ==
- Imperial Society of Teachers of Dancing
- Dance and Drama Awards
- Trinity College, London
