= SLP College =

Performing arts college in West Yorkshire, England

Location
- 5 Chapel Lane; Garforth, West Yorkshire, LS25 1AG; England; 53.7953°N 1.3878°W

Information
- Type: Independent FE college
- Established: 1974
- Founder: Sandra Reid
- Ofsted: Reports
- Joint principals: Kirsty Sparks & James McCullagh
- Gender: Coeducational
- Age: 16+
- Course: Professional Performing Arts Diplomas in Dance & Musical Theatre
- Validation: Trinity College, London
- Accreditation: Council for Dance, Drama and Musical Theatre
- Website: www.slpcollege.co.uk

SLP College is an independent, co-educational performing arts college based in Garforth near Leeds, West Yorkshire, England.

== Overview ==
In 1974 Sandra A. Reid founded 'Sandra A Reid, School of Ballet and Theatre Dance' It initially offered classes for young children and was held in a small church hall before Reid purchased the first Studio La Pointe premises in around 1983. 'Studios La Pointe', was the predecessor of today's SLP College. Initially, it was a part-time dance school teaching children of pre-vocational age. In 1991, the studios moved to a former chapel closer to the centre of Garforth, and a full-time performing arts course was established, which became known as SLP College. It is accredited to the Council for Dance Education and Training, and is one of the 21 specialist performing arts schools selected to allocate government funded Dance and Drama Awards. The college is based in a converted chapel, which has been extended twice in 2005 and in 2008.

After 30 years at the helm, Reid retired as principal of the college in the summer of 2021; head of dance Kirsty Sparks and director of music James McCullagh now share the position as joint principals. Reid remains in post as CEO.

== Training ==
SLP College is one of a limited number of schools authorised to offer the National Diploma in Professional Musical Theatre, a three-year further education qualification devised and validated by Trinity College, London. The course is designed to develop practical skill rather than academic learning and so the qualification is rated at Level 6 on the National Qualifications Framework and is equal to some higher education degrees. Key areas of study include classical ballet, tap, jazz and contemporary dance, singing and drama as well as contextual studies such as music appreciation and musical theatre history.

Past students include Verity Rushworth.
