= National College of Music =

British Examinations board

- Formation: 1894
- Type: Examination Board
- Headquarters: London, United Kingdom
- Official language: English
- Principal: Dr Elizabeth Stratford
- Website: Official Website

The National College of Music is an examination board established in 1894 and based in London, United Kingdom, offering external grade examinations in Music, Speech and Drama in the UK and overseas.

== History ==
The National College of Music was established as a school of music in 1894 by William J. Moss, the Moss family and several of their friends and patrons, and was later incorporated in 1898. Currently, it has a number of Examination Centres in the United Kingdom as well as several overseas in Europe, Australia and Malaysia.

== Medal Examinations ==
The College's Medal Examinations (Bronze, Silver and Gold) are offered for many musical instruments, including violin, cello, clarinet, flute, piano and others.

== Diplomas ==
The College's range of Diplomas, offered in Music, Speech and Drama, comprise the following levels:

- Diploma of the National College of Music (Dip.NCM)
- Associate of the National College of Music (ANCM)
- Licentiate of the National College of Music (LNCM)
- Fellow of the National College of Music (FNCM)

== Fellowships ==
The College's Associate and Honorary Fellowships are awarded to professional musicians, conductors, choral directors, recitalists, composers, musicologists and those who have made an outstanding contribution to Music and to music education.
