= BIRD Conservatoire =

- thumb

Location
- Alma Road; Sidcup, London, DA14 4ED; England; 51.428467°N 0.105655°E

Information
- Type: Independent further and higher education college
- Motto: Passionate About Performance
- Established: 1946
- Founder: Doreen Bird
- Local authority: London Borough of Bexley
- Department for Education URN: 50701 Tables
- Ofsted: Reports
- President: Stephen Mear
- Chair: Geoff Pine
- Principal / CEO: Christopher Costigan
- Staff: 130
- Gender: Mixed
- Website: birdcollege.co.uk

BIRD Conservatoire is an independent performing arts college, located in Sidcup, South East London, in the London Borough of Bexley.

The college was founded as a dance school by Doreen Bird in 1946 and now provides specialist vocational training in dance and musical theatre, at further and higher education level. The college is one of many providers of vocational performing arts training in the United Kingdom. In addition, the college also receives a grant from Bexley Council to provide music services to schools in the borough.

The college prepares students for a professional career in the performing arts and has a reputation of feeding artists into West End and Broadway theatre, dance companies, television, film, pop music and other high-profile areas of the entertainments industry. Key areas of study include ballet, tap, jazz and contemporary dance, musical theatre, singing, voice and acting.

BIRD Conservatoire is an accredited college of the Council for Dance Education and Training. Full-time students at the college study for either the BA Hons in Professional Dance and Musical Theatre or BA Hons in Professional Dance and Performance, validated by the University of Greenwich. The college is also an approved dance centre of the Imperial Society of Teachers of Dancing (ISTD), and students can study towards the ISTD dance teaching qualifications.

== History ==
=== Overview ===
Doreen Bird first founded the Doreen Bird School of Dance in Sidcup in 1946. This was the predecessor of today's BIRD Conservatoire. Bird initially taught pupils in her parents' living room, rolling up the carpet to provide a suitable dance surface, although she later used a local church hall. In 1951, she established a full-time performing arts course with six students, which became known as the Doreen Bird College of Performing Arts.

In 1954 Doreen Bird acquired a former vicarage, which was renamed Vicarage House and would be the college's first permanent premises. In 1964, it moved to Studio House, which continued in daily use by the college until 2016. To enable the college to expand, it became necessary to seek larger premises and in 1979, Bird was successful in securing the freehold of a former Victorian school, which was converted into dance studios and was renamed Birkbeck Centre. Birkbeck Centre was officially opened by former Prime Minister, Sir Edward Heath and was the college's main campus until 2007. In 2007, as part of the college's contract to provide pre-vocational music and dance services on behalf of Bexley Council, BIRD Conservatoire was granted residency of the former Bexley Centre for Music & Dance, which became the college's principal campus, renamed The Centre. The college vacated all of its existing buildings early in 2016, with the acquisition of a new one-site facility on Alma Road in Sidcup.

The Doreen Bird College of Performing Arts first offered a nationally recognised qualification with the introduction of a National Diploma validated by Trinity College. In 1997, the Conservatoire became the first of its kind in the United Kingdom to offer a professional dance degree, with the introduction of the BA Hons Degree in Dance & Theatre Performance. This course was specially devised for the college as a collaboration between Doreen Bird and the University of Greenwich who validate the qualification. In 2004, the National Diploma course was regraded to Level 6 on the National Qualifications Framework, becoming the National Diploma in Professional Musical Theatre. The college further expanded its range of courses with the introduction of the Foundation Degree in Creative Industries: Acting and the MA by Research in Dance & Theatre Performance, both validated by the University of Greenwich. A one-year pre-vocational foundation course was also established, which offered an intensive course of study for students who needed extra preparation before applying for a place on a full professional course.

Doreen Bird was principal of the Doreen Bird College of Performing Arts until her retirement in 1998, when she appointed Sue Passmore as Principal and Executive Director. It is also around this time that the name Bird College was first introduced, replacing the full title that had previously been used. Doreen Bird continued to be a trustee and Governor of the college for the rest of her life and in 1999 she was awarded an honorary Master of Arts by the University of Greenwich, in recognition of her achievements. She died on 4 February 2004 and a memorial service was held at The Actor's Church in Covent Garden.

Before becoming Principal of the college in 1998, Sue Passmore had previously been Head of Theatre at the former Bush Davies School of Theatre Arts. She joined the Doreen Bird College of Performing Arts in 1988, as Artistic Co-ordinator and Head of Drama, becoming Artistic Director in 1989. She founded the Bird Theatre Company in 1991 and was also appointed to the Executive Council of the Imperial Society of Teachers of Dancing. After becoming the college's Principal and Executive Director in 1998, she held the post for seven years. Passmore retired from BIRD in 2005.

From 2005, the college was managed by Shirley Coen as Principal & Chief Executive and Luis Abreu as Deputy Principal. De Abreu is an alumnus of the college, serving as Deputy CEO & Artistic Director but formerly he was Head of Acting and Head of Performance Studies. In 2019 De Abreu became Joint Principal with Coen and in 2022 he became Principal and Artistic Director. Coen and De Abreu were both trustees of the Doreen Bird Foundation and retired from their positions in December 2024.

In 2007 till 2021, Bird College became the providers of pre-vocational music and dance services for the London Borough of Bexley, working in partnership with Bexley Council.

In January 2025, Christopher Costigan was appointed as Principal/CEO of the newly renamed BIRD Conservatoire.

=== Productions ===
Live performances are an integral part of the curriculum, with students receiving performance opportunities throughout their training at the in-house Doreen Bird Foundation Theatre. The college used to perform in public under the title of 'Bird Theatre Company', staging productions both in the UK and Internationally.

BIRD productions have been staged at the Whitworth Theatre, the Bloomsbury Theatre, the Churchill Theatre in Bromley, the Peacock Theatre, the Shaw Theatre, Sadler's Wells, the Royal Opera House and the Orchard Theatre in Dartford.

BIRD Conservatoire takes part in the annual event, 'MOVE IT'. BIRD students perform in the showcase and give demonstrations, with staff of the college teaching workshops and giving lectures.

=== Examinations ===
- ISTD

== Facilities ==
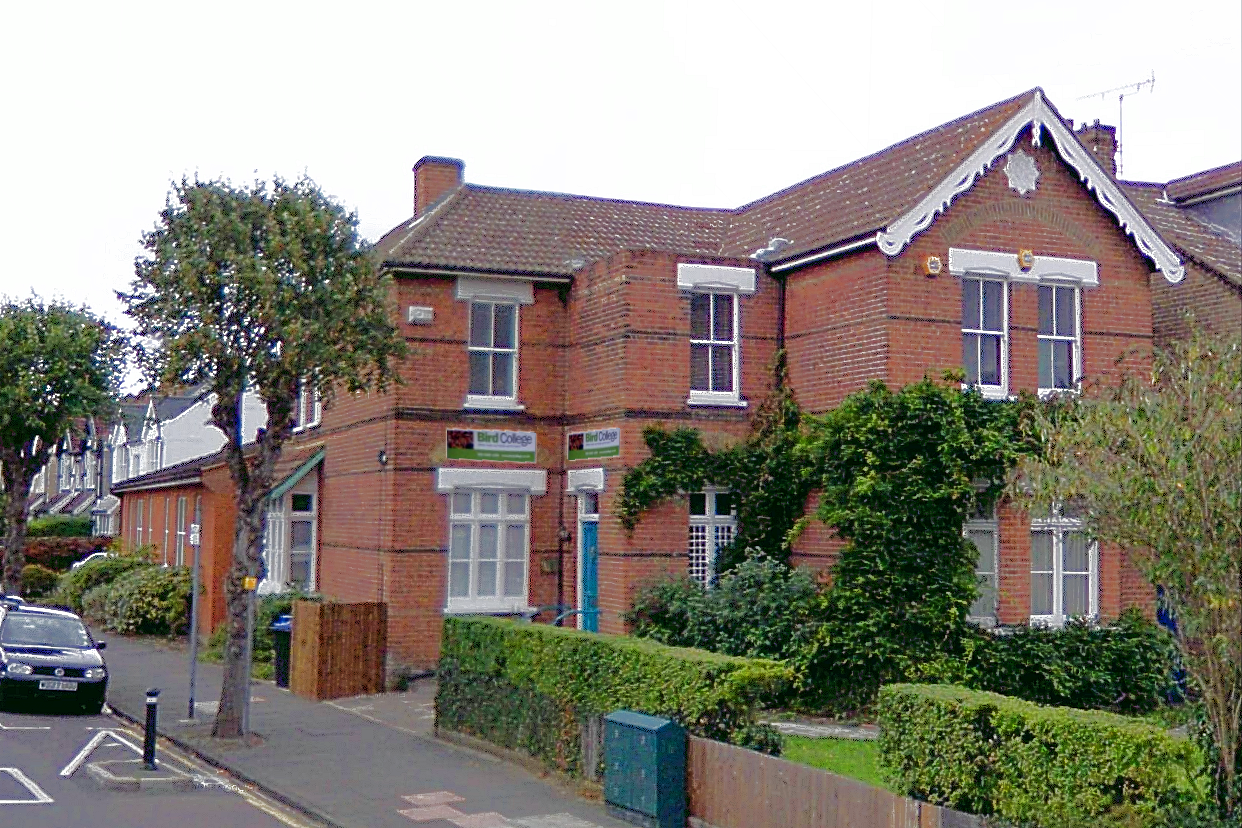
Studio House

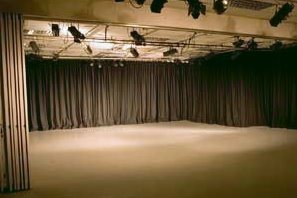
In house theatre facility at Studio House

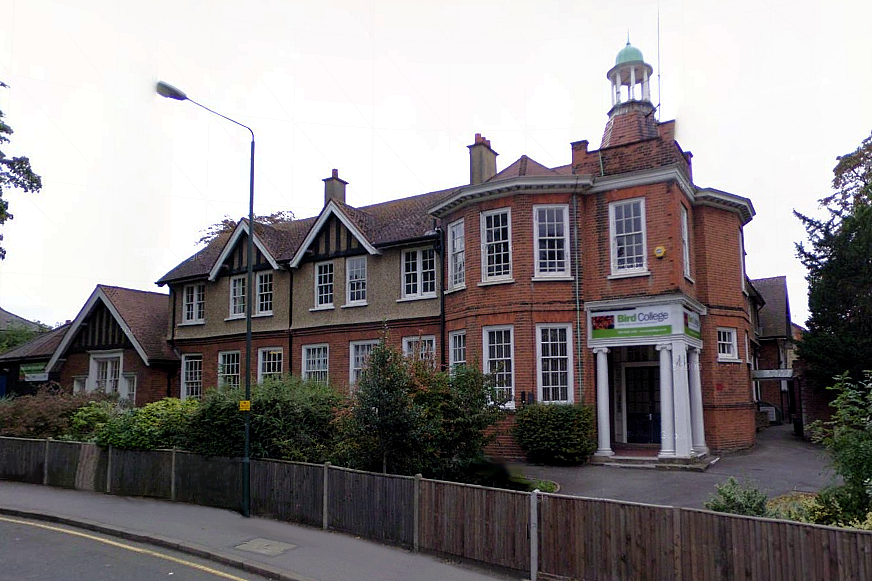
The Centre

=== Alma Road ===
In November 2016, BIRD moved to its new campus on Alma Road in Sidcup, bringing all of the college's facilities onto one site for the first time. The Alma Road site was originally built as the Sidcup Secondary School (1955–1965), with two matching adjacent buildings; one for girls and one for boys. One of these buildings now houses Birkbeck Primary School. The second, which now houses BIRD Conservatoire, was used as the Sidcup Adult Education Centre prior to its acquisition by BIRD Conservatoire. An architectural competition was launched by the Royal Institute of British Architects in the autumn of 2011, with the design brief for a complete overhaul of the site, providing state of the art facilities for the college. The winning designs were submitted by Hoskins Architects of Glasgow, work started in 2015. The college took partial residence of the building in the autumn of 2015 and almost full residence in November 2016.

=== Former ===
From 1965 onward the Conservatoire was based at Studio House, a detached Georgian property occupying the corner plot of Station Road and Crescent Road in Sidcup. Originally a residential property, the ground floor reception rooms were used as dance studios until the 1990s, when a large studio/theatre extension was built on what was the rear garden. Studio House was the college's principal campus until the acquisition of Birkbeck Centre in the 1970s.

Birkbeck Centre was a former Victorian school situated on the corner of Birkbeck Road and Clarence Crescent in Sidcup. Acquired for the college in 1977, it was extensively refurbished and re-opened by Prime Minister and Bexley MP, Sir Edward Heath. Birkbeck Centre comprised a number of dance studios of different sizes, including a large studio located in a pre-fabricated building to the rear of the property. Adjacent to Birkbeck Centre was the Admin Cottage, which housed the college's administrative, marketing and finance teams, the Principal's office and a teachers rest room and kitchen. Birkbeck Centre remained the college's primary campus until 2007 when the college moved to 'The Centre' on Station Road.

Studio House, Birkbeck Centre and the Admin Cottage were sold in early 2016.

=== The Centre ===
The Centre BIRD's previous main site is a former school located on Station Road in Sidcup. It was a music and dance complex owned by the London Borough of Bexley and was previously known as the Bexley Academy of Music and Performing Arts. It was used primarily as a venue for pre-vocational dance and music training. When the College became the official approved provider for music provision in the London Borough of Bexley in 2007, BIRD Conservatoire took residency of the building and was responsible for the management of the site. The Centre offered (within the main building and annexes on site) a range of dance studios with sprung flooring and installed sound systems, tuition/practice rooms and performance opportunities in the larger studios.

== Notable students ==
- Helen Anker, actress, singer, and dancer
- Gary Avis, ballet dancer
- Linn Bjørnland, actor
- Warren Carlyle, director and choreographer
- Melanie C, singer and songwriter
- Sue Hodge, actress
- Gavin Lee, actor
- John Partridge, actor, dancer, singer, panelist and television presenter
- Lara Pulver, actress
- Aaron Sillis, dancer and choreographer
