= Lorna Yabsley =

British photographer

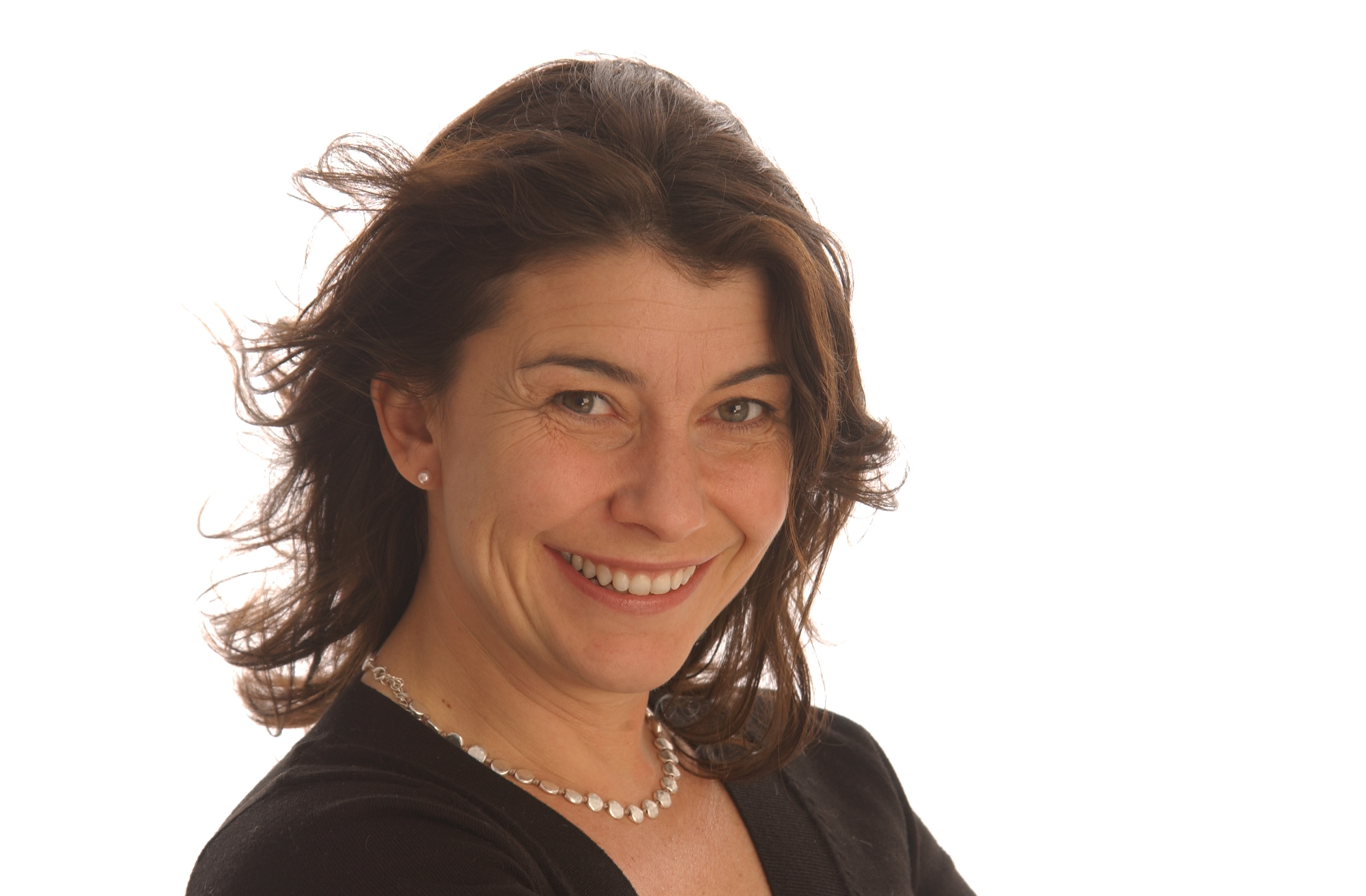
- Lorna Yabsley
- Born: 19 July 1964 (age 61); Salcombe, Devon
- Occupations: Actress, photographer, author
- Years active: 1978 - present
- Height: 5 ft 0 in (1.52 m)
- Children: Grace

Lorna Yabsley (born 19 July 1964) is a British former actress, photographer and author, who pioneered the "reportage" style of wedding photography during the early 1990s.

As a teenager she attended Bush Davies School of Theatre Arts in East Grinstead and Elmhurst School for Dance in Camberley, Surrey. She also spent much of this time acting in television dramas and serials. She starred in the Tales of the Unexpected episode "The Flypaper", which became a cult favourite. She adopted the stage name Lorna Charles in 1980, and starred alongside Brenda Blethyn and Harriet Walter in the Richard Eyre-directed Play for Today edition The Imitation Game.

Her career in photography started at the age of 18, when she began working as an assistant for landscape photographer Charlie Waite. Together they set up the specialist photo library Landscape Only.

== Bibliography ==
- Yabsley, Lorna – Dream Wedding Photography – publisher David and Charles May 2010 / ISBN 0-7153-3616-9 hardback ISBN 0-7153-3617-7 paperback
- Yabsley, Lorna – Introduction to Wedding Photography: A Guide to Photographing the Big Day – publisher David and Charles July 2012 / ISBN 978-1446302583 paperback
- Yabsley, Lorna – The Busy Girl's Guide to Digital Photography – publisher David and Charles October 2013 / ISBN 978-1446303160 paperback
- Yabsley, Lorna – Tate: The Photography Ideas Book (The Art Ideas Books) - publisher Ilex Press October 2019 / ISBN 978-1781576663 paperback

== Filmography (sometimes credited as Lorna Charles) ==
Year	Film	Role	Note
May 1978	The Devil's Crown	Alys	BBC The Hungry Falcons – Series 1 / Episode 4
August 1978	The Onedin Line		BBC The Reverend's Daughter – Series 6 / Episode 68
March 1979	My Son, My Son	Maeve O'Riorden (aged 10)	BBC
January 1980	Armchair Thriller	Sue Craig	Thames Television The Victim – Series 3 / Episode 1
April 1980	Play for Today	Anna Raine (as Lorna Charles)	BBC The Imitation Game – Series 10 / Episode 27
August 1980	Tales of the Unexpected	Sylvia Wilkinson	Anglia Television "The Flypaper" – Series 3 / Episode 1
October 1980	The Gentle Touch	Barbara (as Lorna Charles)	LWT Maggie's Luck – Series 2 / Episode 8
December 1980	The Mystery of the Disappearing Schoolgirls	Quarta (as Lorna Charles)	BBC
1981	The Day of the Triffids	Susan (as Lorna Charles)	BBC Series 1 / Episode 6
1985	Revolution	Uncredited	Goldcrest Films
