= Dancehouse =

Dance theatre in Manchester, England

Coordinates: 53°28′22″N 2°14′23″W

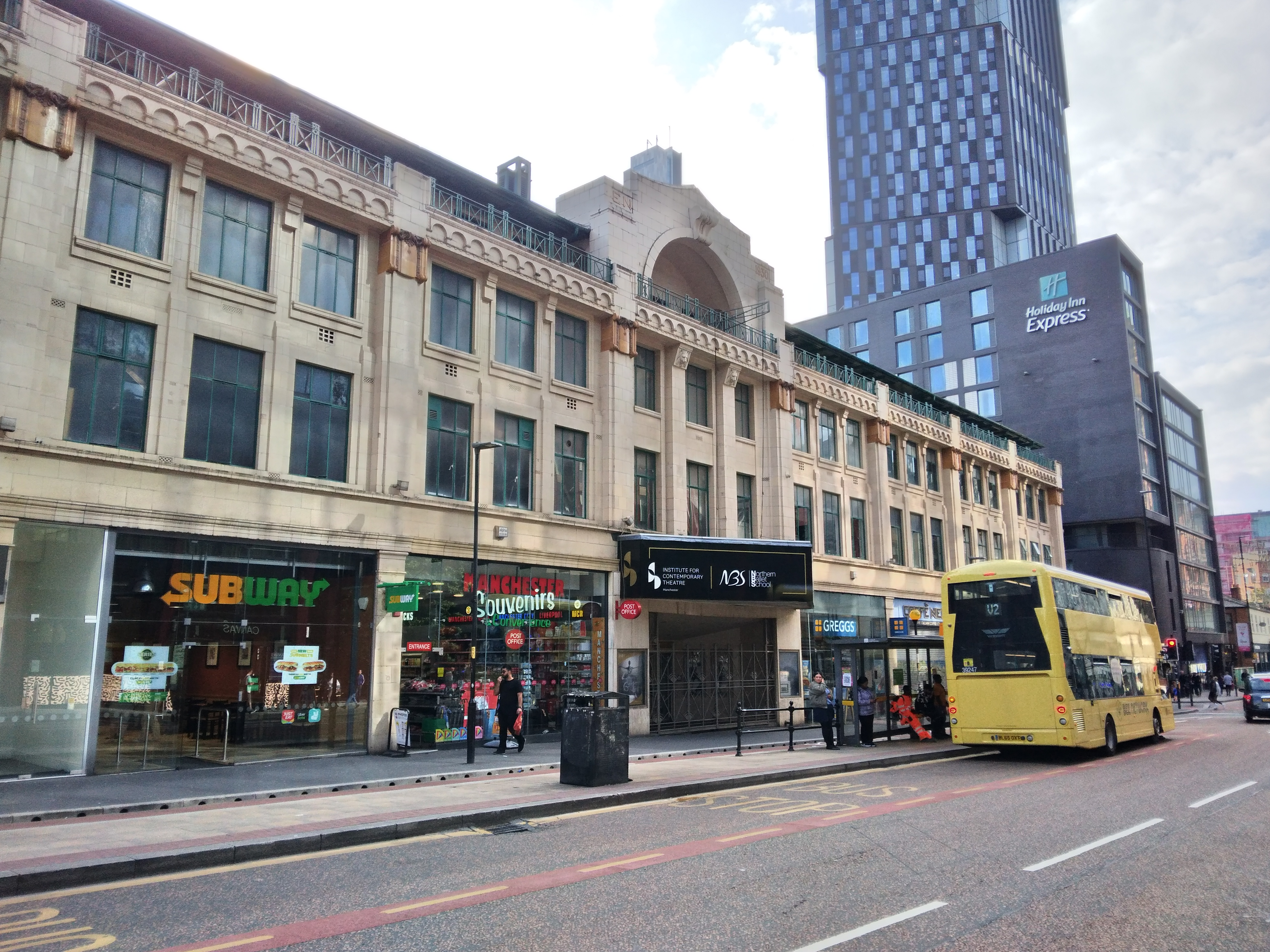
The Dancehouse Theatre, Manchester, with the tower of Artisan Heights in the background

The Dancehouse is a dance centre at 10 Oxford Road, Manchester, England. Formerly, the dance house was the Regal Cinema. It is home to Performers College Manchester and Northern Ballet School, both part of BIMM University.

== History and description ==
The building which now houses the Dancehouse Theatre, on Oxford Road, Manchester, was originally designed by Pendleton and Dickson for the property developer Emmanuel Nove, a Ukrainian who came to the city in the late 19th century. The building was built in 1929–30 originally containing two large meeting halls over a parade of shops. Before the interior of the halls was completed, they were converted into two cinemas (The Regal Twins) with fashionable 1930 Art Deco interiors, the world's first multiplex. These were converted, in 1972, to a five-screen complex (Studios 1 to 5) by Star Group, as the first five-cinema complex in Britain, before closing in the 1980s. Star Group also established Studios 6–9 in Deansgate.

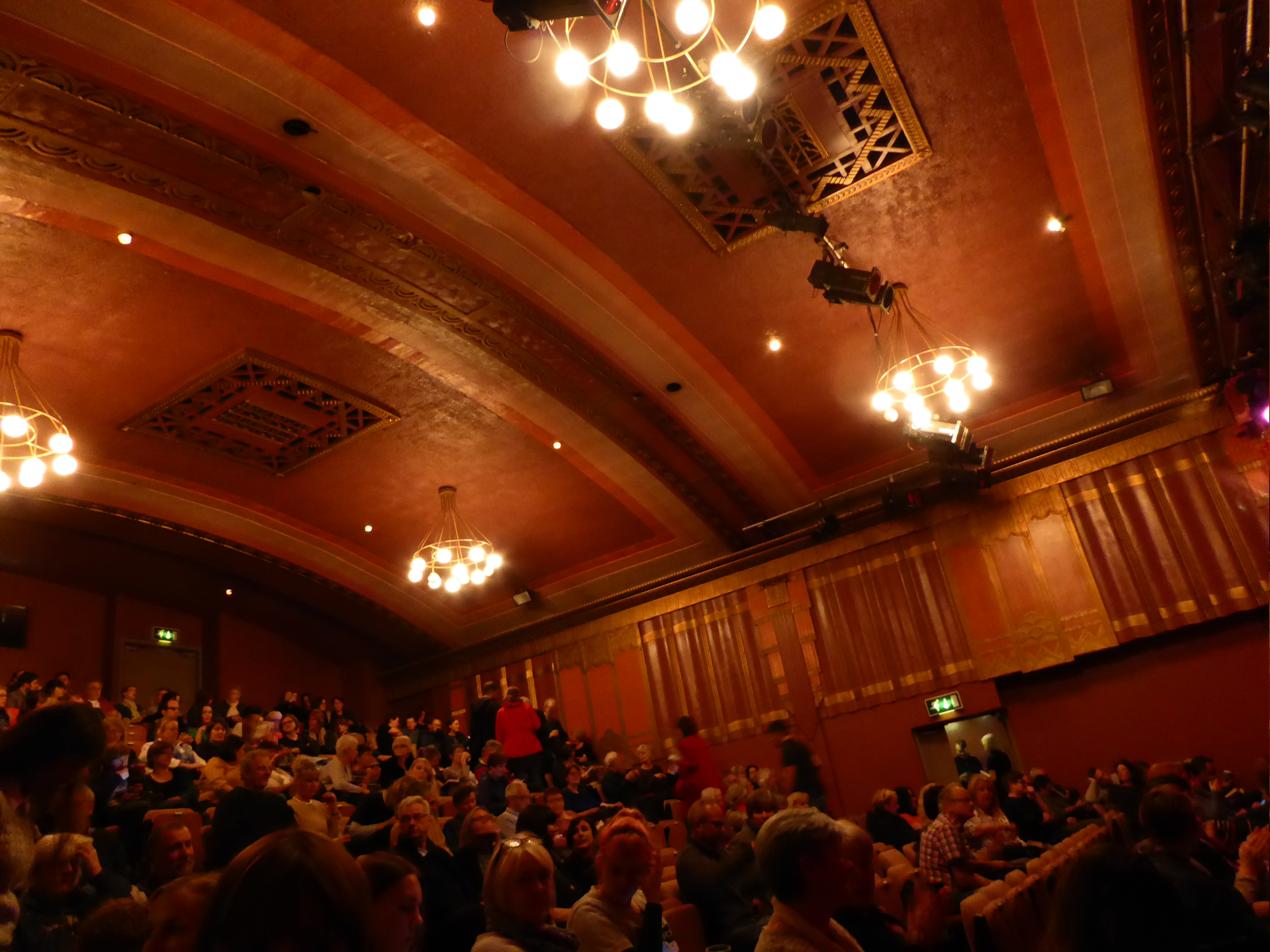
Dancehouse interior

A lease for the derelict property was obtained in 1990 by the Northern Ballet School, founded in 1977 by its principal Patricia McDonald, which, together with its sister company The Dancehouse Theatre, set about restoring the building to its former Art Deco splendour. One previously derelict 750-seat cinema was converted to create the 430-seat Dancehouse Theatre, officially opened in 1994 by Princess Margaret. The next four cinemas and other areas of the building were converted into the five dance studios and associated facilities that now house Performers College Manchester and Northern Ballet School. The Dancehouse Theatre complex extends to some 35,000 square feet (3,300 m^{2}) and comprises the theatre, three medium and two large dance studios, a green room, a café bar, theatre bar and coffee shop. The £500,000 cost of converting the theatre was largely met by donations from the Foundation for Sport and the Arts, the Arts Council of England and many other subscribers to the company's development programme.

== Trivia ==
Local band Elbow filmed the video to "Newborn" here. The theatre was supposed to be underwater so all extras were asked to wear blue.

== See also ==
- Listed buildings in Manchester-M1
