= John Partridge (actor) =

English actor and television presenter

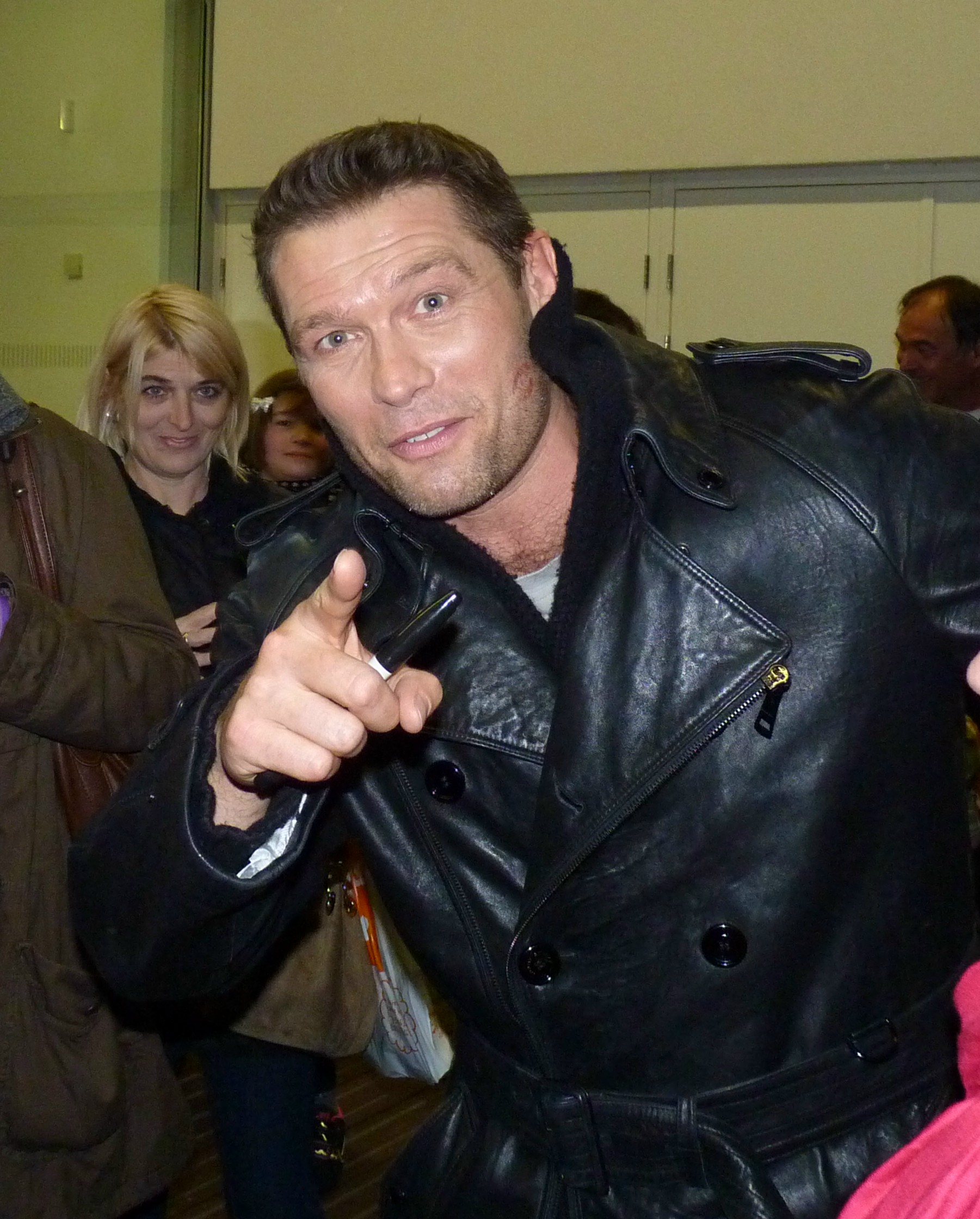
- John Partridge photographed in 2012
- Born: 24 July 1971 (age 55); Radcliffe, Lancashire, England
- Education: Royal Ballet School; Bush Davies School of Theatre Arts; Doreen Bird College of Performing Arts
- Occupations: Actor; dancer; singer; panelist; television presenter
- Years active: 1988–present
- Known for: EastEnders (2008–2012, 2014–2016); Over the Rainbow; Celebrity Big Brother (2016); Taking the Next Step
- Partner: Jon Tsouras (2011–present)

John Partridge (born 24 July 1971) (often referred to as simply The Parch) is an English actor, dancer, singer, panelist and television presenter, who is probably best known for the role of Christian Clarke in the long-running BBC television soap opera EastEnders, having joined the cast in January 2008. He has worked extensively as a singer and dancer in musical theatre, portraying Rum Tum Tugger in the official film production of Andrew Lloyd Webber's musical Cats.

== Professional career ==
Partridge initially had trained in ballet at the Royal Ballet Lower School, appearing in the television adaptation of Stan Barstow's novel A Kind of Loving in 1982. He went on to train in musical theatre at the Bush Davies School of Theatre Arts and Doreen Bird College of Performing Arts. He left college early at the age of 16, to join the cast of the original UK tour of Andrew Lloyd Webber's musical Cats.

Partridge joined the touring cast of Cats in 1988 and was dance captain from 1989 to 1990. He played the roles of Alonzo and Rumpus Cat and understudied the roles of Mr. Mistoffelees and Rum Tum Tugger. Later he joined the West End production of the show at the New London Theatre, playing the roles of Rum Tum Tugger and Munkustrap and in 1998, he appeared as Rum Tum Tugger in the official film production of the show, produced by Lloyd Webber and filmed at the Adelphi Theatre. Partridge later returned to the West End cast of the show prior to its closure in 2002 and has also appeared as Rum Tum Tugger in the German production in Düsseldorf.

Partridge's TV appearances include The Hot Shoe Show, a documentary called Aspects of Dancing, and BBC2 comedy Game On where he portrayed a predatory gay gym member attempting to chat up the sexually confused lead character Matthew. He has appeared in television commercials for Colgate Toothpaste and Cadbury's Twirl. He has also been a guest on daytime chat shows such as This Morning and Pebble Mill. From January 2008 to November 2012, Partridge was a permanent cast member of the BBC One soap opera, EastEnders playing the role of Christian Clarke, the gay brother of Jane Beale and was typically recognised as a member of the Beale family. His last appearance was on 15 November 2012. Partridge also worked as a choreographer on the show.

Partridge has worked with several rock and pop acts, including U2, Pet Shop Boys, Kim Wilde, Neneh Cherry, Pete Townshend, Mica Paris and Ultra Nate.

In 2010, Partridge, together with Sheila Hancock and Charlotte Church, was one of the judges for the new Andrew Lloyd Webber TV show Over The Rainbow, in search to find a young girl to play Dorothy in a new production of The Wizard of Oz. In April 2010, Partridge was a guest panellist on an episode of ITV's Celebrity Juice. In November 2010, Partridge was awarded the Entertainer of the Year award at the annual Stonewall Awards ceremony.

Since 2010, Partridge has presented the National Lottery and has co-presented the programme with Jenni Falconer since 2011. On 12 December 2010 he appeared on All Star Family Fortunes to raise money for the Terrence Higgins Trust but lost to Caroline Flack.

During Christmas and New Year of 2011 and 2012, Partridge starred as Prince Charming in the pantomime Cinderella at the Marlowe Theatre in Canterbury.

In July 2012, it was announced at a press launch that Partridge will be once again taking on the role of Prince Charming in Cinderella, this time at the Theatre Royal, Nottingham, which ran from 8 December 2012 until 13 January 2013.

On 7 September 2012, Partridge announced that he would be leaving EastEnders filming his final scenes two weeks later. Partridge briefly reprised the role in May 2014 for two episodes when his character attended the funeral of Lucy Beale. In January 2015, it was announced that Partridge will be reprising the role once again for a week-long stint to celebrate EastEnders 30th anniversary celebrations in February 2015.

Starting in February 2013, Partridge took on the role of Zach in the West End revival of A Chorus Line. It was announced that he would be appearing in Dames 'n' Dudes at the Hippodrome, London from 22 to 27 April 2013. He later appeared on Let's Dance for Comic Relief in 2013 with his co-stars to perform one of the numbers from A Chorus Line.

In August 2014, Partridge appeared in Tumble, a gymnastics reality show airing on BBC One. He became the third celebrity to leave the competition.

In September 2014, Partridge released his first album, entitled Dames, Dudes + Cowboys Too, an 11-song, 10-track album (10 official tracks, with an additional surprise song embedded in the final track). He held a launch party to promote the release of the album at The Borderline, a London club, on Wednesday 17 September 2014. In November 2015 it was announced that he will play Billy Flynn in the 2016 UK tour of Chicago.

In January 2016 it was announced that he would be taking part in the seventeenth series of Celebrity Big Brother. He left the house on 5 February having finished in sixth place.

In April 2016 Partridge said he was "thrilled" to be returning to EastEnders later that year.

In May 2018 it was announced that he would be appearing on Celebrity Masterchef later that year. He won the competition, beating Martin Bayfield and Spencer Matthews. Later that month, he appeared on Greatest Talent Show Moments, broadcast by Channel 5 to discuss the judging on Over The Rainbow. In June 2018, Partridge announced via Twitter that he would be joining the cast of The Case of the Frightened Lady.

In September 2018, it was announced that he would be appearing as King Rat in the pantomime Dick Whittington at the Theatre Royal, Plymouth.

From August 2019 to April 2020 Partridge appeared in the UK Tour of Cabaret, alongside Anita Harris and Kara Lily Hayworth.

Partridge appeared on a Netflix documentary, "Queen Cleopatra" as Julius Caesar, which aired in early May 2023.

In 2024/2025, he embarks on a solo tour across the UK. ‘Dancing Man’

On Friday, 01 May 2026, Partridge appeared as a contestant on BBC’s Celebrity Bridge of Lies, where he competed to win money for the charity Acting for Others.

== Personal life ==
Partridge is openly gay. He has been in a civil partnership since September 2011.

Partridge's mother suffered from Alzheimer's disease. In August 2014, he revealed he had lost four stone since 2012 due to the stress of seeing his mother develop the disease. Partridge has also cited this as the reason why he will not be returning to EastEnders, although he has briefly returned to EastEnders for two episodes in May 2014 and for a week for the show's anniversary celebrations in February 2015. He also made a brief return in summer 2016.

In March 2018, Partridge revealed that he had testicular cancer back in 2004. He had kept the diagnosis secret due to fears of losing work, revealing it only to encourage men to screen and test for prostate and testicular cancer.

He enjoys the music of Vera Lynn and 50 Cent.

== Awards and nominations ==
- 2008 – TV Quick and TV Choice Awards – Best Newcomer – nominated
- 2010 – Stonewall Awards – Entertainer of the Year – won
- 2018 – Winner Celebrity Masterchef

== Theatre credits ==
=== Pantomime roles ===
Year	Title	Role	Location
2011/2012	Cinderella	Prince Charming	Marlowe Theatre, Kent
2013/2013	Cinderella	Prince Charming	Theatre Royal, Nottingham
2013/2014	Snow White & the Seven Dwarfs	Prince John	Birmingham Hippodrome, Birmingham
2014/2015	Snow White & the Seven Dwarfs	Prince John	Swansea Grand Theatre, Swansea
2015/2016	Cinderella	Prince Charming	Royal & Derngate, Northampton
2017/2018	Sleeping Beauty	Prince Michael of Maravia	Grove Theatre, Dunstable
2018/2019	Dick Whittington	King Rat	Theatre Royal, Plymouth
2023	Beauty And The Beast	Captain Gastoff Partridge	The Capitol, Horsham
2024/2025	Jack And The Beanstalk	Flesh Creep	The Capitol, Horsham

=== Other credits ===
- The Silence of the Lambs - Hannibal Lecter, Curve Theatre Leicester 2026
- Everybody's Talking About Jamie – Hugo Battersby/Loco Chanelle, UK Tour/West End 2023/24
- The Witches of Eastwick – Darryl Van Horne, UK Concert 2022
- Cabaret – Emcee, UK Tour 2019/20
- The View UpStairs – Buddy, 2019, Soho Theatre, London
- Rough Crossing – Turai, UK tour 2019
- The Case of The Frightened Lady – Tanner, UK Tour 2018
- La Cage aux Folles – Albin, UK tour 2017
- Chicago – Billy Flynn, UK tour 2016
- A Chorus Line – Zach, 2013 The London Palladium
- The Drowsy Chaperone – Novello Theatre, 2007
- Miss Saigon – John, UK tour 2005
- Taboo – Marilyn, The Venue
- Hunting of the Snark – Butcher, Prince Edward Theatre
- The Who's Tommy – Lover/Harmonica Player Shaftesbury Theatre
- Grease – Roger, Dominion Theatre
- The Fix – Donmar Warehouse
- Rent – Roger Davis, Berlin & Düsseldorf (Germany)
- Notre-Dame de Paris – Gringoire, Dominion Theatre
- Black Goes with Everything – Churchill Theatre, Bromley
- Starlight Express – Electra, Apollo Victoria Theatre
- Cats – Rum Tum Tugger
- Dick Whittington – King Rat, Theatre Royal, Plymouth
- Netflix:Queen Cleopatra – Julius Caesar
- Southwark Playhouse The Code - Billy Haines

== Other ==
- 102 Dalmatians: Puppies to the Rescue – Manny the mole (voice)

== Discography ==
- The New Starlight Express (1992) as Electra the Electric Train (CD)
- Cats (1998) as Rum Tum Tugger (DVD)
- Rent (1999) original German cast recording as Roger Davis (CD)
- The Fix (musical) original London cast recording (CD)
- Taboo (2003) as Marilyn (DVD)
- Cats Germany (2004) as Rum Tum Tugger
- Dames, Dudes + Cowboys Too (2014)
