= Betty Laine =

English dance teacher and former professional dancer

Betty Laine OBE, is an English dance teacher and former professional dancer.

== Biography ==
Born Betty Chamberlain in Cardiff, Wales in the United Kingdom, Betty Laine was educated at the Ursuline Convent School in Brentwood, Essex, and received her vocational training in dance and theatre at the Romford branch of the Bush Davies School of Theatre Arts, receiving tuition from Marjorie Davies, Joyce Percy and Daphne Peterson. She would go on to work extensively as a dancer in the theatre and television industry. After retiring from the professional world, she transitioned into teaching as a director of the Frecker-Laine School of Dancing in Epsom, Surrey. She ultimately developed the school into a full-time dance and musical theatre college, today's Laine Theatre Arts, established in 1974. The college is now recognised amongst the leading performing arts institutions in the UK, with former students working worldwide in dance and theatre, including West End and Broadway musicals, dance companies, television, film and pop music. In recognition of her work, Laine was appointed Officer of the Order of the British Empire (OBE) in the 2002 Birthday Honours, for services to the Performing Arts.

In 2022, she retired as the principal of Laine Theatre Arts. She was awarded the Laurence Olivier Industry Recognition Award at the 2026 Laurence Olivier Awards.

== ISTD ==
Laine is a senior member of the Imperial Society of Teachers of Dancing, a dance teaching and examination board. She received her certification as a dance teacher with the organisation, and would eventually be appointed as an examiner for the Classical Ballet and Modern Theatre faculties. She is now a member of the Grand Council, the main administrative body of the organisation, and also works as a lecturer and adjudicator.
