= Warren Carlyle =

British director and choreographer

Warren Carlyle is a British director and choreographer who was born in Norwich, Norfolk, England. He received Drama Desk Award nominations for Outstanding Choreography and Outstanding Director of a Musical for the 2009 revival of Finian's Rainbow.

== Life and career ==
Carlyle trained in dance at the Central School of Dancing Norwich, Bush Davies School of Theatre Arts and Doreen Bird College of Performing Arts. He has directed and provided choreography for theatre and musicals on Broadway and around the world as well as for film and television.

He started as a dancer, after taking dance lessons, but then was chosen by Susan Stroman to be associate choreographer for the West End Royal National Theatre production of Oklahoma! (1998), and she later chose him to assist her on the Broadway musical The Producers. Carlyle moved to New York in 2000.

Carlyle was both director and choreographer of the Broadway revival of Finian's Rainbow in 2009, for which he received Drama Desk Award nominations for Outstanding Choreography and Outstanding Director of a Musical. He was the choreographer and co-director of the new musical Limelight: The Story of Charlie Chaplin, which premiered at the La Jolla Playhouse, San Diego, California, in 2010, and which ran on Broadway in 2012 as Chaplin.

He was the choreographer for the Kennedy Center production of Follies (2011), with Eric D. Schaeffer as director. The two worked together on the Kennedy Center production of Mame in 2006. This production transferred to Broadway and then to Los Angeles, both in limited engagements. Carlyle received a nomination for the 2012 Drama Desk Award for Outstanding Choreography.

Carlyle was the choreographer for the Broadway productions of The Mystery of Edwin Drood in 2012, A Christmas Story: The Musical in 2012 and After Midnight in 2013 (which he also directed). In early 2022, Carlyle will direct Harmony: A New Musical at the National Yiddish Theatre Folksbiene.

== Theatre credits ==
Sources: BroadwayWorld and abouttheartists.com

- The Music Man (Broadway) (2022 Tony Award, Best Choreography nominee)
- Harmony: A New Musical (Off-Broadway) (National Yiddish Theatre Folksbiene)
- Kiss Me, Kate (2019) (Broadway) (2019 Tony Award, Best Choreography nominee)
- Me and My Girl (2018) (Encores! staged concert) (director and choreographer)
- Hello, Dolly! (2017) (Broadway) (2017 Drama Desk Award Outstanding Choreography nominee)
- She Loves Me (2016) (Broadway)
- After Midnight (2013) (Broadway) (2014 Tony Award, Best Choreography winner)
- Follies (2011) (Kennedy Center)
- Finian's Rainbow (2009 revival, Broadway)
- Finians Rainbow (2009) (Encores! at City Center)
- Girl Crazy (2009) (Encores! at City Center)
- Lucky Guy (2009) (Goodspeed Opera House)
- A Tale of Two Cities (2008) (Broadway and Asolo Repertory Theatre)
- On the Town (2008) (Encores! at City Center))
- Juno (2008) (Encores! at City Center)
- The 24 Hour Musicals (2008) (The Public Theater)
- Stairway to Paradise (2007) (Encores! at City Center)
- You Again (NY Fringe)
- Working (Zipper)
- 101 Dalmatians Musical US tour, 2009
- Dancing in the Dark (2008) (Old Globe Theatre, San Diego)
- Roundabout Theatre Gala 2006
- Mame (2006) (Kennedy Center)
- The Pirates of Penzance (2006) (Goodspeed Opera House and Paper Mill Playhouse) Connecticut Critics Award for Best Choreography
- Me and My Girl (2006) (UK tour, director as well) Best Production 2007 Theater Goers Choice Award
- Slut! (2005, Off-Broadway at America Theatre of Actors)
- The Baker's Wife (2002) (Goodspeed Opera House)
- Pageant (2001) (Second City, Chicago)
- The Goodbye Girl (1st UK national tour)
- Pageant (The Vaudeville Theater, London)
- Moving On, Stephen Sondheim revue (2000) The Bridewell Theatre, London
- Scrooge (European tour)

== Film and television ==
- So You Think You Can Dance (2015–)
- Deception (2008), starring Hugh Jackman and Ewan McGregor (20th Century Fox)
- Hope and Faith (2005), Episode "Charley's Shirt" (ABC)
- An Evening at the Boston Pops (PBS)
- Elton John's "Made in England" video
