= Sophie Lloyd =

British guitarist and YouTube personality

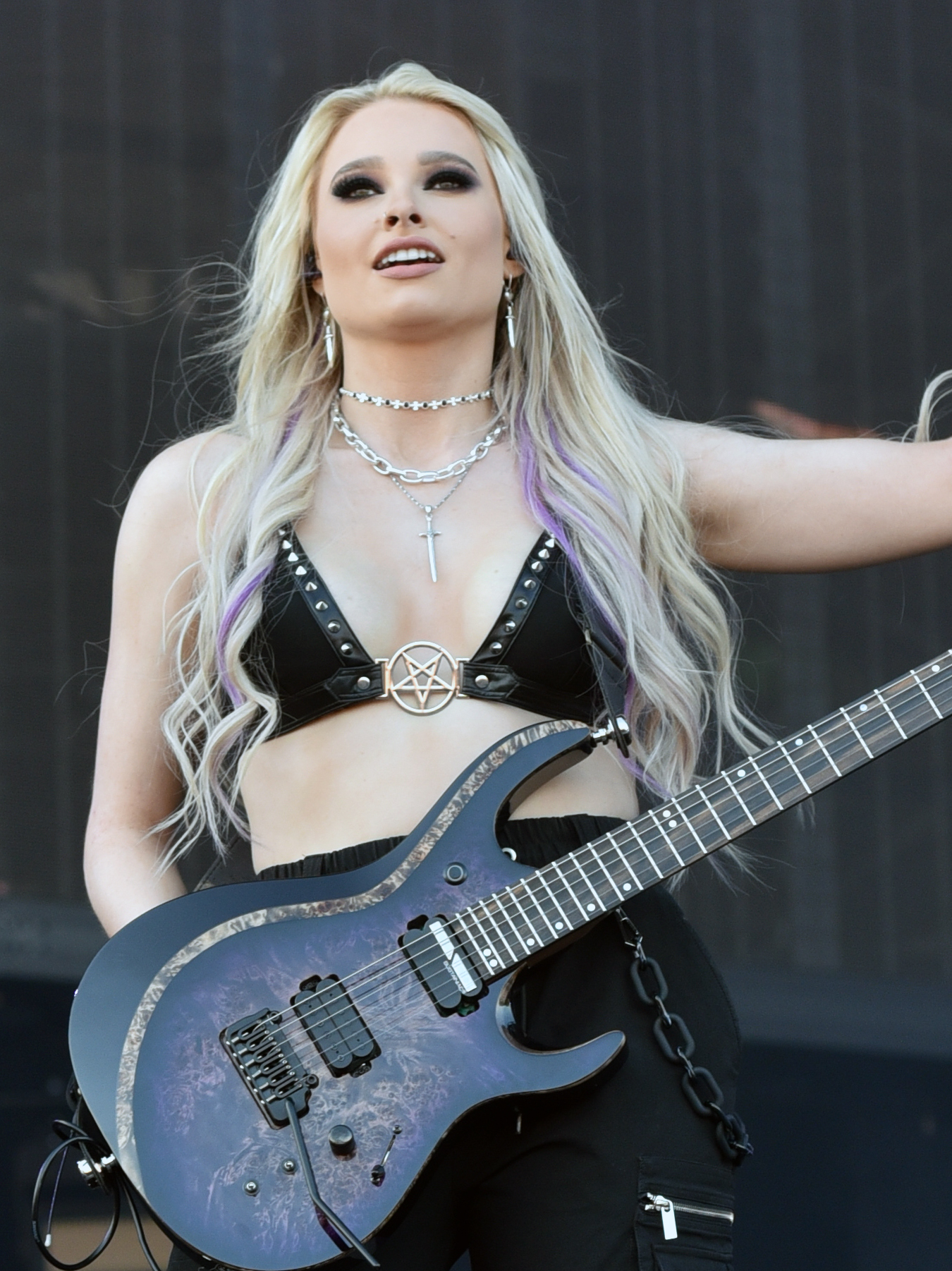
- Lloyd performing with MGK in 2023

Background information
- Born: 22 October 1995 (age 30); Oxford, England
- Genres: Alternative rock; heavy metal; hard rock; pop-punk
- Occupation: Guitarist
- Member of: MGK

YouTube information
- Channel: Sophie Lloyd
- Years active: 2011–present
- Genres: Music; vlogs
- Subscribers: 1.25 million
- Views: 203 million
- Last updated: 21 October 2025
- Website: sophieguitar.com

Sophie Lloyd (born 22 October 1995) is a British guitarist. Since 2011, she has gained international recognition on YouTube as a rock music guitarist. She has been a guitarist in MGK's touring band, which she joined in 2022. Her debut EP "Delusions" was released in 2018. Her debut solo album, Imposter Syndrome, was released in 2023.

== Early life ==
Sophie Lloyd was born in Oxford on 22 October 1995. She grew up in Henley-on-Thames. She first picked up guitar at the age of nine, after watching "Goofy Goober Rock", a modified cover version of Twisted Sister's "I Wanna Rock", in the 2004 film The SpongeBob SquarePants Movie. Her early influences included metal bands Iron Maiden, Black Label Society and Pantera, as well as Joe Bonamassa and Halestorm. She graduated with first-class honours as a Bachelor of Music in Popular Music Performance from the BIMM Institute London in 2018, and is a professional composer.

== Career ==
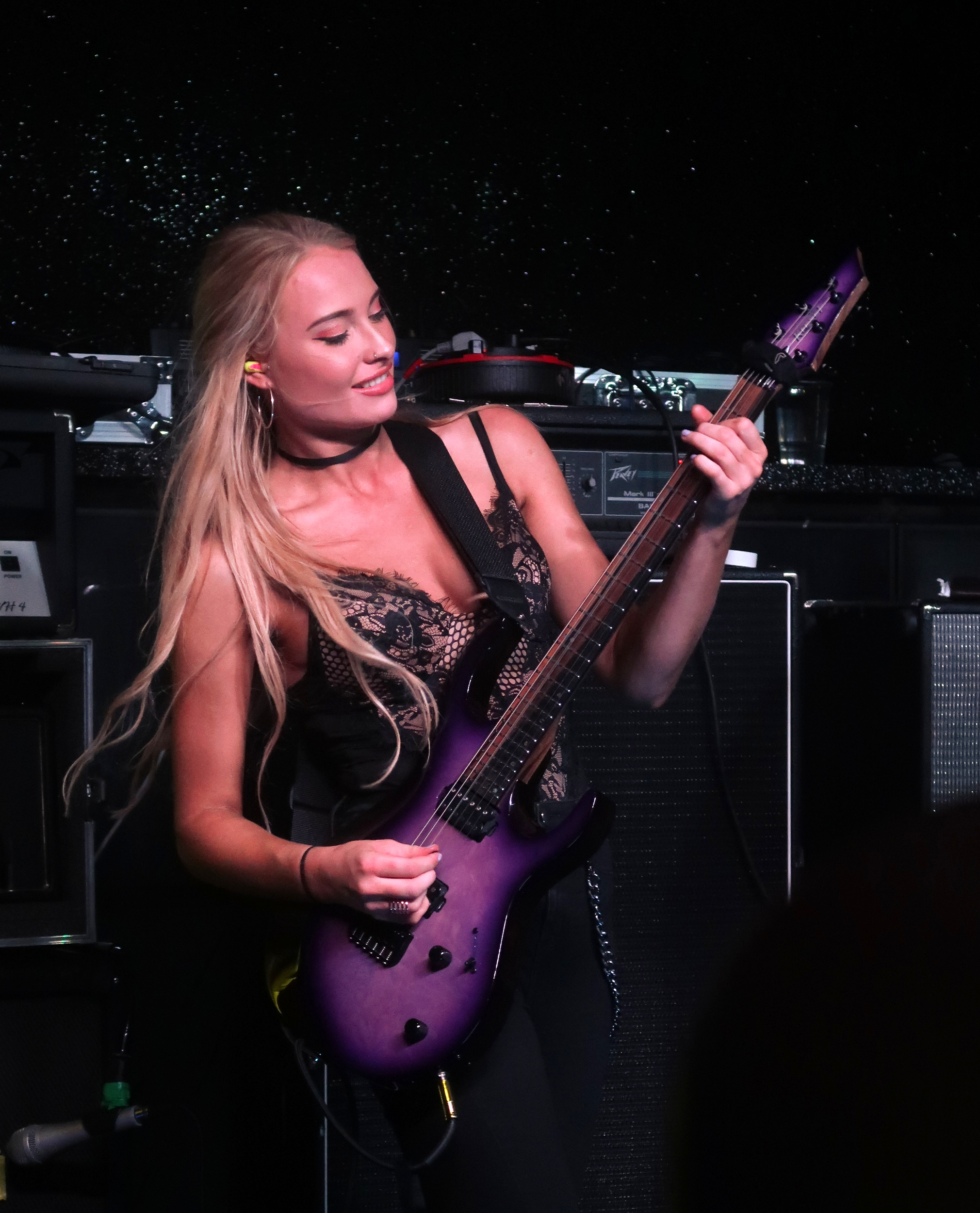
Sophie Lloyd performing in London with Marisa And The Moths in 2019

Sophie Lloyd started her YouTube channel in 2011, highlighting her instrumental cover versions, her own compositions, guitar equipment reviews, and her shredding and soloing techniques. Her YouTube channel gained international recognition, achieving 54 million views by December 2020. She joined MGK's touring band in 2022, for his Mainstream Sellout Tour. She was voted Best Rock Guitarist of 2022 by the readership of MusicRadar. The solo of "Do or Die" was voted by Guitar World readers as the 2nd best guitar solo of 2022. Her debut album, Imposter Syndrome, debuted at #3 on the UK Rock chart and #11 on the Indie chart in 2023. The album gained a nomination for Best Breakthrough Album at the 2024 Heavy Music Awards and was ranked as one of the best debut albums of 2023 by Classic Rock. In June 2024, her debut solo headline show was first announced for Camden Assembly the following October and then upgraded to The Underworld, due to high demand. In September 2024, her US debut headline show was announced for the Whisky a Go Go in January 2025. In 2025 and 2026, she played for MGK's touring band once again on the Lost Americana Tour.

== Equipment ==
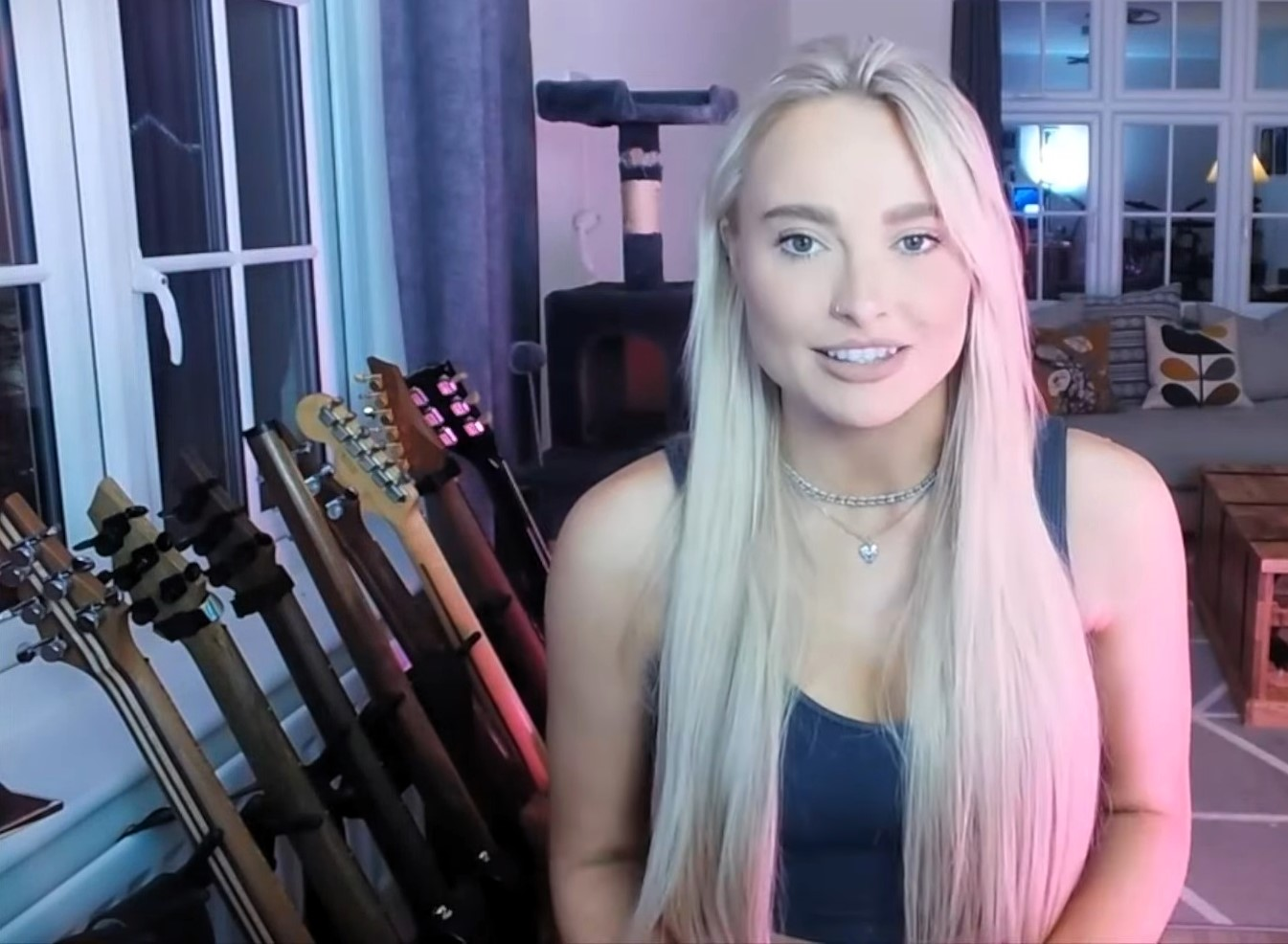
Lloyd with her guitars in 2023

Sophie Lloyd is endorsed by Kiesel Guitars and Ernie Ball strings. She has also used EVH and Diezel guitar amplifiers and Boss effects pedals.

== Discography ==
Albums

- SHRED Vol.1 (2023)
- Imposter Syndrome (2023)

EP

- Delusions (2018)

Singles

- "Bulletproof Revolver" (2019)
- "Do Or Die" (2022)
- "Fall Of Man" (2023)
- "Hanging On" (2023)

As a credited artist

- "JJK" (MGK & Yuki Chiba; 2026)
