= Francesca Jaynes =

English choreographer and movement director

- Born: 12 October 1958 (age 67); Woodford, Essex, United Kingdom
- Occupations: Choreographer; Movement director
- Website: francescajaynes.com

Francesca Jaynes (born 12 October 1958) is an English choreographer and movement director who works in many disciplines within the entertainment industry, including feature films, theatre and commercials.

== Early career ==
Jaynes trained at the Bush Davies School of Theatre Arts, and danced professionally for several years before suffering a serious injury that led to a transition into choreography. Following several years choreographing musical stage acts, she began working in UK television in 1982 and a career in film began in 1999 with Mike Leigh's Topsy-Turvy, earning her a nomination in the American Choreography Awards.

== Film and television ==
Jaynes' work in feature film covers a period of three decades and multiple genres, including costume drama (The Duchess, Great Expectations), family (Dumbo, Muppets Most Wanted, Charlie and the Chocolate Factory), science fiction (Gravity, A.I. Artificial Intelligence), fantasy (Avengers: Age of Ultron, Clash of the Titans), and music-based drama (De-Lovely, Topsy-Turvy).

Her television credits include work with Judi Dench and Dustin Hoffman in Roald Dahl's Esio Trot for the BBC, as well as programmes such as Quiz by James Graham, Foyle's War, Agatha Christie's Marple, The Virgin Queen, and Tipping the Velvet.

=== Film and television credits ===
Year released	Title	Production company	Director
2022	Enola Holmes 2	Legendary Entertainment	Harry Bradbeer
2022	House of the Dragon	HBO	Clare Kilner, Geeta Vasant Patel
2021	Black Widow	Marvel Studios	Cate Shortland
2020	Quiz	Left Bank Pictures	Stephen Frears
2019	Dumbo	Walt Disney Pictures	Tim Burton
2019	The Spanish Princess	STARZ	Birgitte Stærmose
2019	Traitors	Twenty Twenty Television	Dearbhla Walsh
2018	A Very English Scandal	Amazon Studios / BBC	Stephen Frears
2017	Breathe	The Imaginarium Studios	Andy Serkis
2017	Will	TNT Drama	Shekhar Kapur
2016	Allied	Paramount Pictures	Robert Zemeckis
2016	Miss Peregrine's Home for Peculiar Children	Tim Burton Productions/Chernin Entertainment	Tim Burton
2016	Alice Through the Looking Glass	Walt Disney Pictures	James Bobin
2015	Pinewood: 80 Years of Movie Magic	BBC	John Hodgson
2015	Avengers: Age of Ultron	Marvel Studios	Joss Whedon
2015	Roald Dahl's Esio Trot – TV	BBC/Endor Productions	Dearbhla Walsh
2014	Muppets Most Wanted	Walt Disney Pictures	James Bobin
2013	Gravity	Warner Brothers Pictures	Alfonso Cuaron
2013	The Invisible Woman	Magnolia Mae Films	Ralph Fiennes
2012	Great Expectations	Number 9 Films Ltd	Mike Newell
2010	Foyle's War – TV	ITV	David Richards
2010	Alice in Wonderland	Walt Disney Pictures	Tim Burton
2008	The Duchess	BBC Films/Pathe	Saul Dibb
2007	Sweeney Todd: The Demon Barber of Fleet Street	DreamWorks	Tim Burton
2006	The Da Vinci Code	Columbia Pictures	Ron Howard
2005	Charlie and the Chocolate Factory	Warner Brothers Pictures	Tim Burton
2004	Vera Drake	Thin Man Films	Mike Leigh
2004	De-Lovely	MGM	Irwin Winkler
2002	Tipping the Velvet – TV	BBC	Geoffrey Sax
2001	A.I. Artificial Intelligence	Warner Brothers Pictures	Steven Spielberg
1999	Topsy-Turvy	Thin Man Films	Mike Leigh
1991	Sherlock Holmes The Master Blackmailer	ITV	Sally Head

== Theatre ==
Jaynes began choreographing for theatre in the late 1980s, and continues to work regularly in this discipline. In 2015 it was announced that she would be working with Mike Leigh on The Pirates of Penzance for the English National Opera.

Her work has been created for a wide range of theatres including the New Wolsey Theatre (Ipswich), Salisbury Playhouse, Birmingham Rep, Holland Park Opera, Stafford Festival Shakespeare, The Old Vic (London) and The National Theatre (London).

Jaynes has collaborated for more than 20 years with Director Peter Rowe on shows including Blues in the Night, Little Shop of Horrors, Guys and Dolls, and It's a Wonderful Life.

=== Theatre credits ===
Year	Production	Theatre	Director
2023	TONY! The Tony Blair Rock Opera	Leicester Square Theatre	Peter Rowe
2019/20	ONCE	No. 1 UK National Tour	Peter Rowe
2018	Still Alice	West Yorkshire Playhouse	Peter Rowe
2015	Sweet Charity	New Wolsey Theatre	Peter Rowe
2015	The Pirates of Penzance	English National Opera / London Coliseum	Mike Leigh
2014	Midsummer Songs	New Wolsey Theatre	Peter Rowe
2014	Kafka's Dick	Bath Theatre Royal	David Grindley
2013	Our House	New Wolsey Theatre/UK National Tour	Peter Rowe
2013	Daytona	Park Theatre London	David Grindley
2011	Guys and Dolls	Clwyd Theatr Cymru/Salisbury Playhouse/UK National Tour	Peter Rowe
2010	Little Shop of Horrors	Birmingham Rep	Peter Rowe
2009	It's a Wonderful Life	New Wolsey Theatre	Peter Rowe
2009	Orpheus in the Underworld	Holland Park Opera	John Abulafia
2008	Afterlife	The National Theatre	Michael Blakemore
2007	Stephen Fry's Cinderella	The Old Vic	Fiona Laird
2007	Blues in the Night	New Wolsey Theatre	Peter Rowe
2006	Promises and Lies	Birmingham Rep	Jonathan Church
2005	Sugar	New Wolsey Theatre	Peter Rowe
2003	The Threepenny Opera	The National Theatre	Tim Baker
2000	Equus	Salisbury Playhouse	Joanna Read
2000	My Best Friend	Hampstead Theatre	Anthony Clark
2000	Leader of the Pack	Belgrade Theatre, Coventry	Peter Rowe

== Commercials ==
Jaynes' choreographic and movement work has been seen in commercials for numerous major brands, both national and international. The 2018 "Back to the Fuchsia" campaign for Ted Baker was choreographed by Jaynes, inspired by the song Think Pink from the musical Funny Face. In 2014, she choreographed a sequence in "The Gentleman's Wager", a six-minute ad for Johnnie Walker Blue Label starring Jude Law and Giancarlo Giannini which premiered at the Venice Film Festival. SmartWater, Lynx, Sainsbury's, and Scottish Widows are amongst the other brands whose commercials have featured her work.

== Short films ==
In addition to her work as a choreographer and movement director, Jaynes has also created work as a writer/director of short films. Her first film, For George, was completed in 2012, and was an Official Selection at the United Film Festival (London, UK), Festival Filmets (Badalona, Spain), and Best Actors Film Festival (San Francisco, USA), where it won the award for "Best Ensemble Cast in a Short Drama".

Her second short film, Gnomeland, was completed in 2013, and was chosen as an Official Selection at the Two Short Nights Film Festival (Exeter, UK) and the Deep Fried Film Festival (Lanarkshire, UK).
