= Damian Keyes =

British musician (born 1976)

- Born: 5 August 1976 (age 49); Swansea
- Occupations: Musician and music educator
- Years active: 1997 – present
- Known for: founding director of The Brighton Institute of Modern Music
- Title: Director at DK Music Management Ltd.
- Website: damiankeyes.com

Damian Keyes (born 5 August 1976) is a Welsh musician, teacher and founding director of The Brighton Institute of Modern Music.

== Biography ==
Damian Keyes was born in Swansea, Wales. He studied at Emanuel School.

Keyes was hired as a bass guitar teacher at The Academy of Contemporary Music (Guildford) in 1997 when he was 19 years old.

In 2001, Keyes joined with record producer Kevin Nixon, former Little Angels guitarist Bruce Dickinson and promotions manager Sarah Clayman to open The Brighton Institute of Modern Music, an independent music school. BIMM and Keyes have been awarded several business awards and are in the Guinness Book of World Records for "The Loudest Band in the World" (2007) record which they hold in association with Punk band Gallows.

In 2006, Keyes teamed up with former Skunk Anansie Ace on the radio show "The Damo and Ace Show" on Juice 107.2 in Brighton.

Keyes left BIMM in 2008 to start "Vocademy", a singing school for children.

In 2010, Keyes sold his shares of BIMM in 2010 and started DK Music Management company. and DK Music Academy (a music school in Surrey).
