= Linn Bjørnland =

Norwegian actor

Linn Bjørnland, born in Scotland and raised in Norway, is a former actress. She trained as a ballet dancer with the Norwegian National Ballet and graduated from Bird college in London. She has appeared on HBO's True Blood, the NBC production Grimm, TNT's Leverage, CW's Hart of Dixie, Code Black and the Lifetime's TV movie Secrets in Suburbia.

After Bjørnland got married and gave birth to three children, she gave up her acting career and settled in Ojai where she opened a bakery.

== Filmography ==
=== Film ===
Year	Title	Role	Notes
2008	Pepperoni	Lucy	Short
2008	Traveling in Circles	Embla	Short
2009	Christmas Eve	Evie	Video
2012	The Case of the Missing Garden Gnome	Marilu	Short
2013	Channeling	Mandy	
2013	It's Not Porn...	Hot Vampire	Short
2013	Echoes	Jonie Graves	Short
2014	Persephone	Lady Vesta	Short
2017	Willie and Me	Heike	
2022	Escape Through Africa a.k.a. The Unbreakable Sword	Anne Corringfield	

=== Television ===
Year	Title	Role	Notes
2011	Grimm	Camilla Gotlieb	Episode: "BeeWare"
2012	Leverage	Laurie Miller	Episode: "The D.B. Cooper Job"
2013	True Blood	Niall's Mother	Episode: "Fuck the Pain Away"
2014	Fairy Tales	Queen Luna	Episodes: "1.1", "1.2", "1.3"
2014	Hart of Dixie	Eloise	Episode: "Carrying Your Love with Me"
2015	Code Black	Basti's Mother	Episode: "Pilot"
2015	Jane the Virgin	Heidi Von Ocher	Episode: "Chapter 26"
2016	Ray Donovan	Diane Desmond	Episode: "Lake Hollywood"
2017	Secrets in Suburbia	Kim	TV film
2018	Counterpart	Delivery Room Nurse	Episode: "The Sincerest Form of Flattery"
2018	Criminal Minds	Cheryl Kaline	Episode: "The Dance of Love"
