= The Imitation Game (Play for Today) =

1980 British television play based loosely on Alan Turing

- Play for Today episode
- First edition (containing the title play) (publ. 1981 by Jonathan Cape)
- Episode no.: Series 10; Episode 27
- Directed by: Richard Eyre
- Written by: Ian McEwan
- Original air date: April 26, 1980

"The Imitation Game" is a television play written by Ian McEwan and directed by Richard Eyre, a BBC Play for Today, first broadcast on 26 April 1980.

== Plot ==
It is 1940 in Frinton and 19-year-old Cathy Raine turns down a job at the local munitions factory and, much to the consternation of her parents and boyfriend Tony, joins the ATS. She is assigned to a wireless listening station, transcribing Enigma coded Morse transmissions from Nazi Germany and makes friends with Mary. After an altercation in a pub she is moved to Bletchley Park, the centre of the code-breaking operation, only to find herself cleaning and making tea. She overhears the male staff discussing the eponymous imitation game (as devised by Bletchley Park's Alan Turing). Cathy is befriended by Cambridge mathematics don Turner (based loosely on Turing) and they end up in bed together but for Turner it is a failure and he accuses her of planning it all to humiliate him. Later Cathy is caught in Turner's room reading documents relating to the Ultra programme, and she is incarcerated in military prison for the remainder of the war.

== Cast ==
- Harriet Walter as Cathy Raine
- Lorna Yabsley as Anna Raine
- Bernard Gallagher as Mr. Raine
- Gillian Martell as Mrs. Raine
- Simon Chandler as Tony
- Brenda Blethyn as Mary
- Nicholas Le Prevost as Turner
- Patricia Routledge as ATS Officer
- Geoffrey Chater as Colonel in cell
- Keith Marsh as Factory Clerk
- Danny Webb as Dispatch Rider
- Rhys McConnochie as Technical Officer

== Inspiration ==
Writing in 1980, Ian McEwan said "initially I wanted to write a play about Alan Turing, one of the founding fathers of modern computers", but that his research provided very little material. He continued:

by this time other facts about Bletchley Park interested me more. By the end of the war ten thousand people were working in and around Bletchley. The great majority of them were women doing vital but repetitive jobs ... The ‘need to know’ rule meant that the women knew as much as was necessary to do their jobs, which was very little. As far as I could discover, there were virtually no women in at the centre of the Ultra secret. There was a widely held view at the beginning of the war that women could not keep secrets. I had come to think of Ultra as a microcosm, not only of the war but of a whole society ... By having a woman at the centre of the film (I no longer thought of it as a play), I could disguise my own ignorance about Ultra as hers. The idea was to have her move from the outermost ring to the very centre, where she would be destroyed.
