= Doreen Bird =

Doreen Bird Hon MA, FISTD, ARAD, founder of Bird College

Doreen Bird MA FISTD ARAD (27 January 1928 – 4 February 2004) was a British dance teacher and founder of the Doreen Bird College of Performing Arts in Sidcup, Kent (now Southeast London). She was a fellow, examiner, lecturer, committee and council member of the ISTD, life member of the RAD, and Honorary MA. Prior to her death from leukaemia in 2004, she had been studying towards a Ph.D. As well as being a respected dance figure in the United Kingdom, Bird also travelled the World as a lecturer and adjudicator specialising in dance and musical theatre. The college which Bird founded is now recognised Internationally as a centre of excellence for dance and performing arts, with its students working worldwide in high-profile areas of the performing industry including West End and Broadway theatre.

== Professional accomplishments ==
=== Dance College ===
In 1945, Bird founded the Doreen Bird School of Dance, the predecessor of today's Bird College of Dance, Music & Theatre Performance. Bird initially taught her students in her parents' living room then a local church hall, before opening a full-time performing arts course at permanent premises in Sidcup. This became the Doreen Bird College of Performing Arts and Bird remained principal of the college until her retirement in 1998, when the name Bird College was adopted under its new principal. The college is one of the United Kingdom's leading institutions for specialist dance and musical theatre training, with many ex-students of the college appearing in dance and theatre Worldwide including West End and Broadway theatre. The college now operates a range of courses including the National Diploma in Musical Theatre and the BA (Hons) Degree in Dance & Theatre Performances, both courses being established during Bird's tenure as principal. The college has continued to expand since Bird died, becoming the first college of its kind in the UK to offer an MA Degree (by research), as subject specialist provider for the University of Greenwich. Since October 2007, the college has also been the official provider of music and dance services for the London Borough of Bexley.

=== Imperial Society of Teachers of Dancing ===
Doreen Bird pictured presenting awards at the 2002 Janet Cram Awards of the Imperial Society of Teachers of Dancing.

Doreen Bird was a member of the ISTD, an international dance examination board based in London, England. As a life member of the organisation, she served as a teacher, examiner, lecturer, committee and council member. She was appointed an examiner of the Modern Theatre Branch in 1957, National Dance Branch in 1958 and Imperial Ballet Branch in 1964, travelling the world as a representative of the society. Bird served as a member of the ISTD Grand Council from 1970 to 1975, and became a committee member of the Modern Theatre Branch in 1970, a post which she held for sixteen years until 1986. During her time as a committee member of the ISTD, Bird was influential in the examination of dance and the modernisation of the organisations syllabus and approach to teaching young dancers. As a member of the Modern Theatre Branch, Bird helped to compile all the society's new Major examination syllabi for Modern Dance and Tap Dance. Much of this work is still used today, although the syllabi are often revised to keep up to date with current trends in dance.

== Awards and honours ==
- In recognition of her work in the field of dance, Bird was awarded an Honorary Master of Arts from the University of Greenwich in 1999
- Bird received the Imperial Faculty Award in 1996, in recognition of her long service as a member of the ISTD
- In 2007 the ISTD launched the "Creation" choreographic competition as a memorial to Bird. The first competition was held at the Harlequin Theatre in Redhill, Surrey

== Sources ==
- Doreen Bird Obituary - Page 4
- University of Greenwich Press Release
- ISTD faculty Autobiography for Doreen Bird
