= Medal examinations (dance) =

In many forms of dance (ballet, ballroom dance, concert dance) medal examinations are held. They are organised by leading dance teaching organisations, such as the Imperial Society of Teachers of Dancing (ISTD), the International Dance Teachers Association (IDTA), and other organisations.

The examinations are a way for a young dancer to mark their progress in the art of dance. They have been extremely popular since their introduction in the early 1930s. They are not a form of professional qualification. Professional qualifications are also offered by the same organisations, and they are much more extensive and demanding.

During a medal test, a dancer will either dance alone (ballet) or be partnered by their teacher (ballroom). An examiner, appointed by the examining body, will observe the performance, and mark it.

It is usual for dance teacher organisations to print guidelines for the figures or routines to be tested. Figures, given a name, such as 'whisk' or 'spin turn', are amalgamated into a routine.

The examining body prescribes a syllabus of figures from which the routines are formed. The syllabus and detailed instructions for performing the dances are published or specified by the examining body, and available for purchase as books or pamphlets. The instructor will have prepared an amalgamation of figures suitable for each level of medal.

The lower levels of examination generally consist mainly of basic figures, such as the natural turn in the Waltz, which demonstrate clear understanding of the technique of the dance in question. Higher levels will include more complex figures, but will usually also require at least some fundamentals, to demonstrate that the lower levels have been built upon. The standard of dance expected at tests goes up at each level.

Depending upon the level and style of the examination, a student might be asked to demonstrate anywhere from one to five different dances, all within one discipline, such as 'Standard', or 'Latin American'. That is because medals are awarded within disciplines. For example, at Bronze level, a Latin American dance student might be asked to dance Cha-cha-cha, Samba and Rumba, whilst the same student would definitely be asked to dance all five International Latin dances at Gold level. A single dance will take up around 60 to 90 seconds; the entire exam, allowing for short breaks between routines, will be between five and ten minutes, depending on the number of dances. Typically, a studio will have a large number of candidates, all examined on the same day.

There is a separate set of tests for student dance teachers, which involves a) dancing b) explaining theory c) demonstrating the ability to teach, including the ability to demonstrate steps of both male and female partners. These are not medal tests, but are often adjudicated in a similar setting by the same examiners on the same day.
