= Laine Theatre Arts =

Independent college in Epsom, Surrey

Location
- East Street; Epsom, Surrey, KT17 1HH; United Kingdom; 51.3348°N 0.2633°W

Information
- Type: Independent FE and HE College
- Motto: Empowering the next generation of exceptional performing artists
- Established: 1974
- Founder: Betty Laine
- Specialist: Performing Arts
- Department for Education URN: 50012 Tables
- Ofsted: Reports
- Principal: Matt Cole
- Gender: Co-educational
- Age: 16+
- Website: http://www.laine-theatre-arts.co.uk

Laine Theatre Arts, sometimes referred to as Laines, is an independent performing arts college, based in the town of Epsom in Surrey, England. The college was founded in 1974 by former professional dancer and dance teacher Betty Laine, and developed from an earlier school, the Frecker-Laine School of Dancing. It provides specialist vocational training in dance and musical theatre.

The College prepares students for a professional career in the performing arts. The college is accredited by the Council for Dance Education and Training and as of 2025 the College is registered by The Office for Students for its HE provision. It offers Qualifications and Curriculum Authority recognised qualifications validated by the Trinity College London and the Ba (Hons) courses are validated by the University of Portsmouth. Key areas of study include singing, acting and dancing ( Musical Theatre). It was rated "Good" by Ofsted in 2023. As of 2023 Olivier award winning Choreographer Matt Cole joined the College as the Principal and Artistic Director. The College is governed by a board of Directors which is chaired by Professor Mark Hunt.

== Overview ==
Laine Theatre Arts provides specialist vocational training at further and higher education level in musical theatre. The college prepares students for a professional career in the performing arts and has a history of feeding artists into West End theatre, dance companies, television, film, pop music and other high-profile areas of the entertainments industry all over the world.

== Training ==
The College offers four tracks of study, covering vocational, professional training in the performing arts

- Laine Theatre Arts Foundation Diploma (1 Year) in Dance and Musical Theatre
- Level 6 Diploma in Professional Musical Theatre validated by Trinity College London
- BA (Hons) Musical Theatre (Unique one year post level 5 Diploma, Top Up Honours Degree. Validated by the University of Portsmouth.
- Ba (Hons) in Professional Musical Theatre validated by the University of Portsmouth.

The Diploma course is accredited by Trinity College London and is recognised by the Qualifications and Curriculum Authority. The college is also accredited to the Council for Dance Education and Training. The BA (Hons) courses are validated by the University of Portsmouth. Many student places at the college are funded by the British Government through the Dance and Drama Awards (DaDA) scheme and students studying for the Ba (Hons) are supported by student Loans company which offers up to £6,250 towards tuition fees per year plus access to maintenance loans on a means tested basis.

The college is also an approved centre of the Imperial Society of Teachers of Dancing. Students have the opportunity to gain nationally recognised dance teaching qualifications with the organisation, in tap and modern theatre dance.

The college stages an annual production "The Laine Show" at the local 'Epsom Playhouse' theatre in June.

== Patrons ==
- Sir Matthew Bourne
- Derek Deane
- David Grindrod
- Stephen Mear
- Dame Arlene Phillips
- Stephen Brooker

== Notable alumni ==
- Victoria Beckham, Fashion Designer and Spice Girl.
- Jamie Benson, later of 90s all-female band Hepburn. Now a trainer at the school.
- Charlie Stemp West End leading man
- Scarlette Douglas
- Dan Burton
- Charlie Bruce, Dancer
- Karen Bruce, Choreographer and Director
- Warwick Davis
- Louise Dearman, West End Star.
- Louise Ekland, French TV Star.
- Kerry Ellis, West End and Broadway Star.
- Jo Gibb, West End star.
- Sean Ghazi, Singer and Actor
- Sarah Hadland, Actress
- Ruthie Henshall, West End & Broadway Star
- Lee Latchford-Evans, from Steps
- Enda Markey, Theatre Producer
- Gerard McCarthy, Actor
- Anu Palevaara
- Dominique Provost-Chalkley
- Aaron Renfree, S Club 8 member, dancer and choreographer.
- Ben Richards, Actor
- Leanne Rowe
- Alex Sawyer
- Charlie Stemp, West End and Broadway Star.
- Summer Strallen, Actor.
- Hayley Tamaddon, Stage and TV Star.
- Nick Winston, Director and Choreographer
- Emrhys Cooper, Actor.
- TonyPitony, Singer.
