= BIMM University =

Music institute of nine colleges in the UK, Ireland and Germany

Coordinates: 50.820°N 0.131°W

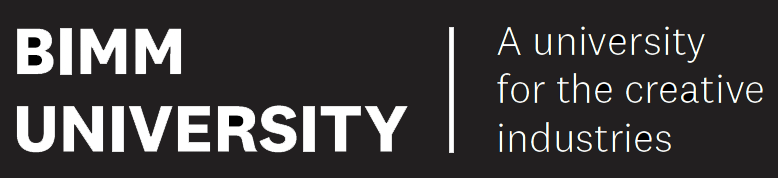
- Former names: Brighton Institute of Modern Music (2001–2010); British and Irish Modern Music Institute (2011–2017); BIMM Institute (2018–2022)
- Type: Creative industries university
- Established: 2001
- Vice-Chancellor: Olivier Robert-Murphy
- Students: 8,300
- Location: Berlin, Birmingham, Brighton, Bristol, Dublin, Essex, Leeds, London, Manchester
- Campus: Multiple sites
- Language: English
- Website: bimm.university

BIMM University (BIMM) is a private university specialising in music, film, performing arts and creative technology. The university is principally based in the United Kingdom with other centres in Ireland and Germany.

It is organised into four academic schools: BIMM Music Institute, Performers College, MetFilm School, and MetStudios. Courses are delivered at nine city-based campuses located across the UK, Ireland and Germany.

It was founded in 2001 as the Brighton Institute of Modern Music, changing its name to the British and Irish Modern Music Institute in 2011 upon the opening of its Dublin campus, before shortening to BIMM Institute in 2018.

It was granted university status in 2022, and the name changed to the present one.

== History ==
BIMM was founded in 2001 by Damian Keyes, Kevin Nixon, Bruce Dickinson and Sarah Clayman who subsequently sold the institute to Sovereign Capital in March 2010.

In 1983, Drumtech was founded by Francis Seriau, later becoming Tech Music School. In 2010, BIMM acquired Tech Music School London and in 2014 Tech Music School changed its name to BIMM London.

BIMM was purchased by Intermediate Capital Group in 2020.

Due to changes in student demand, BIMM Hamburg closed at the end of the 2023 academic year.

In 2026, the University Campus of Football Business announced it was to become a college of BIMM University under a validation agreement, while remaining an independent institution.

=== Timeline ===
- 1983 – Drumtech is founded (now BIMM London)
- 2001 – Brighton Institute of Modern Music is founded
- 2008 – BIMM Bristol opens
- 2010 – BIMM acquires Tech Music School (formally Drumtech)
- 2011 – BIMM Dublin opens (name is also changed to the British and Irish Modern Music Institute)
- 2013 – BIMM Institute Manchester opens
- 2016 – BIMM Institute Berlin opens
- 2017 – BIMM Institute Birmingham opens and the Brighton Institute for Contemporary Theatre Training (BRICTT) is founded
- 2018 – BIMM Institute acquires Brighton Film School
- 2019 – BIMM is granted Taught Degree Awarding Powers in the UK by an Order from the Privy Council. BIMM Institute Hamburg opens, BRICTT becomes the Institute for Contemporary Theatre (ICTheatre) and Brighton Film School is renamed Screen and Film School. BIMM also acquires Performers College
- 2020 – BIMM acquires Northern Ballet School and opens ICTheatre Manchester at The Dancehouse
- 2021 – Screen and Film School Manchester, Screen and Film School Birmingham, and Performers College Birmingham open
- 2022 – BIMM is awarded university title and changes its name to BIMM University
- 2024 - ICTheatre merges with Performers College
- 2024 – BIMM University acquires Met Film School

== Organisation and academic life ==
BIMM University is the second largest provider of creative industries higher education in the UK, with around 8,300 students. It offers courses in a wide range of music, film, performing arts and creative technology subjects.

Courses are offered at undergraduate and postgraduate levels.

The university is organised into five academic schools: BIMM Music Institute, Performers College, MetFilm School, MetStudios and BIMM University Berlin. Courses are delivered at nine city-based campuses located across the UK, Ireland and Germany.

== Course and accreditations ==
BIMM Institute was granted Taught Degree Awarding Powers in the UK by an order from the Privy Council on 14 March 2019, having demonstrated that it met the criteria to become a recognised body for awarding degrees in the UK. As such, BIMM Institute has overall responsibility for the academic standards and the quality of the qualifications they offer, and are able to award their own undergraduate and master's degrees. BIMM degrees were previously accredited by the University of Sussex. BIMM Dublin courses are validated by Technological University Dublin.

BIMM was granted full university status by the Department for Education in 2022.

== Notable teachers ==
Kirk Brandon of punk rock band Theatre of Hate was a tutor at the Brighton Institute of Modern Music in 2012. Robin Guy, drummer for Rachel Stamp and Sham 69, also taught at BIMM. Pat Garvey, drummer for Ozric Tentacles and one of the UK's most prominent player-educators is Head of Drums at BIMM.

== Notable alumni ==
=== Music alumni ===
- George Ezra
- James Bay
- Tom Odell
- Ella Mai
- Fontaines DC
- ADONXS
- Ash Soan
- Black Honey
- Chip
- Dani Wilde
- Ed Drewett
- Fickle Friends
- Iolanda Costa
- Izzy Bizu
- Jason Cooper
- Kate Walsh
- The Kooks
- Lana Lubany
- Luke Black
- Luke Machin
- Luke Sital-Singh
- Marina Diamandis
- Mimi Webb
- Monika Linkytė
- The Murder Capital
- Pale Waves
- Rachael Gunn
- Sophie Lloyd
- Ryan O'Shaughnessy
- Scott Benton
- The Xcerts
- Ollie Wride

=== Film alumni ===
- Rina Yang – Cinematographer; credits include Euphoria, Top Boy, Nanny, and Mother Mary.
- Leopold Hughes – Co-producer of Knives Out and Glass Onion; associate producer on Star Wars: The Last Jedi.
- Adjani Salmon – MA Directing graduate; co-writer, co-producer, and lead actor in the BAFTA-winning series Dreaming Whilst Black.
- Ibrahim Nash'at – Documentary filmmaker; director of Hollywoodgate. (2023)
- Guy Trevellyan – Assistant to Wes Anderson on The French Dispatch, Asteroid City, and The Wonderful Story of Henry Sugar; worked on Barbie and The Witcher.
- Sameer Baria – Indian filmmaker and MetFilm graduate.
- Aarsh Gyani – Indian actor and filmmaker; MetFilm graduate.
- Marta Baidek – Visual effects production manager (virtual production)
- Rachel Goacher – Screenwriter; MA Screenwriting alumna
- Alysha Siddiqi – Director; MA Directing alumna

=== Performing arts alumni ===
- Adrian Gas – Choreographer and movement director; has choreographed for Take That Present: The Circus Live (2009) and its 2026 revival, as well as television shows including The Voice, Dancing on Ice, and Got to Dance.
- Mireia Mambo – Actress, singer, and dancer; played Dance Captain and understudied Jean in the West End revival of Sunset Boulevard at the Savoy Theatre.
- Nikki Bentley – Actress and singer; played Elphaba in Wicked in the West End and currently plays Catherine of Aragon in Six at the Vaudeville Theatre.
- Tommy Wade-Smith – Actor and dancer; appeared in the West End productions of Mean Girls and The Book of Mormon.
