= Trinity College London =

British exam board

- Established: 1872
- Parent institution: Trinity Laban
- President: The Lord Geddes
- Location: 7th Floor, 22 Upper Ground, London, SE1 9PD, London, UK
- Website: trinitycollege.com

Trinity College London (TCL) is an examination board based in London, United Kingdom which offers graded and diploma qualifications across a range of disciplines in the performing arts and English language learning and teaching. Trinity College London has examined over 850,000 candidates in more than 60 countries worldwide. It is a registered charity in England, Wales and Scotland, and its Patron is HRH The Duke of Kent.

== History ==
Trinity College London was founded as the external examinations board of Trinity College of Music (which today is part of the Trinity Laban Conservatoire of Music and Dance) in 1872, and began offering exams in music to external students in 1877. In common with its chief competitor, the ABRSM (est. 1889), Trinity College offers a range of graded examinations in music from grades 1–8, followed by Associate, Licentiate and Fellowship diplomas. Over time, Trinity College has expanded to offer exams in other areas of the performing arts and in English for Speakers of Other Languages (ESOL).

== Performing arts examinations ==
In 2004, Trinity College London's performing arts examinations division merged with the external examinations department of the Guildhall School of Music and Drama to form the Trinity Guildhall examinations board. The name Trinity Guildhall was dropped in 2012, and the board's performing arts examinations are now offered under the Trinity College London brand.

=== Music ===
Trinity College London offers graded musical qualifications for musical theory and for performance in a range of string instruments, singing, piano, electronic keyboards, brass, woodwind instruments and percussions, starting with the Initial Grade, then numbered from Grade 1 to Grade 8 with increasing difficulty. Candidates are rated under three categories – the performance of musical pieces, technical work such as scales, and supporting tests such as sight reading and improvisation. Candidates are graded on a scale from 1 to 100, with 60 being the pass mark. Candidates have flexibility in the choices of pieces and tests prepared for each of these sections.

In addition to graded examinations, TCL offers foundation, intermediate and advanced certificates in music. TCL also offers diplomas in music at three levels:

- Associate: ATCL (Performer and Teacher diplomas) and AMusTCL (Composition and Musicology), which are equivalent to the standard of work required for a UK Certificate of Higher Education
- Licentiate: LTCL (Performer and Teacher diplomas) and LMusTCL (Composition and Musicology), which are equivalent to the standard of work required for a UK Bachelor's degree
- Fellowship: FTCL, which is equivalent to the standard of work required for a UK Master's degree

In 2012, the exam board introduced Rock & Pop graded examinations for bass, drums, guitar, keyboard and vocals.

=== Drama and performance ===
Trinity College London offers qualifications in speech and drama, individual acting skills, group performance, Shakespeare, choral speaking, communication skills, musical theatre, and performance arts.

As is the case with music, diplomas in drama, performance and communication subjects are also offered at three levels, and TCL is the awarding body for the series of professional performing arts courses that are funded in part by the Dance and Drama Awards scheme. In 2020, Trinity College London started offering digital examinations to allow its operations to continue during the COVID-19 pandemic.

=== Arts Award ===
Within the United Kingdom, Trinity College London manages Arts Award in association with Arts Council England.

== English language examinations ==
Trinity offers English language qualifications including English for Speakers of Other Languages (ESOL), Teaching English for Speakers of Other Languages (TESOL) and Secure English Language Tests (SELTs).
