= Philip Turbett =

British musician

Philip Turbett (born 15 June 1961 in Omagh, Northern Ireland) is a British bassoonist and clarinettist and orchestra manager, specialising in historically informed performance.

== Orchestral career ==
Turbett has been a bassoonist with Orchestra of the Age of Enlightenment, the English Baroque Soloists, the Orchestre Révolutionnaire et Romantique, the Academy of Ancient Music and the London Classical Players. He has worked with orchestras including the London Philharmonic Orchestra, the Philharmonia, English National Ballet, the Hanover Band, London Baroque, Collegium Musicum 90 and The English Concert.

He has worked with conductors including Sir Simon Rattle, Sir Charles Mackerras, Sir Roger Norrington, Sir Andrew Davis, Sir John Eliot Gardiner, Sir Neville Marriner, Sir Mark Elder, Frans Brüggen, Vladimir Jurowski, Edward Gardner, Paul Daniel and Daniel Harding.

He has performed at concert halls across the world including the Sydney Opera House, Carnegie Hall (New York), the Lincoln Center for the Performing Arts (New York), Symphony Hall (Boston) and Symphony Center (Chicago), Suntory Hall (Tokyo), and all the major European venues. Turbett has performed at London's Southbank Centre, the Barbican Centre, the Royal Festival Hall, annually at Glyndebourne Opera House, the BBC Proms, the Edinburgh International Festival and other UK festivals.

Turbett has appeared and played on television, such as the BBC's Millennium Concert from Ely Cathedral conducted by Sir Simon Rattle and broadcast live on BBC Television and BBC Radio 3, and in 2009 Mendelssohn's A Midsummer Night's Dream with the Orchestra of the Age of Enlightenment, also broadcast on BBC Television. In the summer of 2000 he appeared at three of the BBC's Proms including the concert to commemorate the anniversary of Bach's death. He performed during 2000 in concerts as part of the Bach Cantata Pilgrimage with Sir John Eliot Gardiner and the English Baroque Soloists. On 6 May 2023 he performed at Westminster Abbey for the Coronation of their Majesties King Charles III and Queen Camilla.

"negotiated the concerto-like demands with graceful ease"

"faultless circumnavigation of the sprightly bassoon part in the aria for alto and tenor"

"accompanied by what seemed to be the quiet chuckling of divine laughter itself, in the ticklish tongueing of the bassoon"

== Musical education ==
In 1979, Turbett came to England to study a preliminary course in music at the Centre for Music and Performing Arts within the Colchester Institute. He went on to study bassoon, under Vernon Elliott, and clarinet at Trinity College of Music from 1981 to 1985 where he won the Dame Ruth Railton Prize for Woodwind, the David Toplis Memorial Prize for Woodwind, the Vernon Elliot Prize for Woodwind and the Grace Wylie Prize for Orchestral Playing. Turbett was awarded a postgraduate by the Worshipful Company of Musicians as a research scholar into the 17th and 18th century bassoon.

== Professorships and teaching ==
Turbett was appointed professor of bassoon (including historical performance) and wind chamber music at the Trinity College of Music in 2001. He has also held professorships at the Guildhall School of Music and Drama in London and at the University of Surrey and gives master classes at the Conservatoire de Paris and the Conservatoire de Lyon. Turbett has also been a guest external examiner at the Royal College of Music.

As a teacher, he has worked at the Dartington International Summer School, as a wind coach for the Hampshire Youth Orchestra, as a clarinet tutor for the Essex Youth Orchestras and as a teacher of bassoon, clarinet and saxophone at the Westminster Abbey Choir School, the Benenden School, the Bexley Music School and for the Inner London Education Authority.

== Chamber music ==
=== The Ebony Quartet ===
Turbett is a member of the Ebony Quartet, formed in 1980 whilst the members were studying in Colchester. The members are:

- Graeme Vinall - Clarinet, E♭ Clarinet and Tenor Saxophone
- Philip Turbett - Clarinet, Alto Saxophone and Bassoon
- Trevor Barlow - Clarinet, Alto and Baritone Saxophone
- Rodney Smith - Clarinet, Bass Clarinet, Soprano, Alto and Tenor Saxophone

=== Orchestra management ===
From 2004 to May 2009, Turbett was the orchestra manager at English National Opera where he was responsible for the day-to-day running of all aspects of the orchestral music. He was orchestra manager and bassoonist for English Touring Opera from 2010 to 2023.
