= CMPA =

CMPA may stand for one of the following:

- Canadian Medical Protective Association
- Centre for Music and Performing Arts
- Center for Media and Public Affairs
- The Christadelphian Magazine & Publishing Association, CMPA.
- Madison Railroad (reporting mark CMPA)
- 4-chloro-2-methylphenoxyacetic acid (CMPA), a herbicide
- Cow's milk protein allergy, an allergic reaction to milk.
