= VYSO =

VYSO may refer to:

- Vancouver Youth Symphony Orchestra, Canada
- Victorian Youth Symphony Orchestra, Australia
