= Meinrad Iten =

Swiss painter (1867–1932)

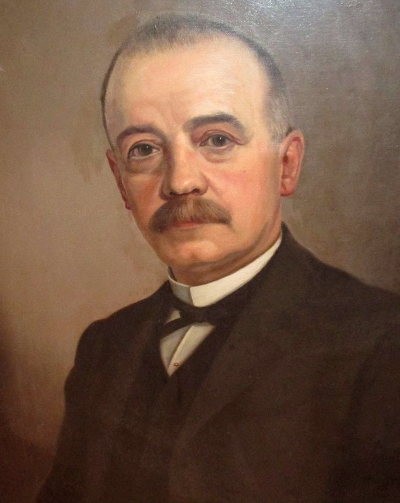
Self-portrait (1914)

Meinrad Iten (30 June 1867, Unterägeri – 28 June 1932, Unterägeri) was a Swiss portrait and landscape painter; associated with the Düsseldorfer Malerschule.

== Biography ==
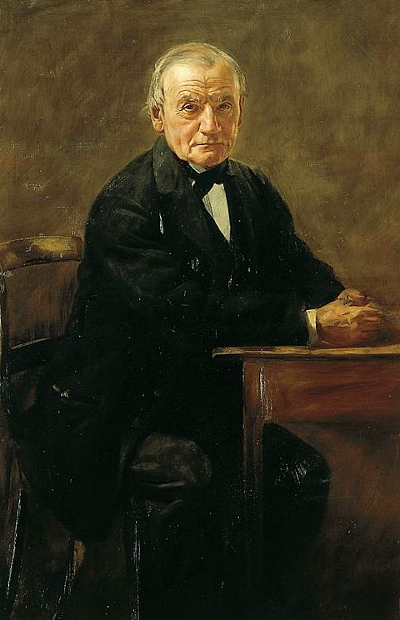
His uncle, Johann

His father, Jakob Josef Iten, a cooper by trade, died when Meinrad was only two years old. His mother, Barbara, took him to live with his uncle, Johann Josef Iten. From 1881 to 1883, he attended a Catholic school in Einsiedeln. There, he received his first drawing lessons, and decided to become a church painter. After completing his secondary education in Stans, he took art lessons from Melchior Paul von Deschwanden, and briefly studied at the Beuron Art School. In 1885, he went to Munich, where he worked in the studios of Joseph Brandenberg (1858–1906), as preparation for applying to the Kunstakademie Düsseldorf.

Later that same year, he was admitted. His principal instructors there included Hugo Crola, Heinrich Lauenstein, and Adolf Schill. On Crola's advice, he abandoned religious art in favor of portraits. His lack of funds often led to gaps in his studies. In 1891 the landscape painter, Johann Peter Theodor Janssen, convinced the Prussian government to award him a scholarship; the first ever given to a foreigner. As a result, he was finally able to graduate in 1893.

From 1888 to 1902, he was a member of the progressive artists' association, Malkasten. This connection enabled him to receive commissions for portraits from notable people. In 1896, he held a joint exhibition with Crola at the Galerie Eduard Schulte and received good reviews. That same year, he participated in the Große Berliner Kunstausstellung. He would remain in Düsseldorf as a free-lance artist until 1899.

In 1899 his former mentor, Janssen, offered him a position at the Akademie, but he declined to accept and returned to his home town in Switzerland. There, he met Wilhelmine Hess, the daughter of a wealthy Hamburg butcher shop owner, who was vacationing in the area. In 1901, they were married, against her father's wishes. They had two daughters and a son. He worked as a portraitist in Zürich and Solothurn; catering to upper-class families.

After World War I, his commissions dwindled, due to his conservative style, so he concentrated on drawings; many of them in red chalk. He drew more than a thousand such portraits of people from throughout the region, as well as numerous landscapes. His most important sponsor in his later years was Philipp Etter, a member of the Canton of Zug council. He lived in Unterägeri from 1907 until his death.

In 1987, the citizen's council of Unterägeri worked to preserve his art with a representative collection of works, and established a fund to promote his art. His great-granddaughter, the British composer Issie Barratt, has created a Meinrad Iten Suite; eleven of his paintings set to music, in a manner reminiscent of Pictures at an Exhibition. It was premiered at the Trinity College of Music in 2010.

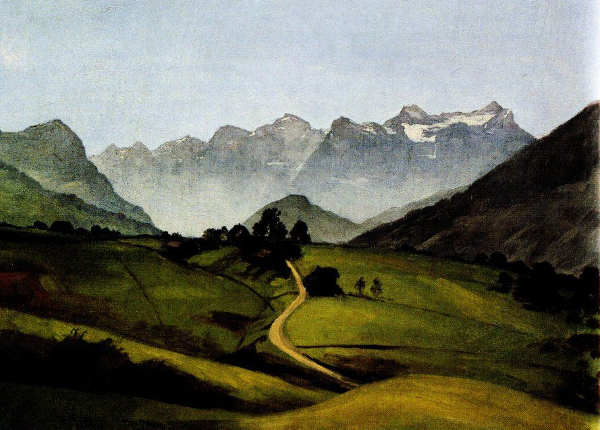
View near Alosen, in Zug
