= Peter Arnold =

Peter Arnold may refer to:

- Peter Arnold (cricketer) (1926–2021), New Zealand cricketer
- Peter Arnold (politician) (1935–2024), Australian politician
- Peter Arnold (musician), British piano professor
