= Anthony Bowne =

English academic and administrator

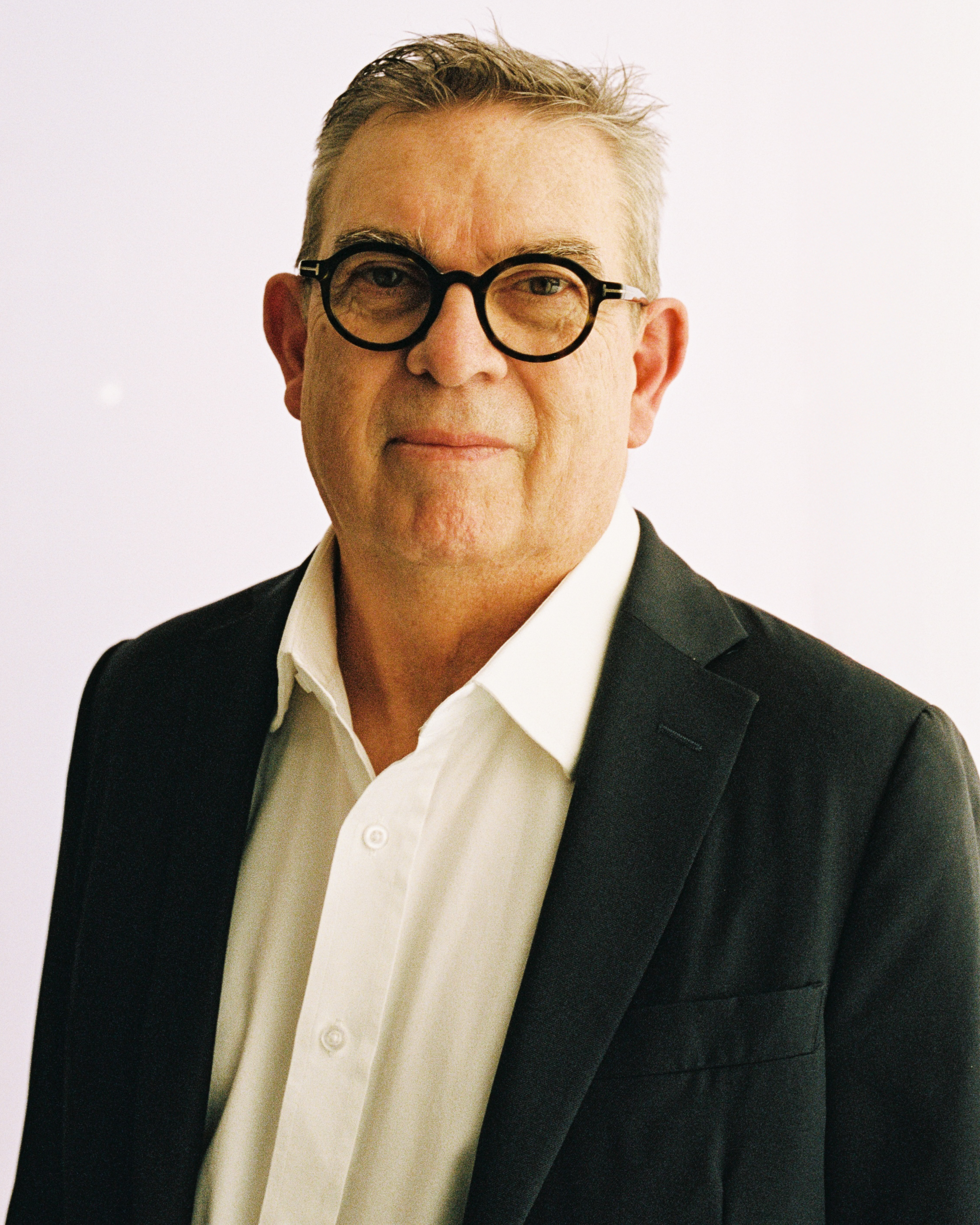
Anthony Bowne in November 2024

Anthony Doran Bowne (born April 1956) is an English academic and administrator. He has been Principal of Trinity Laban Conservatoire of Music and Dance since 2010. Previously, as Director of Laban Dance Centre, Bowne played a key role in the 2005 merger with Trinity College of Music, which formed Trinity Laban, the largest conservatoire in the United Kingdom’s higher education system.

== Education ==
Bowne completed a degree in Economics at the University of Southampton.

Under the mentorship of Bonnie Bird, Bowne realised the idea for the world’s first postgraduate dance company, Transitions, and for the next 15 years managed and toured the company. During that time, he undertook a master's degree in architecture at the Bartlett School of Architecture, University College London aiding his work as a lighting designer in theatre and architecture.

== Career ==
Bowne trained as a theatre and architecture lighting designer.

Bowne taught at the Hong Kong Academy of Performing Arts. In 2003, on the retirement of Marion North, Bowne was appointed Director of Laban. In May 2004, Bowne spoke about the funding and economic impact of Laban to the House of Commons Culture, Media and Sport Committee.

Bowne’s national roles in higher education include current chairmanship of both the Finance and Remunerations Committees of London Higher, the ‘umbrella’ organisation for London's universities, and deputy chair of Conservatoires UK. External appointments in the Arts currently include Chair of Blackheath Halls and board memberships of both the Bonnie Bird Choreography Fund and One Dance UK. Internationally, Bowne was elected as the deputy director general of the Beijing-based World Dance Education Alliance. He has previously served on the DCMS Dance Forum, the board of Bird College, chair of the CUKAS Advisory Group for Universities & Colleges Admissions, on HEFCE’s Teaching Quality and Student Experience Strategic Committee and the Mayor of London's Cultural Strategy Group. He has been visiting chair of Dance for Lasalle College of the Arts in Singapore and visiting professor at City, University of London. He is also an Honorary Fellow of Trinity College, London.
