= Adam Mansfield =

English cricketer (born 1991)

Personal information
- Full name: Adam Peter Mansfield
- Born: 21 August 1991 (age 35); Bury St Edmunds, Suffolk, England
- Batting: Right-handed
- Role: Wicket-keeper

Domestic team information
- Years: Team
- 2011–2019: Suffolk
- 2014: Cambridge MCCU

Career statistics
Competition	First-class
Matches	2
Runs scored	38
Batting average	12.66
100s/50s	0/0
Top score	31*
Catches/stumpings	6/0
- Source: Cricinfo, 11 July 2019

Adam Peter Mansfield (born 21 August 1991) is an English former first-class cricketer.

Mansfield was born at Bury St Edmunds in August 1991. He was educated at the Colchester Institute, before going up to Anglia Ruskin University. While studying at Anglia Ruskin, he made two appearances in first-class cricket for Cambridge MCCU in 2014, against Surrey and Essex. He scored 38 runs in these matches, with a high score of 31 not out. In addition to playing first-class cricket, Mansfield also played minor counties cricket for Suffolk from 2011 to 2019, making 31 appearances in the Minor Counties Championship, eighteen appearances in the MCCA Knockout Trophy, and sixteen appearances in the Minor Counties T20.
