= Andrew Matthews-Owen =

Welsh pianist

Andrew Matthews-Owen is a leading Welsh pianist and accompanist, born in Neath, Wales, now residing in London. He has been described by BBC Music magazine as "an immaculate accompanist) and is known for his work with some of the UK's leading singers, both on the concert platform and on recordings and broadcasts for BBC Radio 3; including Patricia Bardon, Claire Booth, Susan Bickley, Susan Bullock, Lucy Crowe, Anne Sophie Duprels, Rebecca Evans (soprano), Helen Field, Natalya Romaniw, Nicky Spence, Elin Manahan Thomas and Sir Willard White.

Matthews-Owen is acknowledged as an exponent of contemporary music, giving first performances of works by composers including Jonathan Dove, Alun Hoddinott, Michael Berkeley, Augusta Read Thomas, Hannah Kendall, Charlotte Bray, Joseph Phibbs, Simon Holt and others.

Matthews-Owen's award-winning discography covers art song and solo piano recordings for major record labels including Naxos, NMC and Nimbus, and holds many first recordings by composers from Louis Durey (Les Six), Guy Ropartz and Gabriel Grovlez to Jonathan Dove, Hannah Kendall and Dobrinka Tabakova.

Matthews-Owen studied at London's Royal Academy of Music, winning numerous awards and prizes, and was elected an honorary Associate; he studied as an undergraduate at Cardiff University's School of Music. Matthews-Owen has studied with Christine Croshaw, Michael Pollock and Roger Vignoles amongst other mentors. He has also received the Sir Henry Richardson Award for Accompanists, the John Ireland Trust Prize and Elisabeth Schumann Lieder Award. Matthews-Owen received the Leo Abse and Cohen Award from the Welsh Music Guild for his Contribution to Welsh Music and support of Welsh composers in concerts and on recordings, particularly the music of Alun Hoddinott.

He is a member of the professorial staff at Trinity Laban Conservatoire of Music and Dance where he leads the conservatoire's chamber music activities.
