= Henry George Bonavia Hunt =

British Anglican cleric and music educator (1847–1917)

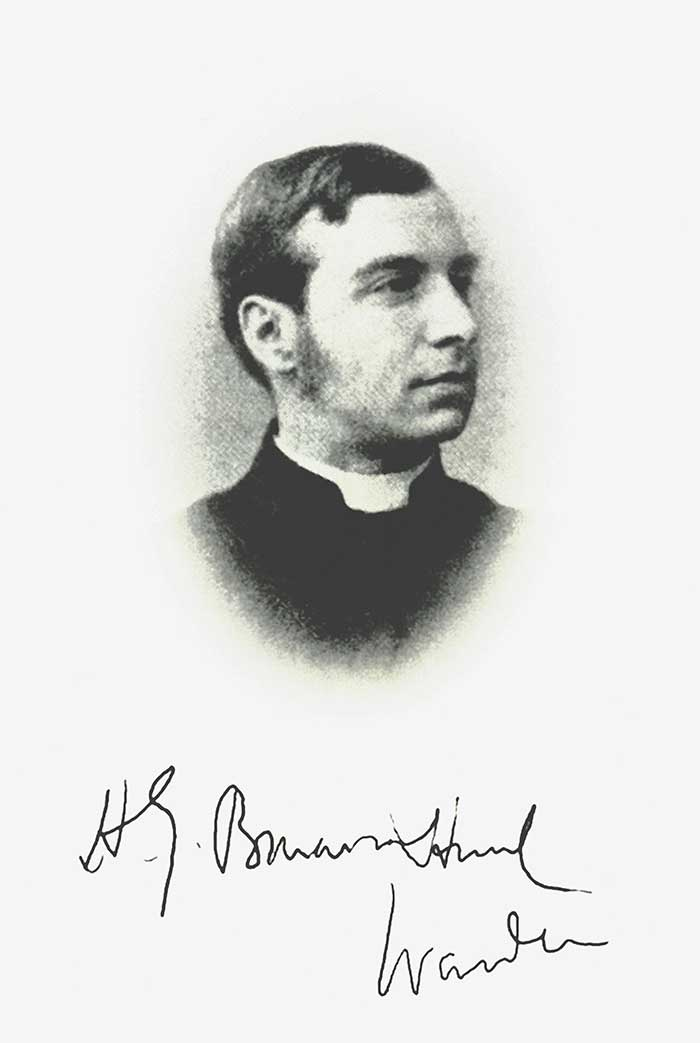
- Born: 30 June 1847; Valletta
- Died: 27 September 1917
- Resting place: St John the Evangelist's Church
- Occupations: Music educator, clergyman
- Awards: Fellowship of the Royal Society of Edinburgh

Rev Henry George Bonavia Hunt FRSE FRAS FLS (30 June 1847 – 27 September 1917) was a British Anglican cleric and the founder of the Trinity College of Music in London.

== Life ==
He was a British subject born on 30 July 1847 in Valletta, Malta, the son of William Hunt, who was engaged there as both private secretary and lay vicar to the Bishop of Jerusalem. His mother was Marietta Bonavia, a local woman. His paternal grandfather, also William Hunt, born 1790 in Sutton, Suffolk, was a brush maker. He was educated privately. He studied music firstly at Christ Church, Oxford, graduating B.Mus. in 1876; and then at the Trinity College, Dublin where he gained a doctorate (Mus.D.).

Hunt was ordained in the Church of England in 1878. At first he was a curate in Surrey and later became warden of Trinity College. He was then Curate of St James Piccadilly in London. He then began lecturing in the History of Music at London University. His final role was as Rector of Burgess Hill School, a girls' school in Sussex.

Hunt was the editor of Cassell's Magazine from 1874 to 1896, and was a regular correspondent of the Musical Times. In 1886, he was elected a Fellow of the Royal Society of Edinburgh for his contributions to musical education. His proposers were William Garden Blaikie, John Stuart Blackie, Hugh Macmillan and William Durham. He died on 27 September 1917. He is buried with his wife, Madeline (1853-1937), in the churchyard of St John the Evangelist in Burgess Hill.

== Trinity College of Music ==
In 1872 Hunt founded the Church Choral Society, with object the promotion of higher standards of church music. He engaged the help of a number of organists and choirmasters, including E. J. Hopkins, Goss and Richard Willing (later of All Saints' Margaret Street). By the following year the society was known as the College of Church Music and a system of examinations (the forerunners of the present LTCL and FTCL) was in place. In 1876 the college was incorporated as Trinity College of Music.

In 1878 the Masonic Lodge Trinity College Lodge No. 1765 of the United Grand Lodge of England, beginning the college's association with Freemasonry. William Ewart Gladstone was involved in the college in its early years.

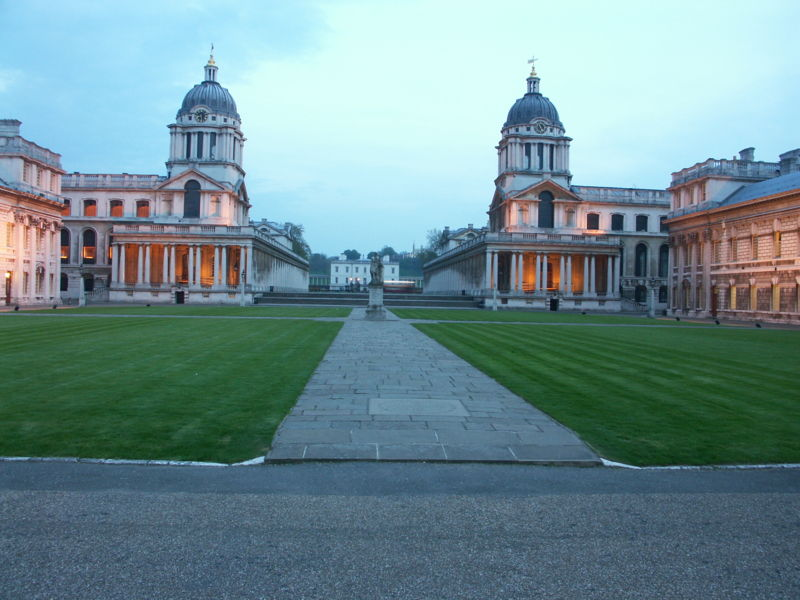
Trinity College of Music today at the Old Royal Naval College in Greenwich

== Publications ==
- A Concise History of Music (1878)

== Family ==
Hunt married in 1870 Louisa Madeline Carless, daughter of the industrialist Eugene Beauharnais Carless (c.1815–1895). They had two sons and two daughters. The children included:

- Rev. Noel Aubrey Bonavia-Hunt (born 1883), writer on organs and organ building.
- Dorothy A. Bonavia-Hunt, a daughter, author.
