= Issie Barratt =

British composer

- Born: 29 November 1964 (age 61)
- Genres: Jazz, Big band, Avant-garde
- Occupations: Bandleader, composer, educator
- Instrument: Baritone saxophone
- Years active: 1998 - present
- Website: issiebarratt.com

Issie Barratt (born 29 November 1964) is a British composer, known for her work in Big Band jazz and jazz education.

== Career ==
Barratt was awarded commissions by the Philharmonia Orchestra, The Orchestra of the Age of Enlightenment, Bohuslän Big Band, The PRS Foundation for New Music, Delta Sax Quartet, 4th Dimension String Quartet, Voice of the North, North Cheshire Wind Orchestra, Vortex Foundation Big Band, Swiss Gemeinderat of Unterägeri, Trinity College of Music's Contemporary Jazz Ensemble, Conservatoires UK Big Band and Youth Music with performances featuring artists such as Anders Bergcrantz, Tim Garland, Mark Lockheart, Joe Locke, Dennis Rollins, Carl Rütti, Steve Waterman and Annie Whitehead.

=== Educator ===
Barratt established Trinity College of Music's Jazz Faculty in 1999, which she led until 2006, before holding the position of Senior Jazz Fellow until 2012. As well as directing ensembles from Trinity College of Music, Barratt co-directed the Conservatoires UK Big Band 2003-2008 performing annually at Leeds College of Music's International Jazz conference (alongside fellow artists and educators Bob Mintzer, Tim Garland, Mike Hall, Julian Joseph, Gerard Presencer, Mike Gibbs and Mark Donlon). She appeared with CUK Big Band Tim Garland the International Association of Jazz Educators's Conference in 2008.

Barratt led various projects at the Royal Academy of Music, the Royal Northern College of Music and the Royal College of Music, contributed to the Associated Board of the Royal Schools of Music's jazz syllabi and wrote research papers on jazz related topics.

In September 2006 Barratt took the position of Founding Artistic Director for the National Youth Jazz Collective. Barratt is an active Board Director of the British Academy of Composers and Songwriters (BASCA) and chairs BASCA's Jazz Committee, She is a jazz adjudicator for Music for Youth's annual national festival. Barratt is the founding director of Fuzzy Moon Records. She was winner of Jazz Educator of the Year at the 2014 Parliamentary Awards.

== Discography ==
=== Leader ===
- 2008: Astral Pleasures (Fuzzy Moon Records)
- 2011: Meinrad Iten Suite (Fuzzy Moon Records)

=== Other ===
- 2008: Letter to Billie - Bohuslän Big Band (Track: Strange Fruit)
- 2007: Dedicated to You ... But You Weren't Listening: The Music of Soft Machine - Delta Saxophone Quartet (Track: Somehow with the passage of time)
