= La revue de cuisine =

La revue de cuisine (H 161, Czech: Kuchyňská revue) is a ballet in one act by Czech composer Bohuslav Martinů. It was created for sextet: clarinet (B♭), bassoon, trumpet, violin, cello and piano, composed in 1927. It was premiered in November 1927 in Prague. The suite drawn from the ballet was premiered in January 1930, in Paris.

== Work ==
In response to a commission by Božena Nebeská and to a scenario by Jarmila Kröschlová, Martinů wrote a witty curtain-raiser called Pokušení svatouška hrnce (Temptation of the Saintly Pot) and with it scored his first popular success under the revised title La Revue de cuisine. Here the dancers play a variety of cooking utensils which swagger their way through a naïve episode of kitchen life. The marriage of Pot and Lid is in danger of being broken up by the suave Twirling Stick. Pot succumbs to his flattery. Dishcloth makes eyes at Lid but is challenged to a duel by Broom. Pot, however, tires of Twirling Stick and longs for Lid's caresses, but Lid cannot be found anywhere. Suddenly an enormous foot appears from the wings and kicks him back on stage. Pot and Lid kiss and make up and, flirting once again, Twirling Stick goes off with Dishcloth.

== Structure ==
The ballet is in ten movements:

1. Prologue (Allegretto)
2. Introduction (Tempo de marche)
3. Danse du moulinet autour du caudron (Poco meno)
4. Danse du chaudron et du couvercle (Allegro)
5. Tango (Danse d'amour. Lento)
6. Duel (Poco a poco allegro. Tempo di Charleston)
7. Entracte (Lamentation du chaudron. Allegro moderato)
8. Marche funèbre (Adagio)
9. Danse radieuse (Tempo di marche)
10. Fin du drame (Allegretto)

The suite is in four movements: Prologue, Tango, Charleston, and Final.

The score for the suite was published in Paris shortly after its premiere. The full score for the ballet was discovered in the early 1990s in the archives of the Paul Sacher Foundation in Basel and published in Paris in 2004.

The music involves complex time schemes – for example the Final, which involves an opening piano solo marked "Tempo di marcia". This section switches between 2/4, 3/8 and 4/8 in an almost unpredictable fashion, generating the desired rhythmical offbeats typical of the jazz of the period.

Further jazz influences are seen in the instrumentation: the piano using rich harmony and dissonance, the muted trumpet reminiscent of the jazz bands of the era, and the repeated use of pizzicato in the cello part, echoing the use of the double bass in jazz.

This is a progressive piece of music which helps to draw the link between early and mid twentieth-century music.

== Selected recordings ==
- Czech Philharmonic Orchestra, cond. Christopher Hogwood. Supraphon 2004. SU 3749-2 031
- Bohuslav Martinů: La Revue de Cuisine, Nonet, Three Madrigals, and other chamber music, The Dartington Ensemble (leader: Oliver Butterworth) (2 CDs, Hyperion Dyad, 1998)
- Holst Sinfonietta, Klaus Simon Naxos 2012
