= Jarmila Kröschlová =

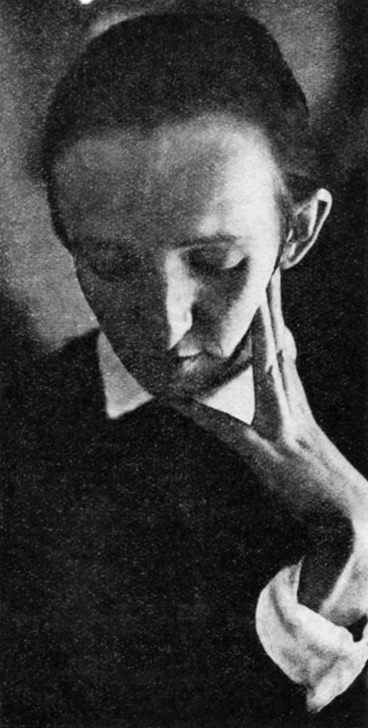
- circa 1925
- Born: 19 March 1893; Prague, Austria-Hungary
- Died: 9 January 1983 (aged 89); Prague, Czechoslovakia
- Other name: Jarmila Schürer-Kröschlová
- Occupations: dancer, choreographer, librettist
- Years active: 1921–1970
- Known for: development of movement theories in the Czech Republic

Jarmila Kröschlová (19 March 1893 – 9 January 1983) was one of the most important representatives of modern dance in Czechoslovakia. She was one of the leading European expressionist dancers and as a choreographer had wide influence on other dancers, through her teaching and theoretical writings on dance. Working with the Czech avant-garde theater, producing librettos and as a professor in the Theatre Faculty of the Academy of Performing Arts in Prague, she advanced modern dance and pantomime with her theories of movement.

== Early life ==
Jarmila Kröschlová was born on 19 March 1893 in Prague, which at the time, was part of the Austro-Hungarian Empire to Božena (née Marešová) and Alois Kröschel. Alois owned a factory in Prague which created large machinery. As a child, Kröschlová developed tuberculosis and at the age of ten, went to Alassio in Italy to recover. From a young age, she wanted to be a performer and when she returned from Italy in 1916, she began studying with Helena Vojáčková, who taught movement based on the Mensendieck system at the Émile Jaques-Dalcroze Society in Prague. Completing her studies in 1919, Kröschlová then went to Geneva to study directly with Dalcroze and upon his recommendation, then studied at his school in Hellerau near Dresden until 1921. Her studies were not in traditional dance, but based more on rhythmic movements and gymnastics. After studying with Dalcroze, she completed self-study on the work of Isadora Duncan and Rudolf von Laban.

== Career ==
In 1921, Kröschlová began her career in the dance troupe of Valerie Kratina in Hellerau and worked on a collaborative production with Jeanem Bardem, a poet, called Mluva pohybu (The Motion of Movement). The program was an interdisciplinary presentation with recitations by Bardem and dance by Kröschlová, which was successfully performed in Florence, Geneva, Prague and Rome. In 1923, she founded the Jarmila Kröschlová Group in Hellerau and taught dance. She began writing and choreographing that same year, producing a libretto for music by Franz Schreker's Der Geburtstag der Infantin, based on The Birthday of the Infanta by Oscar Wilde. Returning to Prague the following year to established her company there, Kröschlová began collaborating with some of the leading avant-garde directors of the Dada theatre movement, including Emil František Burian, Jiří Frejka, Karel Hugo Hilar and Jindřich Honzl. She was one of the founders of the Modern Studio in Prague and her choreographic style was more similar to mime or physical theater than classical dance. In 1924, she married Oskar Schürer, a German professor of art history, who had followed her from Germany to Prague. The couple had a daughter in 1926, Eva, who would also become a noted dancer.

Kröschlová danced the role of the Harlequin in her 1926 choreography of Hračkové skříňky (The Toy Boxes) and the following year wrote the libretto and choreography for Bohuslav Martinů's La Revue de Cuisine (The Kitchen Revue). The Charleston and Foxtrot numbers she staged for the production are some of the most acclaimed and requested for encore by audiences. In 1928, she choreographed Obrazy z velkoměsta (Images from the City) to music by Modest Mussorgsky and the following year, she danced to two pieces by Saša Machov Marionety (Marionettes) and Čarodějná láska (Love of the Witch). Between 1929 and 1930, she choreographed a series of dances, in which she also performed, to the music of Bach, Beethoven and others. In 1930, she danced in Loupežník (Robbers) by Machov and the following year performed in the role of Pierot in Nikolai Evreinov's Veselá smrt (Merry Death). That same year, she wrote the libretto and choreography for a piece called Zelené flétny (Green Flute) based on a theme by Mozart.

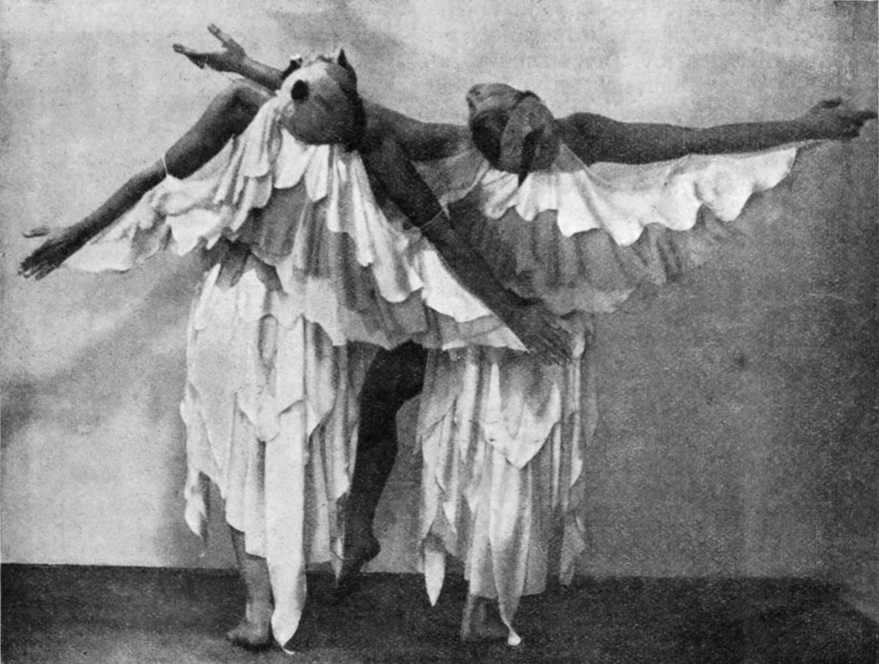
Kröschlová, Evening of a Steamy Day, 1932

In 1931, Kröschlová opened her own dance teaching studio at the Phoenix Palace and throughout the 1930s taught children's dance classes with a focus on folk dance. The following year, her dance company took the bronze medal at the Académie Internationale de le Danse's exposition in Paris with choreography and the libretto Kröschlová wrote for Podvečer parného dne (The Evening of a Steamy Day) by Václav Smetáček. In 1936, she played the title role of Kolumba in a feature-length dance drama, using her ideas on the theater of motion, to music written by E. Hohag and a libretto by Miloš Hlávka. In October 1937, the family moved to Munich, where Oskar had been offered a position as a professor at the Ludwig-Maximilians-Universität München. Finding the conditions under the Nazi regime intolerable, they returned to Prague ten months later and divorced in 1939.

During the German occupation of Czechoslovakia, Kröschlová was a member of the Resistance Group of Věrni. She escaped detection for her activities, but her sister Naděžda, known as Naďa was arrested. In 1940, she wrote the libretto and choreographed Škola žen (School of Women) by František Bartoš and Královničky by Jaroslav Teklý. She created folk dancing performances based on Slavic and Christmas customs between 1942 and 1944 and in 1943, played the role of Runa in the stage play Radúz and Mahulena by Julius Zeyer. Between 1949 and 1958, she taught at the Academy of Performing Arts and though she continued to work as a consultant to various theater groups, Kröschlová's last choreographic work was for a production of Legends by Antonín Dvořák, staged in 1950 at the Theater of Music.

In the 1950s, besides her professorial lectures, Kröschlová began publishing works on folk dancing and in that year became an editor of the journal, Tanečních listů (Dance Lists). She published Základy pohybové výchovy tanečníka a herce (Basic Movements of a Dancer and Actor) in 1956, Výrazový tanec (Expressive Dance) in 1964, and Nauka o pohybu in 1975, which was translated and released in English as Movement Theory and Practice in 2000. Her books were theoretical works on movement, rather than specific guides for creating modern dance. They focused on the importance of stillness to create the body's preparation for kinaesthetic awareness to create and perform. She retired in 1970 and withdrew from the public.

== Death and legacy ==
Kröschlová died on 9 January 1983 in Prague. In 2008, her work Expressive Dance was translated into German and published as Der Ausdrucktanz by her daughter. In 2013, a symposium was held at the Music and Dance Faculty of the Academy of Performing Arts (Czech: Hudební a taneční fakulta Akademie múzických umění v Praze (HAMU)), to mark Kröschlová's 120th birthday and recognize her contributions as "one of the most important representatives of modern dance in Bohemia".
