= Helen Bower =

British violinist

Helen Bower (born 1985) is a British-born violinist and sound artist. She is known for her experimentation with violin and loop station, particularly through her "...the Looping Glass" series. Whilst living in Melbourne, Australia, she was President of the Victorian Youth Symphony Orchestra in 2015.

== Career ==
Bower was born in Chichester, and raised in Norwich, England. She studied at Trinity Laban Conservatoire of Music and Dance playing in masterclasses for others including Natalie Clein, Wihan Quartet and Pieter Schoeman. After learning under teachers such as Karl Lutchmayer, Bower was awarded the Vivian Prindl Outreach Prize for her collaborative piece of work "In the Loop".

Bower had an early professional experience with The English Concert, TCM Sinfonia and Dartington International Summer School Festival Orchestra - playing under the conductorship of Sir Charles Mackerras and Diego Masson.

=== Move to Australia (2012–present) ===
In 2012, Bower moved to Melbourne, Australia. Working with composers Max Perryment, Grace Huie Robbins, Charles MacInnes and Ade Vincent, Bower created and debuted "Through the Looping Glass" at the 2014 Melbourne Fringe Festival before touring Fringe World, Perth and the Adelaide Fringe Festival in early 2015. The show was well received.

Bower continued to collaborate with MacInnes and debuted "Lost in the Looping Glass" at the 2015 Melbourne Fringe Festival
