= John Bingham (pianist) =

British classical pianist

John Bingham (31 March 1942 – 6 December 2003) was a British classical pianist. He was born and died in Sheffield, Yorkshire.

Notable students include Peter Arnold and Irina Lyakhovskaya.

== Discography ==
- JOHN BINGHAM PLAYS CHOPIN: Sonata No.2, Andante Spianato & Grande Polonaise, 2 Ètudes Db, Nocturne. Meridian Records
- LUDWIG VAN BEETHOVEN: Diabelli Variations Op. 120, Theme and Six Variations Op. 34. Meridian Records
- LUDWIG VAN BEETHOVEN: Fantasie Op. 77, Sonata Op. 78, Eroica Variations Op. 35, Sonata Op. 111. Meridian Records
- BOHEMIAN VIOLIN: Suk, Janaçek, Kubelik, Drdla, Nedbal, Dvorak, Fibich. Oliver Butterworth/J.Bingham. Meridian Records
- SCHUBERT SONGS ARRANGED BY LISZT. Meridian Records
- BEETHOVEN: Piano Concertos Nos 4 and 5. J.Bingham/Singapore Symphony Orchestra/Ch.Hoey. Meridian Records
- CHOPIN: Etudes Opus 10 & 25. Meridian Records
- ELGAR: Piano Quintet. J.Bingham/Medici String Quartet. Meridian Records
- SCHUMANN: Sinfonische Etüden. Bayer Records
- LISZT: Mephisto Pieces. Thorophon Records
- LISZT: Malediction. J.Bingham/Ensemble 13/M.Reichert. Deutsche Harmonia Mundi
- SCHUBERT: Quintet The Trout. J.Bingham/Zeus Ensemble. Cirrus Records
- SCHLEGEL: Piano Quartet. J.Bingham/E.Perry/P.Pacey/D.Ferschtmann. NM Classics
