= Graduate of Trinity College of Music, London =

UK conservatory degree

The Graduate of Trinity College of Music, London diploma (GTCL) (equivalent to a university first degree) was part of a model that all the mainline British conservertoires followed and was open to internal students of the college after final examination and successful public recital within the usual honours structure. Candidates followed a three or four-year course including first and second instrumental or vocal studies, harmony and counterpoint, aural training, history and analysis, conducting, composition and arrangement, and an academic thesis. The Royal College and the Royal Academy of Music followed a similar model, awarding the GRSM diploma. The Royal Northern College of Music also awarded the diploma GRSM (Manchester), and the Guildhall School of Music and Drama, awarded the GGSM diploma. The mainline British conservatoires of music phased out the professional graduate diplomas during the 1990s in favour of a BMus model. Trinity College London awarded the last GTCL diploma in 1997.

The LTCL diploma, open to all students of the college in either instrumental teaching or performing was usually taken by examination in the second year of the GTCL course. The LTCL diploma remains as an external diploma, validated by Trinity College London.

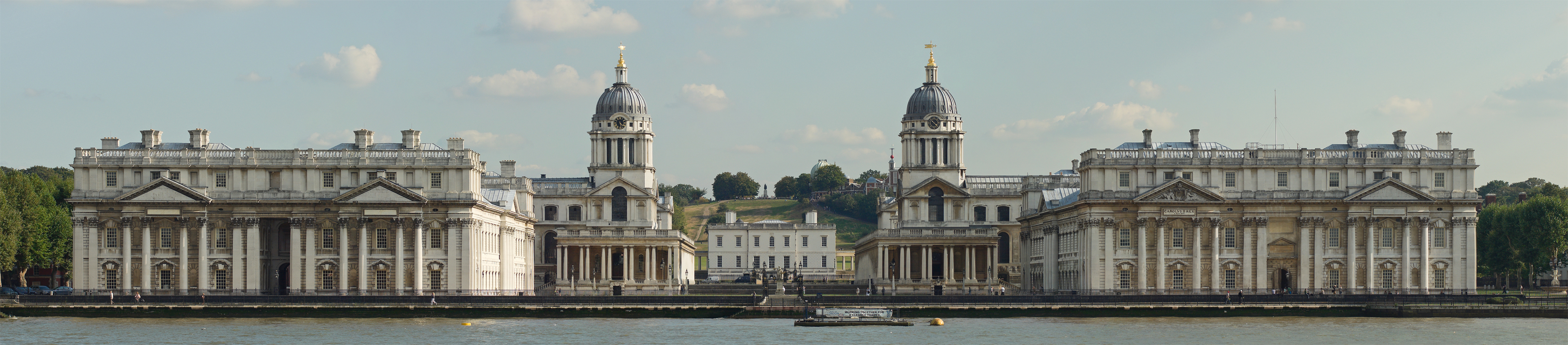
Trinity College of Music (now part of the Trinity Laban Conservatoire of Music and Dance) in its Wren building the Old Royal Naval College on the River Thames in Greenwich, London, viewed from the north side. The Queen's House is in the middle of the picture. The Royal Observatory is visible in the background.

== Qualified teacher status ==
The GTCL professional graduate diploma of Trinity College of Music, London (awarded by Trinity College London), together with a number of other professional graduate diplomas from the British Conservatoires of Music, fulfil special requirements for Qualified Teacher Status, under the Education (School Teachers' Qualifications) (England) 2003. Those awarded the professional graduate diploma are entitled to use the post-nominal letters GTCL or GTCL (Hons), as appropriate, and to wear the appropriate academic dress: black bachelors' gown with hood of purple silk of full Cambridge shape, all edges bound with violet silk.
