= Oliver Butterworth (violinist) =

British violinist

Oliver Butterworth, ARAM is a British violinist, music educator, and arts administrator.

== Biography ==
Butterworth entered the Royal Academy of Music in 1965 as Sterndale Bennett Scholar and studied with Manoug Parikian. He then studied at the Prague Conservatory with Jaroslav Pekelský and later with Viktor Lieberman in Rotterdam.

He joined the English Chamber Orchestra in 1971 and was appointed leader of the Dartington Ensemble and Piano Trio in 1981.

Butterworth was senior lecturer at Dartington College of Arts and later professor of violin at Trinity College of Music from 1989 until 2008. He was artistic director of the London Schools Symphony Orchestra from 1990 until 2001.

Butterworth is artistic director of Al Farabi Concerto.

In 2002 Butterworth was appointed an Associate of the Royal Academy of Music.

== Discography ==
- Bohuslav Martinů: La Revue de Cuisine, Nonet, Three Madrigals, and other chamber music, The Dartington Ensemble (2 CDs, Hyperion Dyad, 1998)
- Bohemian Violin, with John Bingham (piano) (Meridian Records, 1999)
- Frank Bridge: Phantasie Trio, Phantasy Quartet, and Piano Trio No. 2, The Dartington Trio with Patrick Ireland (Helios, 2001)
- Fanny Mendelssohn and Clara Schumann: Piano Trios, The Dartington Piano Trio (Helios, 2001)
- Butterworth has also contributed to a recording of music by Frank Denyer

== Sources ==
- Arab British Centre: About Us: Who We Are: Trustees: Oliver Butterworth. Accessed 11 June 2012.
- Arab British Centre: What We Offer: Awards: 2011 Award. Accessed 11 June 2012.
- Riyadh Group for British Business News (Spring 2010), p. 30. Accessed 11 June 2012.
- Brunel Institute for Contemporary Middle Eastern Music: About the Research Centre. Accessed 11 June 2012.
