= Victorian Youth Symphony Orchestra =

The Victorian Youth Symphony Orchestra (VYSO) is an Australian youth orchestra based in Melbourne, Victoria. It comprises musicians under the age of 30.

== History ==
The orchestra was established in 1942 as the Victorian Junior Symphony Orchestra, serving as a training ensemble for school-aged musicians. It was initially run by the state government-supported Victorian State Schools Bands Association (later renamed the Victorian Schools' Music Association).

In the 1980s, it became an independent community ensemble aimed primarily at post-school musicians, changing its name to the Victorian Youth Symphony Orchestra. The VYSO was the recipient of the Victoria Day Award for the Arts in 2005.

In 2012, Patrick Burns was appointed conductor of the orchestra. In the 2013 concert season, the orchestra collaborated with Monash University Choral Society to mark Giuseppe Verdi's 200th birthday. In 2014, the orchestra performed a very special tribute to musical educator John Hopkins, at South Melbourne Town Hall.

For the 2015 concert season, the orchestra appointed Ingrid Martin as conductor and Helen Bower as president. Performances included 'Battlefronts', a Gallipoli Campaign-inspired charity concert to mark the 100th anniversary of the landing at ANZAC Cove

== See also ==
- List of youth orchestras
