= Graduate of the Royal Schools of Music =

Professional diploma

Graduate of the Royal Schools of Music (GRSM) was a professional diploma of graduate status (equivalent to a university first degree) that was open to both internal students of the Royal Academy of Music and the Royal College of Music after joint examination. Candidates followed a three-year course including: first and second instrumental or vocal studies, harmony and counterpoint, aural training, history and analysis, conducting, composition and arrangement, and an academic thesis. The former Royal Manchester College of Music, now the Royal Northern College of Music, also awarded the diploma GRSM (Manchester). The graduate diploma awarded in London was phased out in the 1990s. When the Royal Academy became a full college of the University of London, the GRSM, along with the non-graduate Performers' Course, was replaced by the award of the BMus (London) for all successful undergraduate students. The Royal College of Music devised its own BMus course which (uniquely among conservatories) it was entitled by Royal Charter to award. The other mainline British music colleges followed a similar model: Trinity College of Music awarded the GTCL graduate diploma and the Guildhall School of Music and Drama the GGSM diploma. Like the GRSM, they have been replaced.

The Licentiate of the Royal Academy of Music diploma, open to all students of the Royal Academy of Music, in either instrumental teaching or performing was usually taken by examination in the second year of the GRSM course. Similarly the ARCM was a requirement at the college for those taking the GRSM.

Those awarded the Graduate Diploma (by the Royal Academy and Royal College) are entitled to use the post-nominal letters GRSM (London) and to wear the appropriate academic dress: black bachelors' gown with scarlet silk hood of full Cambridge shape, the cowl part-lined 3 inches and bound 1/4 inch with royal blue silk, the neckband fully lined and bound 1/4 inch of royal blue silk.
