= Trinity Laban Conservatoire of Music and Dance =

Music and dance school in London, England

Coordinates: 51.4800°N 0.0100°W

Trinity Laban
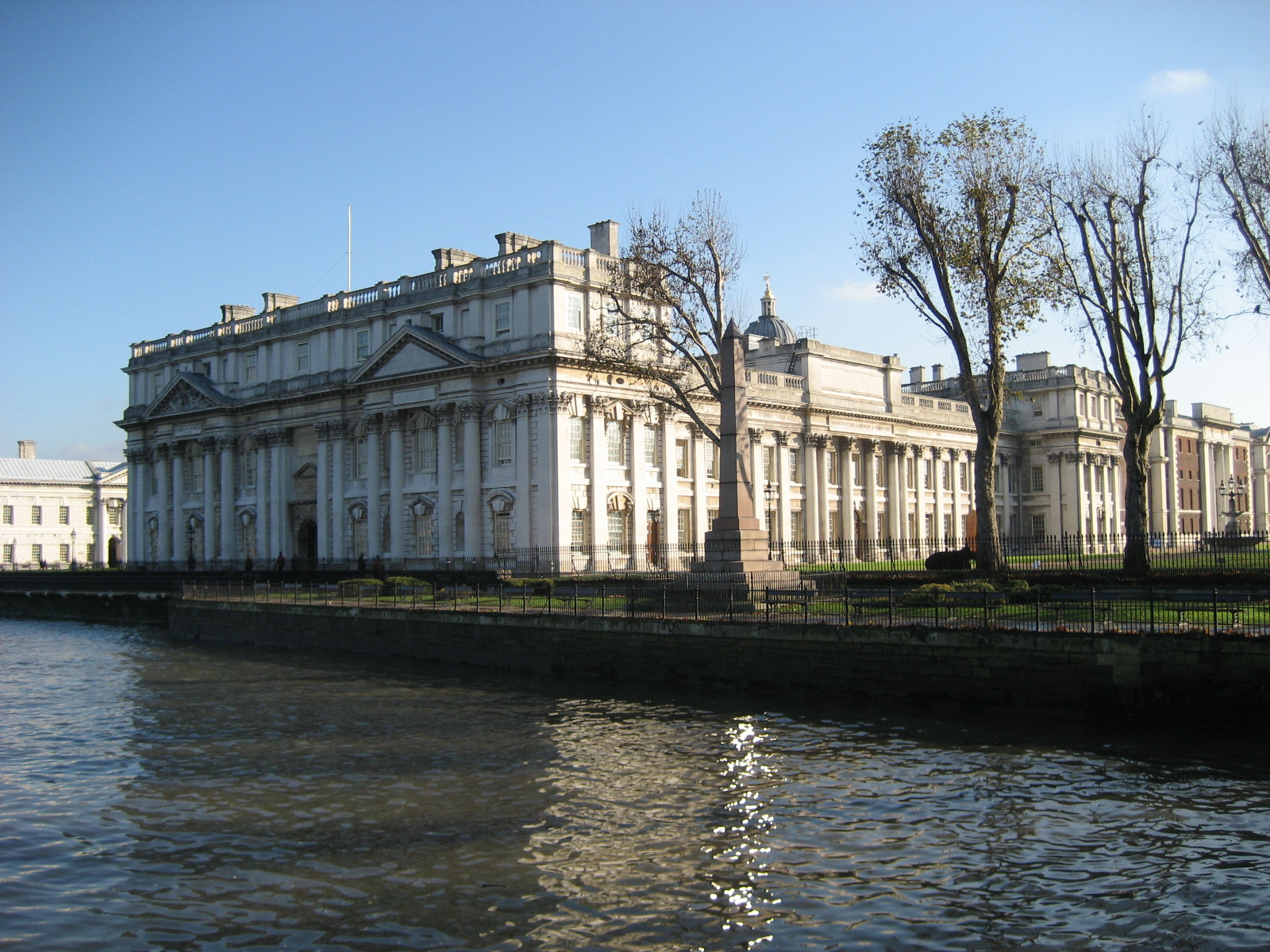
- King Charles Court (Music)
- Former name: Trinity College of Music
- Motto: Tradition meets tomorrow
- Type: Conservatoire
- Established: 2005 – merger of Trinity College of Music and Laban Dance Centre; 1872 – founding of Trinity College of Music
- Founder: Henry George Bonavia Hunt
- Affiliations: Conservatoires UK (CUK)
- Academic affiliations: European Association of Conservatoires
- Endowment: £6.7 million (2020)
- Chairman: Alan Davey
- President: A. R. Rahman
- Principal: Anthony Bowne
- Patron: The Duke of Kent
- Students: 1,315 (2024/25)
- Undergraduates: 965 (2024/25)
- Postgraduates: 350 (2024/25)
- Location: King Charles Court, Old Royal Naval College, Greenwich, SE10 9JF, London, United Kingdom
- Campus: Urban
- Website: trinitylaban.ac.uk

Trinity Laban Conservatoire of Music and Dance (Note: English: UK: /lɑːbən/) is a music, dance, and musical theatre conservatoire based in South East London. It was formed in 2005 as a merger of two older institutions – Trinity College of Music and Laban Dance Centre. Trinity Laban provides training in all aspects of classical music, jazz, popular music, composition, musical theatre, contemporary dance, dance science, choreography, and music education. The conservatoire has 1,250 undergraduate and postgraduate students based at three campuses in Greenwich, Deptford and New Cross.

Trinity Laban also runs a Centre for Advanced Training programme for young dancers aged 12 to 17 and a junior music department (Junior Trinity), designed for young musicians aged three to 19.

The conservatoire has formed academic partnerships with institutions including Beijing Dance Academy, KM Music Conservatory, and the University of Melbourne and industry partnerships include Trinity College London, Studio Wayne McGregor, and the Philharmonia Orchestra. Trinity Laban is a Member of Conservatoires UK and the European Association of Conservatoires. The principal of Trinity Laban is Professor Anthony Bowne and A. R. Rahman was announced as the conservatoire's Honorary President in 2024.

== History ==
=== Trinity College of Music ===
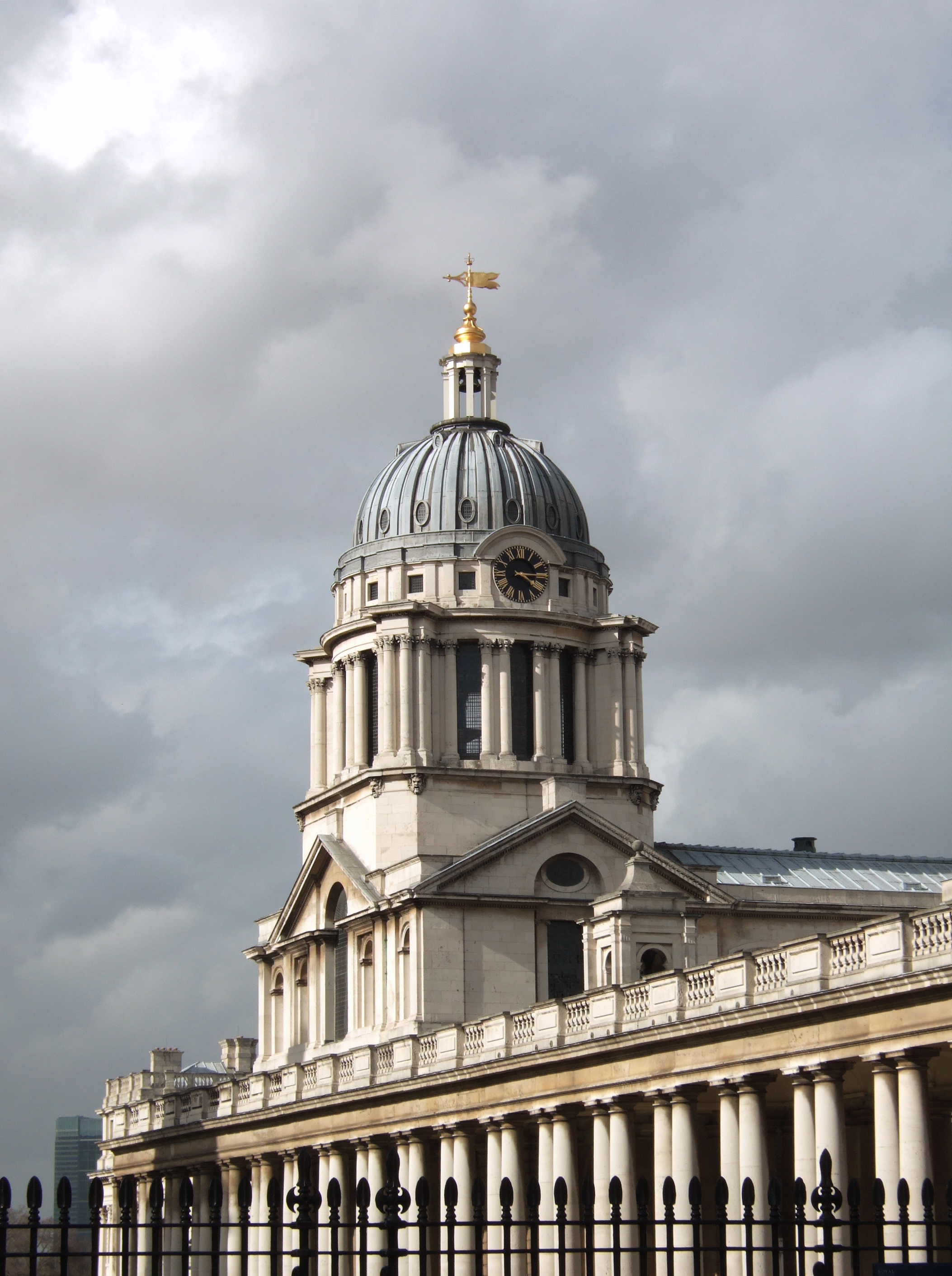
Old Royal Naval College, Queen Mary building

Trinity college of music was founded in central London on 1 June 1872 by Henry George Bonavia Hunt, an ordained priest and musician whose qualifications included a doctorate in music from Trinity College, Dublin. Initially named the Church Choral Society, the organisation's principal aim was to improve the teaching of church music. A year later, in 1873, the college became the College of Church Music, and subsequently in 1876 was incorporated as the Trinity College London. Initially, only male students could attend and they had to be members of the Church of England. The college's diverse activities in the early years included choral singing classes and teaching instruction in church music.

In 1880, the college moved to 13 Mandeville Place off Wigmore Street in central London, which remained its home for over a hundred years. Following acquisition of the neighbouring 11 Mandeville Place in 1917, the two buildings were united in 1922 through extensive structural alterations, including the addition of a Grecian portico, a first floor concert hall and an impressive staircase. The building is now occupied by the School of Philosophy and Economic Science.

The college moved to Greenwich in 2001, taking up residence in King Charles Court in the Old Royal Naval College. The east wing of King Charles Court was constructed by John Webb as part of a rebuilding of Greenwich Palace; it was subsequently absorbed into the Royal Naval Hospital complex, designed in part by Sir Christopher Wren, which had later become part of the Royal Naval College (RNC). To make the buildings suitable for Trinity's use and remove the accretions of a century of RNC occupation required a substantial refurbishment programme. Work to provide new recital rooms revealed that the building's core incorporates masonry from the Tudor palace.

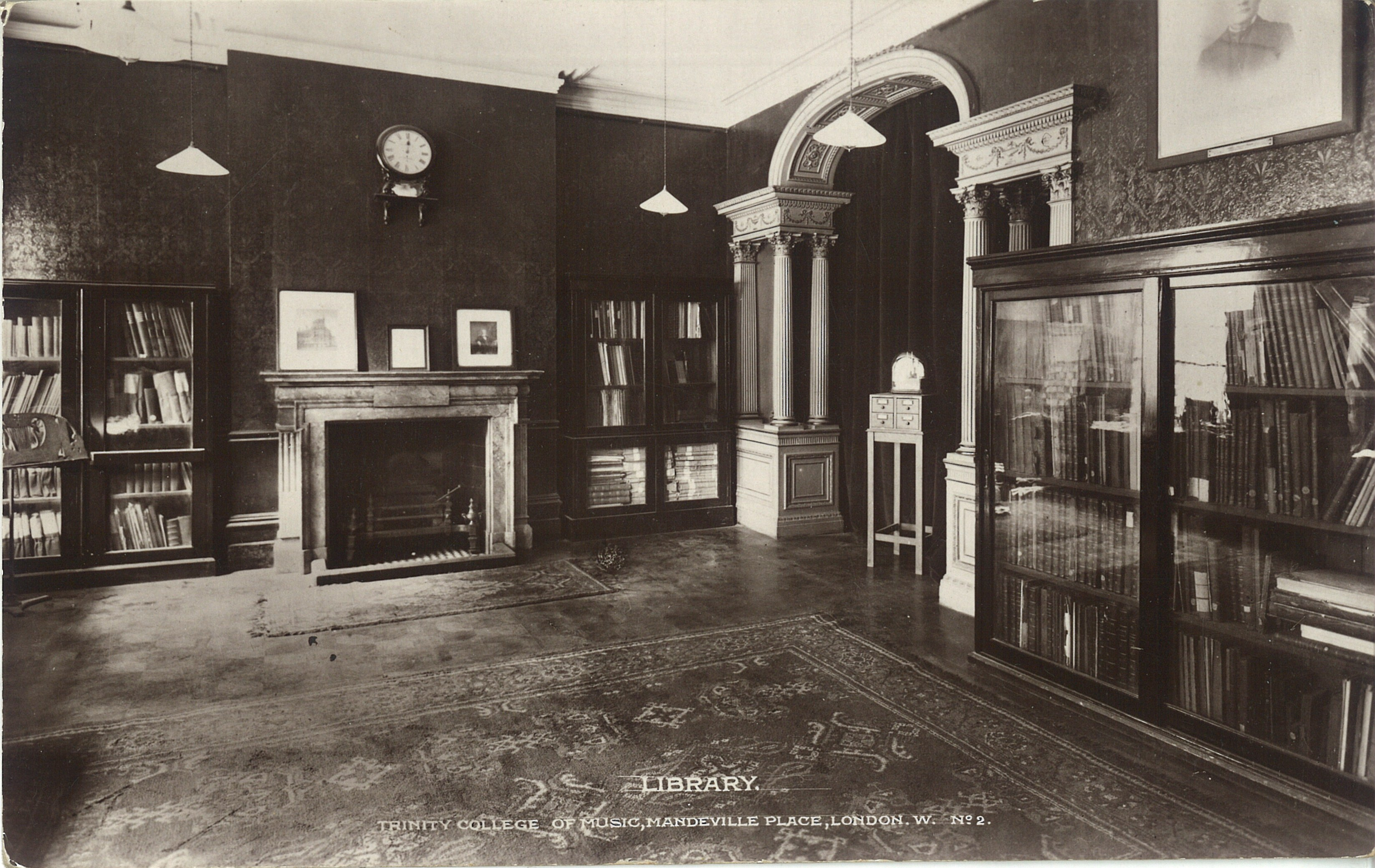
Library at Trinity College of Music, Mandeville Place, 1922

=== Trinity College London ===
Trinity College London was founded in 1877 as the external examinations board of Trinity College of Music, and administered examinations and diplomas until 1992, when the two organisations separated. Trinity College London validated Trinity College of Music's Graduate Diploma (the GTCL) before it was replaced by the BMus model in 1997. Today, the TCL's examinations are taken by students in over 60 countries, giving external students the opportunity to attain qualifications across a range of disciplines in the performing arts and arts education and English language learning and teaching. Trinity College London and Trinity Laban maintain a partnership, with Trinity College London funding scholarships.

=== Trinity College of Music's historical association with the Masonic Order ===
Trinity College of Music has a historical association with Freemasonry, with the Trinity College Lodge No 1765 being founded in 1878 by seven early teaching members of the college who were freemasons, including Henry George Bonavia Hunt. Trinity College Lodge is no longer associated with Trinity Laban. However, by co-incidence, the College's patron, the Duke of Kent, has been Grand Master of the United Grand Lodge of England since 1967.

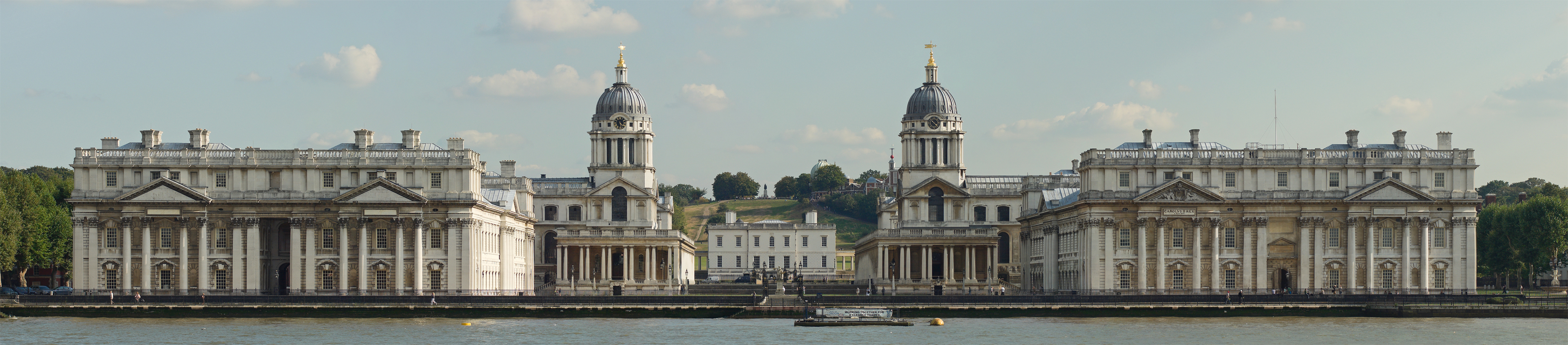
The Old Royal Naval College, on the south bank of the river Thames in Greenwich, London, viewed from the north side. The Queen's House is in the middle of the picture. The Royal Observatory is visible in the background. King Charles Court is the building in the right foreground.

Trinity Laban: The Merger

Trinity Laban Conservatoire of Music and Dance was formed by a merger in 2005 between then Trinity College of Music and then Laban Dance Centre, both organisations having moved to new sites close to each other, Greenwich and Deptford, since 2000. Trinity Laban became the first UK higher education institution focusing of music and dance. Initially led by two principals, Derek Aviss and Anthony Bowne, in 2010 Bowne took sole leadership of the conservatoire.

== Art of Movement Studio and the Laban Centre ==
=== Establishment and Early Purpose (1945–1953) ===
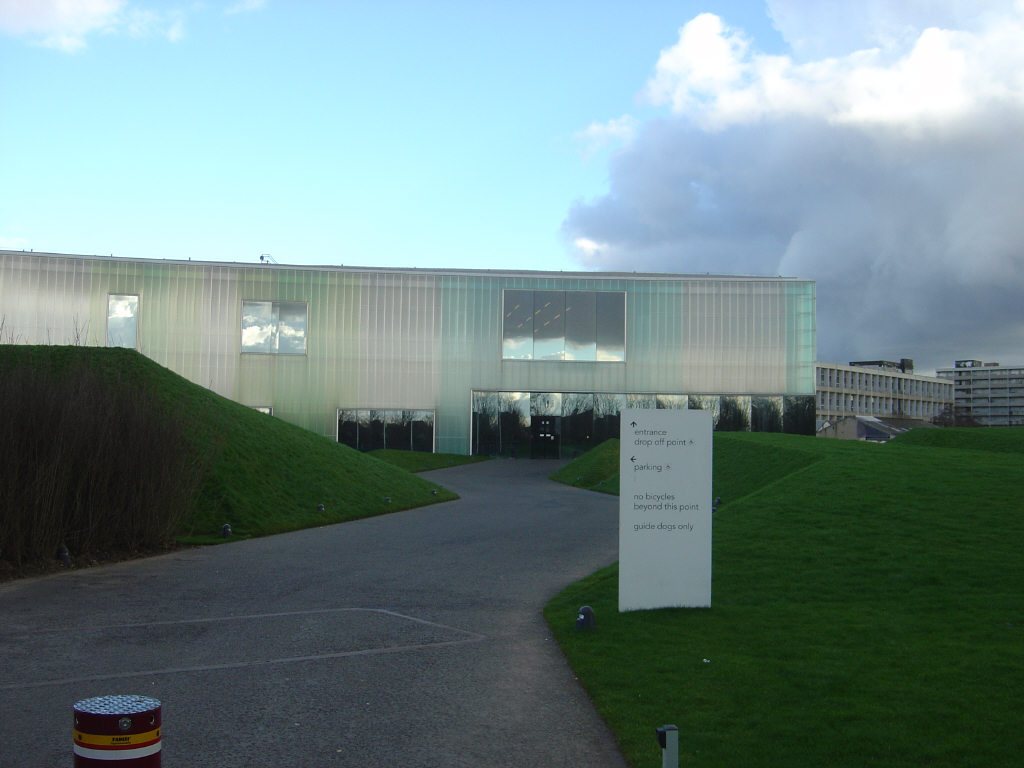
Front of the Laban Building, Deptford

The Art of Movement Studio was established in November 1945, beginning with four students in Palatine Road, Manchester. By January 1946, it had relocated to 183/5 Oxford Road. Personal memoirs suggest between 8 and 17 initial students. Instruction was provided by Lisa Ullmann, Sylvia Bodmer, and Rudolf Laban.

The founding purpose of the Studio was to serve as a teacher training institution. For the next three decades, this remained its dominant focus. However, correspondence from Lisa Ullmann suggests that the students' interests may have leaned more towards performance than education.

In 1954, the institution was renamed Laban: The Art of Movement Centre.

=== Relocation to Addlestone and Institutional Expansion (1953–1976) ===
In July 1953, the Art of Movement Studio relocated from Manchester to Addlestone in Surrey. During the 1960s and 1970s, the number of full-time students averaged just under 80 per year. A wider impact was made through short and summer courses, with participation reaching into the thousands.

The Studio offered a three-year professional training course and an additional supplementary course.

=== Transition to Goldsmiths' College and the Move to New Cross ===
According to Willson, the integration of the Art of Movement Studio into Goldsmiths' College was facilitated by political negotiations and financial backing, notably a grant from the Gulbenkian Foundation. Goldsmiths committed to relocating the Studio to newly renovated premises at Laurie Grove, New Cross, London, culminating in the move in September 1976.

=== The role of Dr. Marion North ===
Dr. Marion North played a significant role in the Studio's later development. She began her association with the Art of Movement Studio in 1951 as a student and assistant to Rudolf Laban and Lisa Ullmann. After leaving in 1958 to apply Laban's methods in industrial and community contexts, she returned to academia in the mid-1960s as Head of Movement and Dance at Sidney Webb College. In 1972, she was appointed Head of the Movement Department at Goldsmiths' College and, in 1973, succeeded Ullmann as the Director of the Art of Movement Studio.

== Notable alumni ==
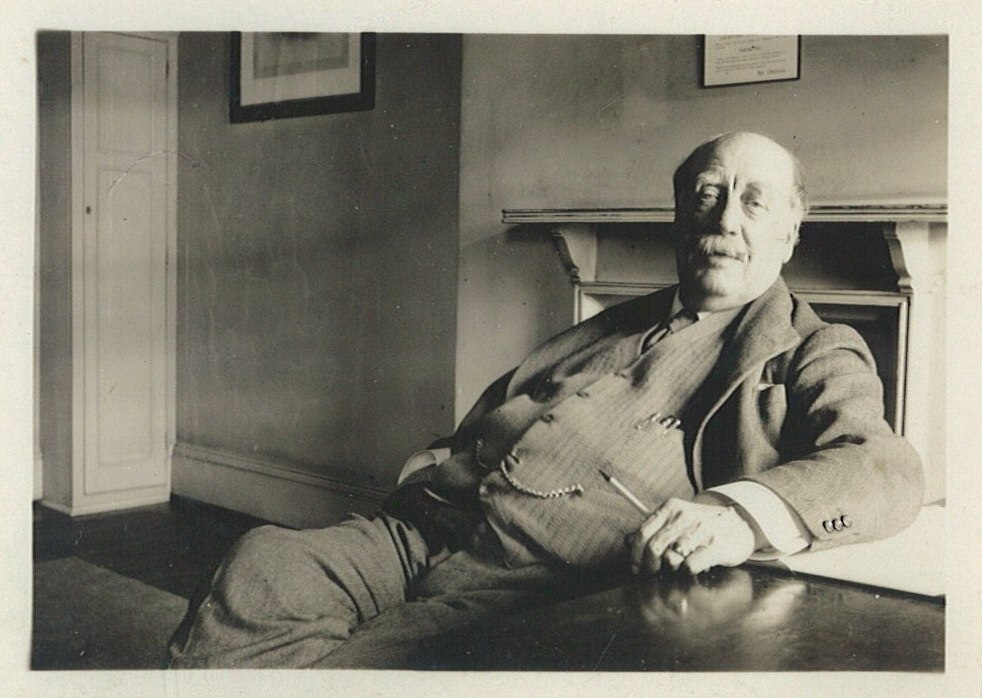
Professor John Warriner, chairman 1930–34. Taken in 1933

=== Music ===
- A. R. Rahman (composer, record producer, singer, songwriter, multi-instrumentalist)
- Robert Brydges Addison (composer)
- Howard Arman (conductor)
- Peter Arnold (pianist)
- Granville Bantock (composer)
- John Barbirolli (conductor)
- Helen Bower (violinist)
- Thomas Bowes (violinist)
- Mairéad Carlin (singer)
- Edith Coates (mezzo-soprano)
- Avril Coleridge-Taylor (pianist, conductor, composer)
- Deva (composer, singer)
- Corrie Dick (drummer, composer)
- Wilberforce Echezona, (musicologist)
- Predrag Gosta (conductor, harpsichordist)
- Gavin Greenaway (composer)
- Heather Harper (soprano)
- Stjepan Hauser (2Cellos) (cellist)
- Ilaiyaraaja (composer, singer, songwriter)
- Laura Jurd (trumpeter, composer)
- Albert Ketèlbey (composer)
- Fela Kuti (musician, activist)
- Made Kuti (musician)
- Sunny Li (pianist)
- Kate Maberly (actress, director, writer, producer, pianist, cellist, composer, singer)
- Amaal Mallik (composer, singer)
- Mantovani
- Maria Matos Priolli (composer)
- Andrew Matthews-Owen (pianist, accompanist)
- Cecilia McDowall (composer)
- Salim Merchant (composer)
- Douglas Mews (composer)
- Mickey J. Meyer (composer)
- Tom Misch (producer, composer, singer, guitarist)
- Eric Parkin (pianist)
- Thomas King Ekundayo Phillips, organist, conductor, composer and teacher
- Margaret Price (soprano)
- Marcella Puppini (singer)
- Yo Yo Honey Singh (composer, music director, singer, rapper, record producer, arranger)
- Anirudh Ravichander (composer, music director, singer, songwriter, record producer, arranger, instrumentalist, conductor)
- Amy Shuard (soprano)
- Iyad Sughayer (pianist)
- Lana Trotovšek (violinist)
- Philip Turbett (bassoonist)
- Barry Wordsworth (conductor)

=== Dance ===
- Lea Anderson (choreographer, artistic director)
- Radhika Apte (actress)
- Cressida Bonas (actress)
- Sir Matthew Bourne (choreographer)
- Bilinda Butcher (vocalist/guitarist of My Bloody Valentine)
- Nighat Chaudhry (Kathak dancer)
- Anjali Jay (actress and dancer)
- Chisato Minamimura (Japanese dancer and choreographer)

== Notable staff ==
Current and former staff include:

- Richard Arnell – former Professor of Composition
- Peter Arnold – Professor of Piano
- Mulatu Astatke – conga drums
- Issie Barratt – composer
- Gabriele Baldocci – pianist
- Andrew Bernardi – violinist
- Oliver Butterworth – former Professor of Violin
- Nicholas Clapton – singer (former Professor of Singing)
- Natalie Clein – cellist
- Christine Croshaw – Professor of Piano, Chamber Music and Accompaniment
- Alison Crum – Professor of Viola da gamba, member of the Rose Consort of Viols
- Meredith Davies – Principal 1979–88
- Graham Anthony Devine – classical guitarist
- Terry Edwards – conductor
- Myers Foggin – Principal
- Philip Fowke – pianist
- Harry Gabb – organ professor
- Henry Geehl – conductor, composer, pianist
- Rivka Golani – viola
- Philip Jones – former Professor of Trumpet (founder of the Philip Jones Brass Ensemble)
- Mark Lockheart – jazz saxophonist
- Joanna MacGregor – pianist (honorary Professor)
- Andrew Matthews-Owen – pianist and coach
- Stephen Montague – composer
- Joan Rodgers – soprano
- Daryl Runswick – composer
- Yonty Solomon – pianist (Professor of Piano)
- Stephen Stirling – horn player
- Richard Tanner – organ
- John Tavener – composer (former Professor of Composition)
- David Thomas – singer (bass)
- Philip Turbett – bassoonist (modern and historical)
- John Webster – Professor of the Organ
- Jan Van Dyke – dancer
- Vasko Vassilev – violinist
- Marguerite Wolff – pianist
