= Colchester Institute =

College in Essex, UK

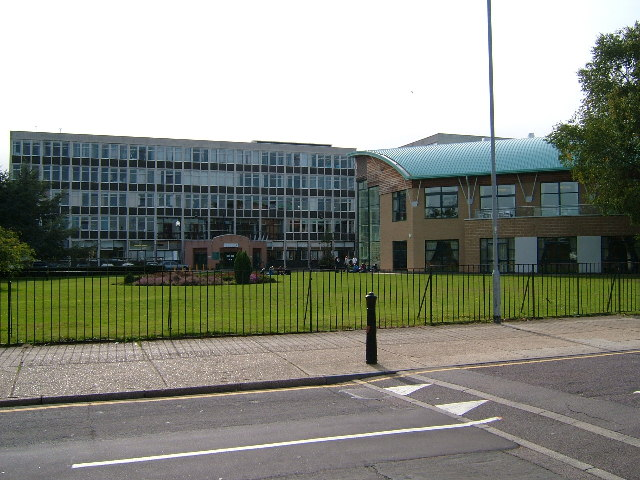
- Colchester Institute - view from Sheepen Road, Colchester in 2005
- Type: College
- Established: _
- Academic affiliations: University of Essex
- Principal: Alison Andreas
- Students: 10,000
- Undergraduates: Yes
- Postgraduates: Yes
- Location: Colchester, Essex, England; 51.893199°N 0.889571°E
- Website: colchester.ac.uk

Colchester Institute is a large provider of further and higher education based in the city of Colchester in Essex. Colchester Institute provides full-time and part-time courses for a wide variety of learners including 16- to 19-year-olds, apprentices, adults, businesses and employers. Undergraduate and Postgraduate Higher Education courses are delivered through University Centre Colchester and validated by the University of East Anglia, University of Huddersfield, and University of Essex.

== History ==
Colchester Institute has its roots in the North East Essex Technical College. It widened to include degree level programmes in Music (through accreditation by the University of London), Hospitality & Catering, and Art. In 1992 it joined with a number of colleges and "Anglia Higher Education College" to enable the latter to acquire university status as Anglia Polytechnic University (now Anglia Ruskin University). The other colleges in the Higher Education aspects of the "consortium" included City College Norwich, and the Norwich School of Art and Design. The "consortium" was dissolved in 2006 under a ratification programme proposed by the Higher Education Funding Council (England), and from that time Colchester Institute Higher Education awards were accredited by the University of Essex.

The colleges buildings were completely refurbished in 2000 with internal demolition, structural repairs and reconfiguration of the existing 1950s buildings, providing 4,000 m^{2} of new internal floor space for workshops, laboratories, classrooms and a library in which to study. In 2003, a new Construction Craft Centre opened, to provide specialist facilities for Plumbing and Electrical Installations.

On 1 January 2010, Colchester Institute took over Braintree College, rebranding this as The College At Braintree and subsequently Colchester Institute Braintree Campus.

The £10m STEM (Science, Technology, Engineering and Maths) Centre and South Wing building opened in 2016 at the Sheepen Road Campus. The advanced equipment and facilities incorporates a HAAS CNC machining centre, simulation rigs, commercial 3D printers, auto-CAD, and specialist science equipment.

Another facility at the Colchester site is the £5m Centre for Health and Social Care Professions, launched in 2020 with the addition of another storey to the South Wing building.

Facilities opened in 2022 include the Early Years Centre and commercial hair and beauty salons. Colchester Institute’s Balkerne Restaurant, the student run restaurant, was also refurbished in 2025.

In 2024, they launched a Net Zero and Renewables Centre, offering a range of Green Skills courses aimed at local industry, as well as their students.

The College was selected as 1 of 5 Clean Energy Technical Excellence College in the country. It will work alongside the Department for Education, Skills England and the Department for Energy Security and Net Zero, as well as other successful Technical Excellence Colleges (TECs) across the country, to support a coordinated national approach to clean energy skills.

== Campus information ==
Colchester, Sheepen Road Campus

The Colchester Campus is situated just outside Colchester's old Roman walls.

University Centre Colchester, Sheepen Road Campus

Located on Colchester Institute's Sheepen Road Campus.

Braintree Campus, Church Lane, Braintree

Colchester Institute's newest campus, following the merger with Braintree College.

The Energy Skills Centre, Harwich

The Centre first opened in 2013. It is supported by the Skills Funding Agency, Essex County Council and Tendring District Council.

Adult Skills Centres at Braintree, Clacton, Colchester and Dovercourt

In-person and online courses offered for Adults Learners in employability skills, construction and engineering.

== Departments ==
Colchester Institute has several faculties covering a variety of subject areas, including:

- Art, Design, Fashion and Photography
- Business and Accounting
- Catering and Hospitality
- Computing
- Construction and the Trades including Professional Construction, Brickwork, Painting and Decorating and Wood Occupations
- Digital Media
- Early Years
- Education Studies and Teacher Training
- Engineering and Manufacturing including Welding and Fabrication
- Healthcare including Counselling and Dental Nursing
- Motor Vehicle
- Music
- Performing Arts
- Plumbing and Electrical
- Salon studies including Hairdressing and Beauty Therapy
- Science
- Sport and Active Leisure
- Uniformed Services

Colchester Institute has around 10,000 young people and adults each year they provide professional development and technical skills training to.

== Alumni ==
- John Dagleish - actor
- Patricia Allison - actress
- Jordan Cardy - musician
- Roger Eno - musician
- Jon Hare - games designer & musician
- Adam Mansfield - cricketer
- Shea Lolin - musician
- Bob Russell - former MP for Colchester
- Sade - singer
- Sam Ryder - musician
- Jamie Rickers - TV presenter

== See also ==
- Braintree College
- Centre for Music and Performing Arts
