= Diplôme d'études supérieures spécialisées (Quebec) =

Specialized diploma in Quebec, Canada

The Diplôme d'études supérieures spécialisées (French pronunciation: [diplom detyd sypeʁjœʁ spesjalize], DESS) is a postgraduate diploma awarded by a Quebec university. It is called "Diploma (graduate level)", "Advanced Diploma" or "Post-Graduate Diploma" in English.

In Quebec, the diploma focuses on acquiring the foundations of a specialization in a particular field of study. It generally includes a practical dimension of the theoretical knowledge acquired, with the completion of an internship or a thesis. Admission to a DESS requires a prior university undergraduate degree such as a bachelor's degree. Sometimes, professional experience in the field is required. The DESS consists of 30 credits and is completed in a minimum of one year. The DESS may lead to admission to a master's program.

== See also ==
- Higher education in Canada
