= Peter Arnold (musician) =

British pianist

- Born: London, United Kingdom
- Genres: Classical
- Occupation: Musician
- Instrument: Piano

Peter Arnold is a British piano professor at the Trinity Laban Conservatoire of Music and Dance in London.

Arnold studied at Trinity College of Music with John Bingham. Arnold has played as a recitalist and as an accompanist. He has performed at the Purcell Room, St. Martin-in-the-Fields, Cheltenham Town Hall, and Egeskov Castle in Denmark. He has played in masterclasses with Vlado Perlemuter, Tamas Vasary, and Andre Tchaikovsky, and on Danish television playing Nielsen for the composer's protégé Hermann Koppell.
