= Centre for Music and Performing Arts =

Department of Colchester Institute, England

The Centre for Music and Performing Arts (or CMPA) is a specialised department of the Colchester Institute. The centre caters to all kinds of performing arts, including classical music, jazz and popular music studies, vocal instruction, acting and musical theatre. The department has been noted as being one of the finest in East Anglia and one of the best music departments in England. Graduates of the Music Diploma and Degree have gone on to schools such as the Royal Academy of Music, Royal College of Music, Royal Northern College of Music and the Guildhall School in London.

The centre offers a range of qualifications for people wishing to train in the Performing Arts including the specialised BTEC National Diplomas in Music Practice and Performance, for those wishing study intensively before going to specialist universities and colleges.

The Centre now offers courses in musical theatre for students wanting a more performance-based course. Currently, the National Diploma in Music Theatre and the Foundation Degree (or FdA) in Musical Theatre provide students with training in jazz, ballet, tap, singing, acting and musical theatre repertoire.
