= Conservatoires UK =

Representative body for higher education conservatoires in the United Kingdom

Conservatoires UK, also known as CUK, is a group that represents eleven world-leading British conservatoires. The current Chair of CUK is Professor Linda Merrick, Principal of the Royal Northern College of Music.

== Members ==
London Academy of Music and Dramatic Art	
Guildhall School of Music and Drama, London	
Leeds Conservatoire	
Royal Academy of Music, London	
Royal Birmingham Conservatoire	Royal Birmingham Conservatoire from Jennens Road
Royal Central School of Speech and Drama, London	
Royal College of Music, London	
Royal Conservatoire of Scotland, Glasgow	
Royal Northern College of Music, Manchester	
Royal Welsh College of Music & Drama, Cardiff	
Trinity Laban Conservatoire of Music and Dance, London	

== UCAS Conservatoires ==
In conjunction with UCAS, Conservatoires UK runs a clearing house for undergraduate and postgraduate music courses at seven of its member institutions called UCAS Conservatoires (formally CUKAS). Only the Guildhall School of Music and Drama does not accept applications through this system. UCAS Conservatoires allows applicants to submit one online application when applying to conservatoires, rather than a separate application for each institution (as was previously the case).

== CUK Board ==
The CUK Board is the decision-making body of CUK. Meeting regularly, the head of institution (usually titled 'principal') represents the constituent members and is led by a chair, deputy chair and lead.

== Student Network ==
The Conservatories UK Student Network is a sub-group of CUK and a representative body in itself of students studying at all member institutions. Formed in 2013, the group is made up of the elected students’ union presidents and student representatives of the member institutions, led by an elected chair. CUKSN works with the principal's group and external professional organisations to represent the views of students on their conservatoire education and experience.

== CUK Big Band ==
The CUK Big Band is an ensemble of young musicians from music colleges across the UK. The group has performed three times in Leeds College of Music's 'The Venue' as part of the Leeds International Jazz Conference and in 2008 performed at the annual International Association for Jazz Education Conference (IAJE) in Toronto. The band is Directed by Mark Donlon and has performed world premieres of works by leading jazz composers such as Issie Barratt, Matt Bourne, Kenny Wheeler, Mark Donlon, Julian Joseph, Bob Mintzer, Mike Gibbs and Tim Garland. Compositions are commissioned through the PRSF funded Creative Exchange project, which also funds an annual Creative Exchange Student Composer Award.
