= Golconda diamonds =

Antique Indian diamonds

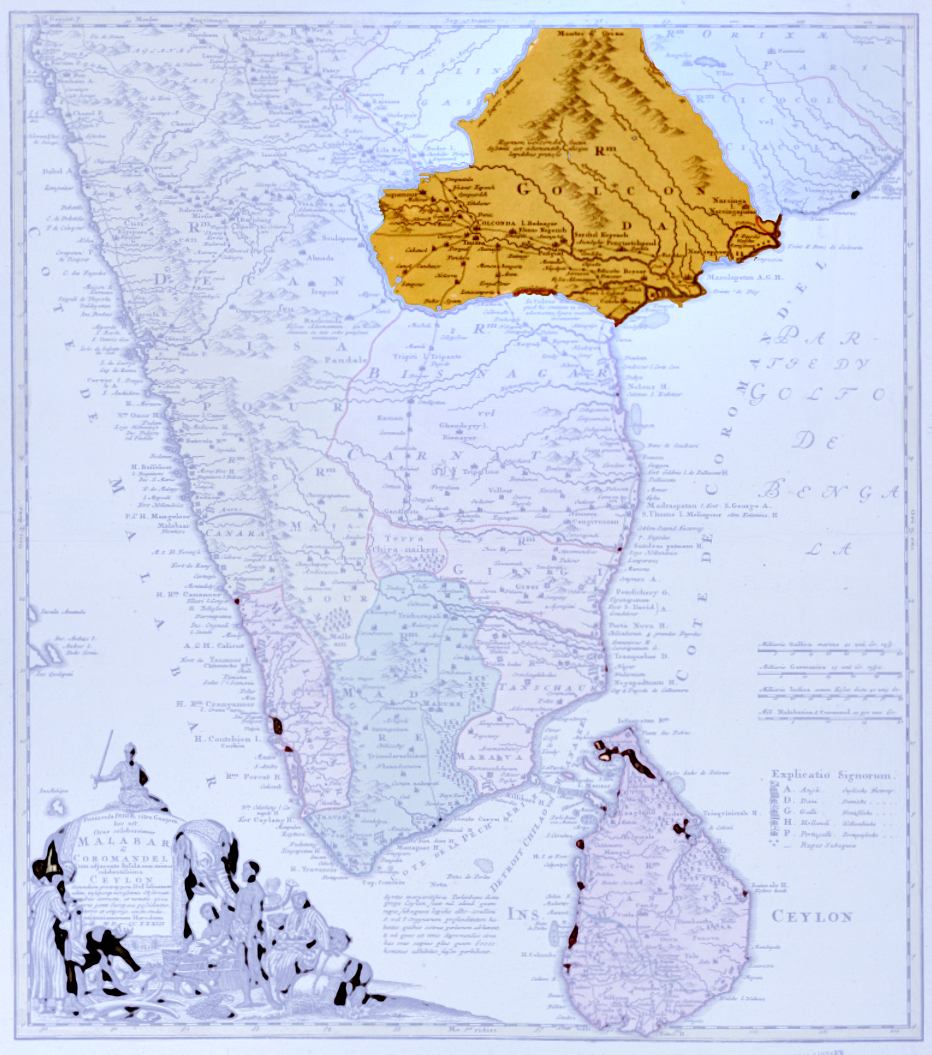
- A 1733 map of Golconda Sultanate—the term Golconda diamond became synonymous with diamonds of high quality.
- Color: Typically colorless; less often blue, translucent white, and pink.
- Cut: Antique cushion
- Country of origin: India
- Mine of origin: Kollur mine, Paritala and mines of Godavari delta

Golconda diamonds are mined in the Godavari-Krishna delta region of Andhra Pradesh, India. Golconda Fort in the western part of modern-day Hyderabad was a seat of the Golconda Sultanate and became an important centre for diamond enhancement, lapidary, and trading. Golconda diamonds are graded as Type IIa, are formed of pure carbon, are devoid of nitrogen, and are large with high clarity. They are often described as diamonds of the first water, making them among history's most-celebrated diamonds. The phrase "Golconda diamond" became synonymous with diamonds of incomparable quality.

For 2,000 years, Golconda diamonds were the only known fine diamonds. Due to centuries of excessive mining, their production was exhausted by 1830, and gemologists and traders have classified Golconda diamonds as antique, rare, and precious. Famous Golconda diamonds include the colourless Koh-i-Noor, the Nassak Diamond, the blue Hope Diamond, the Idol's Eye, the pink Daria-i-Noor, the white Regent Diamond, the Dresden Green Diamond, the colourless Orlov Diamond, and the yellow Florentine Diamond as well as now-untraceable diamonds such as the Akbar Shah, the Nizam Diamond, and the Great Mogul Diamond.

The Golconda diamond industry was at its peak from the 16th to 18th centuries when 23 mines, of which Kollur Mine was the most active, operated in the region with 30,000 people at a time working in one mine. (Note: The term Golconda mines originally denoted those (Kollur, Paritala, and other regional mines) that were mined during the Qutub Shahi period and continued until the time of the British Raj. The Deccan Sultanate of Qutub Shahis was known as Golconda Sultanate. Vajrakarur in present-day Anantapur district was a later-exploited mine and Amaragiri (present-day Kollapur, Mahbubnagar district) was not known until much later.) The output from all of the mines in Golconda is estimated to be around 10,000,000 carats (2.0 t). In 2015, Osmania University in collaboration with Geological Survey of India discovered potential new sites for diamond mining in the region, though as of 2022 mining had not started.

Several literary legends were inspired by Golconda diamonds; these include Sindbad the Sailor's valley of diamonds, the gem lore of Marco Polo, and the theme of Russell Conwell's inspirational lecture "Acres of Diamonds". According to folklore, some Golconda diamonds are cursed; these impart good luck to their owners or have mystical powers while others were worn as talismans. In 2013, the Princie Diamond from the Jewels of the Nizams was auctioned for US$39.3 million—the highest-recorded auction price for Golconda Diamonds and the world record for US$1.1 million per carat. In a heist in 2019, the Dresden White Diamond was stolen along with jewels worth US$1.2 billion.

== Geology ==
The Golconda diamondiferous region is located in the Southern Indian peninsular shield, which was formed during the process of proterozoic and Insular India. The region is spread over 50,000 km^{2} (19,000 sq mi), within the sediments of the Krishna-Pennar river basin and Deccan Traps, and contains 120 out of the 150 kimberlite pipes in India. Though kimberlite and lamproite are the primary rock source, conglomerate and placers had yielded the majority of the region's diamonds. The Geological Survey of India has categorized kimberlite pipes of southern India into clusters Southern Wajrakarur kimberlite, Northern Narayanpet kimberlite, and Central Raichur kimberlite of these, the Timmasamudram kimberlite cluster—a part of Southern Wajrakarur kimberlite—is significant.

== History ==
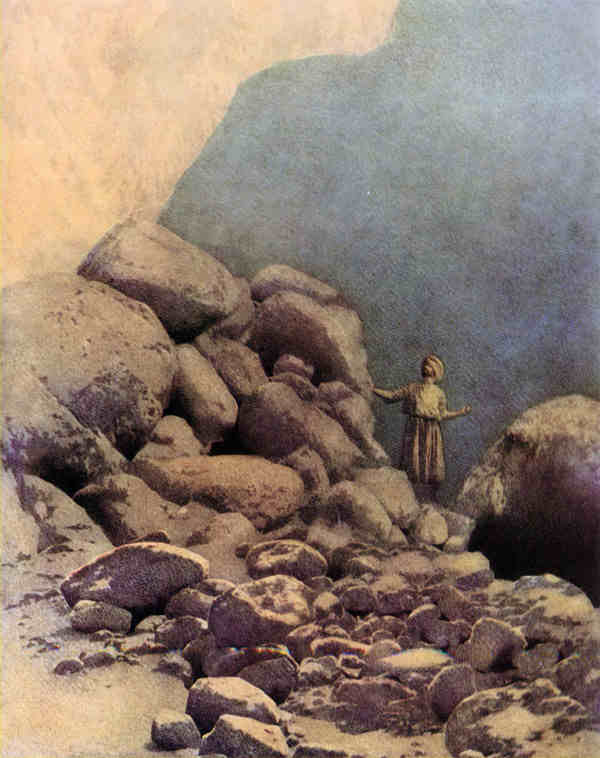
Sindbad the Sailor and the Valley of the Diamonds, illustrated by Maxfield Parrish (1870–1966)

Mediaeval records from Europe and the Middle East show India's importance as a source of high-quality diamonds. According to jewellery historian Jack Ogden, these records include those of Pliny the Elder, Marco Polo, Muhammed al-Idrisi, Ahmad al-Tifashi, and others from before the 12th century. The records state India produced diamonds with "which the gems were engraved". Ancient texts of Buddhists, Hindus, and Jains such as the Arthashastra (2nd century BCE – 4th century CE), the Ratna Pariksha, and the Puranas refer to cities and regions of India that produced diamonds. Roman historian Pliny the Elder (23–79 CE) in his encyclopedia described the demand and fondness of Roman imperial women for the diamonds of South India. The tales of Sinbad the Sailor's voyages, added to the folk tales collection One Thousand and One Nights (Arabian Nights, Alf Laila Wa Laila, or Alif Laila) in the 17th or 18th centuries, describe the Valley of the Diamonds. These regional descriptions have the same features of Deccan in general and the Golconda region in particular. These names are difficult to link to modern geographic names.

Until the 17th century, mines in this region was the largest source of diamonds on Earth. The Garudapuraṇa, Rasapaddhati, Agastyasaṃhitā and Bṛhatsaṃhitās all give lists of diamond mines across the Indian subcontinent. According to the records of 18th-and-19th-century geologists, researchers, and traders, the region south of the Kurnool district near the Krishna River valley in and around NTR district, Palnadu, and Guntur; the Godavari delta in Rampachodavaram and Bhadrachalam; north-eastern Madhya Pradesh; eastern Chhattisgarh; western Jharkhand; and north-western Odisha are possible historical sources of diamond. The best-known region among these was historically known as Telingana or Tilling, and was renamed Golconda during the Deccan sultanates period and generally known as the Godavari delta. As European travellers and traders increasingly engaged in trading with producers of this region, the region's diamonds came to be referred to as "Golconda diamonds".

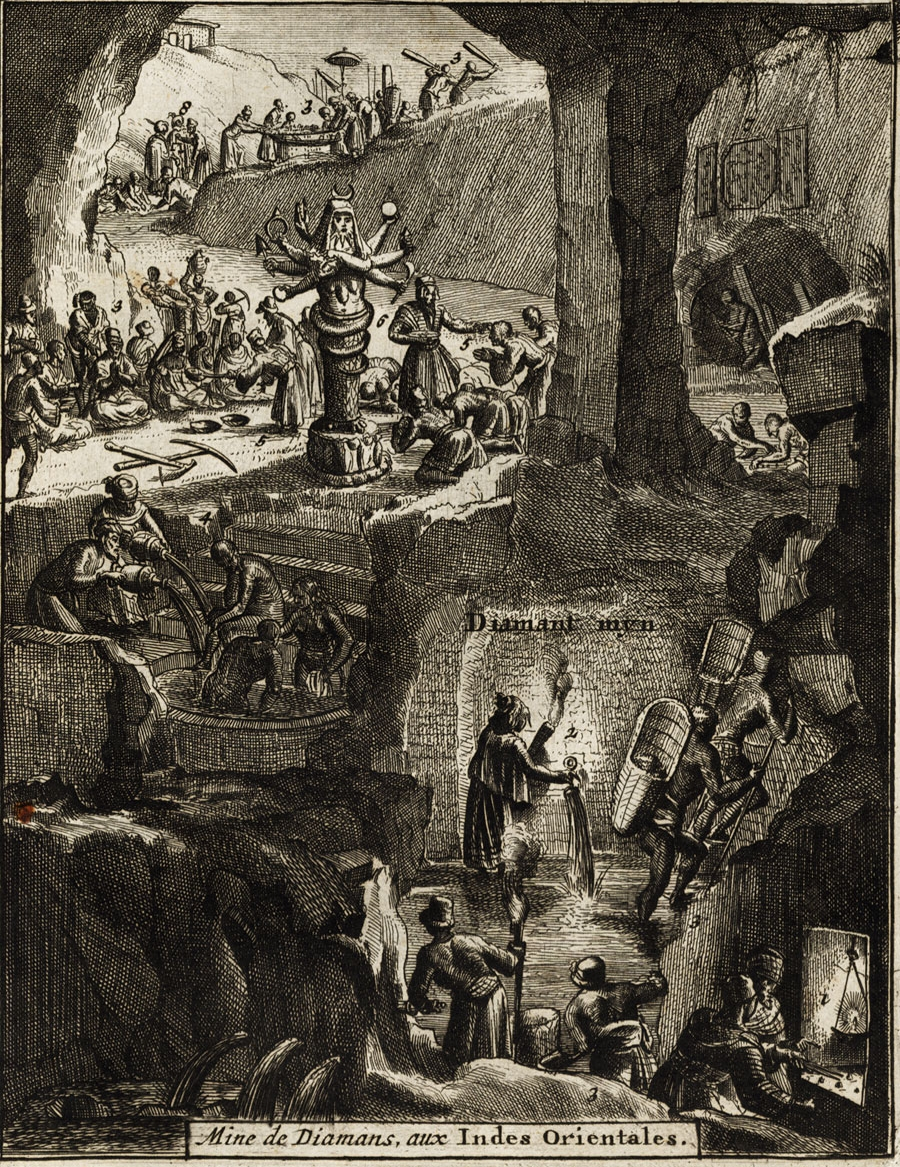
Diamond mine in the Golconda region 1725 CE from the collection of Pieter van der Aa—a Dutch publisher known for preparing maps and atlases.

=== Mining ===
The peak period of Golconda diamond mining was the 16th-to-18th centuries, when the region was controlled by the Golconda Sultanate and the Nizams of Hyderabad. The mines were leased under the supervision of regional governors, of whom prominent 17th-century diamond trader Mir Jumla became the Grand vizier (Prime Minister) of the Golconda Sultanate. He established a network of diamond merchants in Europe, Africa, the Middle East, and Asia—up to China and the Malay Archipelago. Shantidas Jhaveri was another 17th-century diamond trader.

Golconda diamonds were mined from alluvial soils alongside river beds. Mines were usually up to 4 fathoms (7.3 m; 24 ft) deep. When mining reached groundwater, digging was halted. Stony substances were then collected for assortment and examined for diamonds. Raw diamonds from the mines were typically transported to Golconda—now the western part of Hyderabad— for skilled lapidary, enhancement, further evaluation, and sale. The art of macle, which is a form of rough diamond that is used to produce jewellery, was first developed in the Golconda region. Of the 38 diamond mines in India at the time, 23 were located in the Golconda Sultanate, of which Kollur Mine was prominent and employed 60,000 workers at one time. Most of these mines were fully active until 1830 but were gradually abandoned as they became either submerged by the backwaters of the Pulichintala irrigation dam or became depleted. Diamond mining in the region gradually declined and finally officially closed.

In 2015, the Centre of Exploration Geophysics of Osmania University and the Geological Survey of India (GSI) conducted research that identified three zones that contain 21 potential new diamond-mining sites near the delta of the Krishna and Bhima rivers, and in the beds of the Krishna, Tungabhadra and Penna rivers. According to the research, the sites contain volcanic pipes that probably bear kimberlite and possibly diamonds. According to Outlook India, in 2022, some companies applied for mining rights in the region of Andhra Pradesh, soon after the National Geophysical Research Institute (NGRI) discovered diamond deposits in the seven districts of the state.

=== Trading ===
The Golconda region was a major trading centre and the source of the world's most-famous diamonds. Until the end of the 19th century, it was the primary source of the finest and largest diamonds in the world, making the name "Golconda diamond" synonymous with high-quality diamonds. It has been estimated the Golconda region traded around 10 million carats of diamonds. A unit of measurement for Golconda diamonds was the Ratti (7 /8 of a carat), and the most-common currency was the Golconda Pagoda, which was also called Hun.

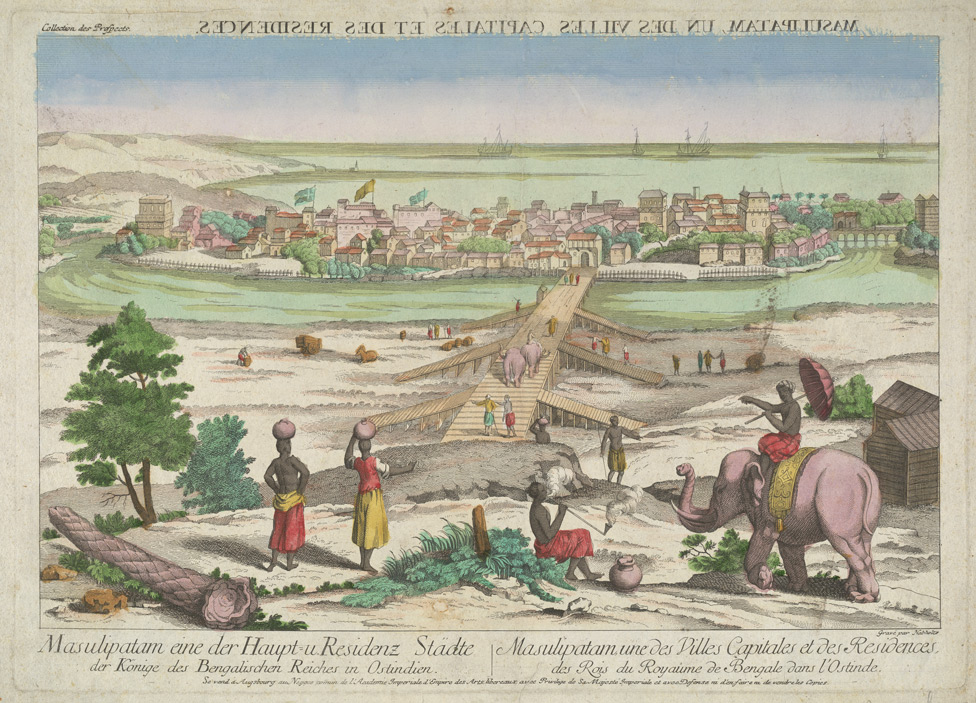
A scene of Machilipatnam port in 1676 AD, it was a prime seaport of Golconda Sultanate

Golconda had been trading diamonds with European kingdoms since at least the days of Marco Polo (1254–1324). During the 1420s, Niccolò de' Conti, a prominent Italian traveller and merchant who lived in India, had a detailed account of diamond valleys in the Golconda region. The 15th-century Portuguese discovery of the sea route to India and the 16th-century Golconda Sultanate's new port at Machilipatnam increased the production and trade of Golconda diamonds. The emergence of demand for Golconda diamonds led to the exploration and discoveries of mines in the region that produced brilliant diamonds.

In the 17th century, under the Golconda Sultanate, when new mines were discovered and leased to the miners, an agreement called "Qaul" would be signed under the supervision of regional governors, according to which, for employing 100 workers, miners would pay four pagodas per day, and monthly rent was based on the strength of the workers on the mining site. Provisions were supplied only by the governor with 50 percent extra excise duty. Large diamonds from the site were exclusively reserved for the rulers and to be sold with concessions. Bania and Khatri castes—merchant and trading communities in India—held most of mines. In the early 1600s, some Dutch miners of the Dutch East India Company were granted mining rights. The 17th-century French explorer Jean-Baptiste Tavernier reported he was "permitted to examine" the egg-shaped Great Moghul diamond, which is now lost and said to have been cut into smaller diamonds. He reported having seen a flat diamond called the Great Table diamond in Golconda. Jean de Thévenot, François Bernier or Antoine Destremau were French traders in Golconda diamonds.

In 1621 and 1622, when the Golconda rulers learned about the demand for Golconda diamonds in Europe, they seized all of the mines and temporarily halted mining to increase the price, which then doubled. In 1627, high prices led Dutch traders to stop purchasing, and the British East India Company brought investments and purchased the diamonds. The company's monopoly continued alongside indigenous traders such as Mir Jumla II, Virji Vora, and Kasi Veranna until the mines became depleted in the 1830s. Most of the impoverished governments and princely rulers were removed from power, forcing them sell their jewels—including Golconda diamonds—which were later auctioned. Due to their royal lineage, mystical tales, and advertising campaigns by companies, Golconda diamonds became the global status reference.

Paradesi Jews of Madras (now Chennai) traded in Golconda diamonds, precious stones, and corals. They had very good relations with the rulers of Golkonda because they maintained trade connections to some foreign countries (e.g. Ottoman Empire, Europe), and their language skills were useful. Although the Sephardim spoke Ladino (i.e. Judeo-Spanish), in India they learned Tamil and Konkani as well as Judeo-Malayalam from the Cochin Jews, also known as Malabar Jews.

Jacques de Paiva (Jaime Paiva) Paradesi Jews, established good relations with East India Company (EIC) and those in power, which enabled him to buy several mines to source Golconda diamonds. Through his efforts, Jews were permitted to live and trade Golconda diamonds and corals within Fort St. George. De Paiva died in 1687 after a visit to his mines of Golconda diamonds and was buried in the Jewish cemetery which he had established in Peddanaickenpet, which later became the north Mint Street, alongside the synagogue which also existed at Mint Street. On his tombstone we find that he died in the month of Tishri 5548 / 1687 CE.

== Popularity ==
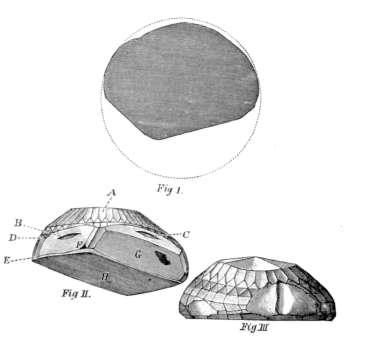
Diagram of the pre-1852 cut Koh-i-Noor. Fig I. The shaded area is the base. Fig II. A: flaw; B and C: notches cut to hold the stone in a setting; D: flaw created by fracture at E; F: fracture created by a blow; G: unpolished cleavage plane; H: basal cleavage plane. Fig III. The opposite side shows facets and peak of the "Mountain of Light"

Historically, diamonds of high quality were mined in the Golconda region, (Note: Historically colorless diamonds and general diamonds were mined from the Golconda region (within the alluvial deposits of the Krishna, Godavari and Penna rivers, because in those periods the term "Golconda diamonds" was not named, thus they were referred to as Indian Diamonds) and were reserved for emperors and rulers. Sometimes, diamonds were considered to have supernatural powers, and were worn as amulets and talismans. The Shah Jahan Diamond, which is currently part of Al Saba Collection, was once an amulet of Mughal emperors. Diamonds were treasured as gemstones, and were believed to be a gift from God to humanity, and owning them was a sign of supremacy. Golconda diamonds were popularized in the Middle East and the Western world by mediaeval and modern-period travellers and traders such as Niccolò de' Conti, Muhammad al-Idrisi, Marco Polo, and Jean-Baptiste Tavernier. Diamonds from India—most of which were Golconda diamonds—were used to decorate the crowns, coronets and sceptres of every nation; it was considered a point of pride by any ruler to own a Golconda diamond. The Industrial Revolution in the 19th century brought growth to the world economy, and the introduction of sophisticated cutting and polishing techniques led to a higher worldwide demand for diamonds. The popularity of Golconda diamonds has risen since the 1950s because of successful advertising campaigns by traders. They continue to be a popular gemstone in the 21st century.

=== Physical properties ===
Golconda diamonds are the world's most magnificent diamonds. They are formed of pure carbon and have no nitrogen, and are rated high on grading standards, giving them the rare Type IIa designation—(Type IIa count less than two percent of the world's natural diamonds.). They are large and naturally occur in many colours but most of them are known for their colourless clarity and material properties. Some are popular for their colours, for which they are characterized as Diamonds of First water.

=== Notable diamonds ===
Although Golconda diamonds are known for their size and clarity, the diamond mines of the Golconda region are now depleted and inactive. Later discoveries of diamond deposits in regions such as Brazil post-1730, Australia post-1851, and Africa post-1866 provided significant supplies of diamonds, although their clarity generally does not match that of Golconda diamonds. For these reasons, Golconda diamonds remain among the world's most-celebrated diamonds.

Some of the notable Golconda diamonds are:

- The Daria-i-Noor is part of the Iranian Crown Jewels collection of the Central Bank of Iran in Tehran
- The Nizam Diamond went missing from Hyderabad after a police action in 1948
- The Great Mogul Diamond and the Orlov Diamond are part of the Diamond Fund collection of Moscow's Kremlin Armoury
- The Koh-i-Noor is part of the Crown Jewels, which are housed in the Jewel House at the Tower of London
- The Hope Diamond is housed in the National Gem and Mineral Collection at the National Museum of Natural History in Washington, D.C.
- The Regent Diamond passed through French monarchs Charles X and Napoleon Bonaparte to the Government of France, and is now part of the French Crown Jewels on display in the Louvre, Paris
- The Idols Eye Diamond was stolen by a servant of Ottoman Sultan Abdul Hamid II while he was in exile in Paris, where it was sold to an unknown Spanish aristocrat
- The yellow Florentine Diamond was owned by Grand Duke Ferdinand I; it later became part of the Austrian Crown Jewels and is now in Canada.
- The Akbar Shah was engraved with the names of the Mughal emperors Akbar, Jahangir, and Shah Jahan, and was later mounted on the Peacock Throne. After Persian ruler Nader Shah lost it, the diamond appeared for sale in Turkey; it was purchased by a British company that later reshaped it and sold it to the Indian Prince of Baroda Malhar Rao Gaekwad. The current possessor of the diamond is unknown.

The world's top-four pink diamonds are from Golconda. Cardinal Mazarin was an influential Chief minister of France during the reign of Louis XIII and Louis XIV; Mazarin, a connoisseur of jewels, sponsored Jean Baptiste Tavernier's journey to India to collect diamonds; among his collection is the 19.07-carat, light-pink Le Grand Mazarin Diamond, which he always kept close to him. In his will, Mazarin bequeathed the diamond to decorate the French crown; all of the French rulers from Louis XIV to Napoleon III have worn it. After France's defeat in the Franco-Prussian War (1870), the diamond, along with other French Crown Jewels, was sold to settle the losses. Frederic Boucheron, a jewellery-house owner, purchased it.

=== Popular culture ===
- While travelling in the Middle East in 1869, Russell Conwell, a lawyer and educator who founded Temple University in Philadelphia, US, met an Arab bedouin who told him a story in which "beneath Ali Hafed's farm sat the great mines and diamonds of Golconda". Intrigued by the tale, Conwell prepared his inspirational lecture "Acres of Diamonds".
- In 1953, Golconda diamonds became popularized when actor Marilyn Monroe posed wearing Moon of Baroda to promote her movie Gentlemen Prefer Blondes, in which she performs the song "Diamonds Are a Girl's Best Friend". The song became a household phrase, and popularized the diamond—particularly on an engagement ring—as a symbol of romance and love.
- In 1959, the Krupp Diamond ring was stolen from German actor Vera Krupp (1909–1967) in a robbery at her house. The diamond was recovered after the Federal Bureau of Investigation (FBI) became involved. In 1968, it came into the possession of Elizabeth Taylor, who renamed it the "Elizabeth Taylor Diamond". Taylor was fond of jewellery and owned a collection of gems and jewellery; she also published a book about her collection called My Love Affair with Jewelry (2002).
- The Heart of the Ocean, a blue diamond necklace in the film Titanic (1997), was designed by London-based jewellers Asprey & Garrard, who took inspiration from three diamonds of the French Crown Jewels known as The Regent, the Marie Antoinette Blue, and the Hope Diamond.
- The pink, cushion-cut, 34.65-carat Princie Diamond used to be part of the Jewels of the Nizams of Hyderabad; it was auctioned in 2013 by Christie's and sold for US$39.3 million, which is the highest-recorded auction price for a Golconda diamond and a world record for US$1.1 million per carat.
- On 28 July 2014, the American television channel Animal Planet presented an episode called "The Golconda Curse" in the series Lost treasure hunters Season I.
- The Cartier Toussaint Necklace in the 2018 film Ocean's 8 was inspired by the necklace of Ranjitsinhji, ruler of Nawanagar State in India. The main attraction of the necklace is its centrepiece 136.25-carat (27.250 g) Queen of Holland Diamond, whose place of origin is unknown but based on its characteristics, gemologists placed it among the Golconda diamonds.

== Legends and folklore ==
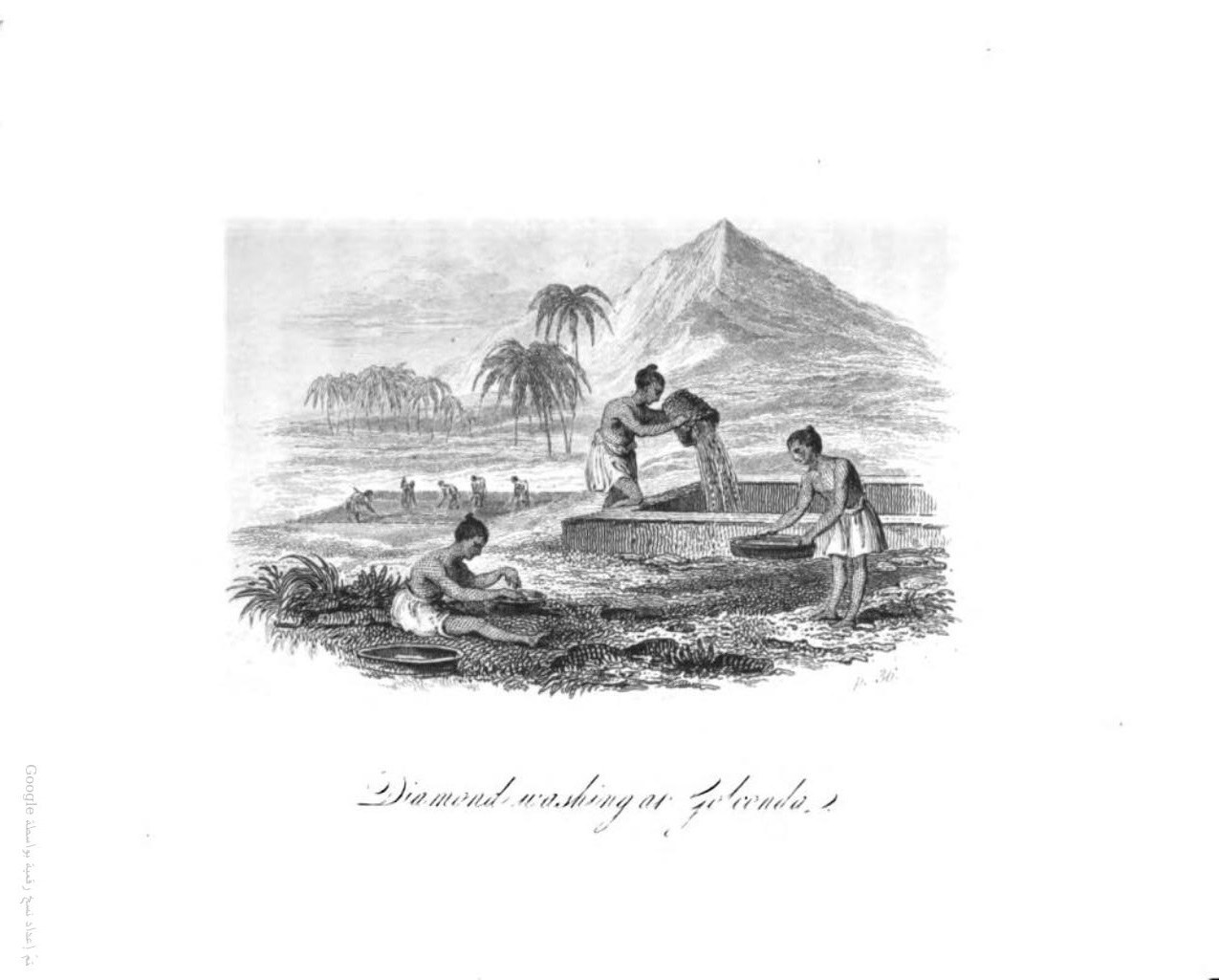
Women in the process of washing earthy substances from soil, at a site of an unnamed Golconda mine.

According to a popular legend, the Koh-i-Noor should only be possessed by a female and will bring bad luck to a male. Alauddin Khalji, who obtained it from the Kakatiya dynasty, was murdered by his slave. Nader Shah, who looted the Koh-i-Noor from the Mughals and gave it its current name, was assassinated. Shuja Shah Durrani was overthrown by his predecessor and went into exile. Ranjit Singh died of a heart attack and when the diamond passed to the East India Company, it was passed on to Queen Victoria, after which it was successively mounted in the crowns of Queen Alexandra, Queen Mary, and Queen Elizabeth the Queen Mother. The latter crown, along with the other Crown Jewels, is on public display in the Jewel House at the Tower of London.

Accounts of ill fortune and curses are also associated with the Hope Diamond; Tavernier, who took the stone to Paris, was "torn to pieces by wild dogs" in Constantinople. Louis XIV gave it to Madame de Montespan, whom later he abandoned. Sultan Hamid of Turkey gave it to Abu Sabir to "polish" but Sabir was later imprisoned and tortured. An article entitled "Hope Diamond Has Brought Trouble To All Who Have Owned It" appeared in The Washington Post in 1908.

According to legend, the Regent Diamond was discovered between 1698 and 1701 at Kollur Mine. A slave worker who found the diamond smuggled it out by hiding it deep inside a self-inflicted cut. The slave wanted to escape from India with the diamond so he contacted the captain of a British ship. The slave and the captain agreed to share equally in the proceeds from the diamond's sale in exchange for safe passage. Later, the captain stole the diamond, killed the slave, and sold the diamond to an Indian merchant named Jamchand. Jamchand supposedly sold it to Thomas Pitt, who in turn sold it to Philippe d'Orléans.

According to pervasive folklore narrated by Marco Polo about his 13th-century visits to the Golconda region, the diamond valley was replete with venomous snakes, making obtaining the diamonds dangerous. The diamond traders took a herd of cattle to the hilltop near the valley. After slaughtering the cattle, they catapulted cow flesh towards the diamond valley; the flesh became stuck to the diamonds, which were picked up by eagles and vultures that carried the cow flesh to their nests to eat. The stones remained after the birds consumed the flesh, allowing the stones to be tracked and collected by the local merchants' workers. According to Jean R. Brink, who wrote Renaissance Culture in Context: Theory and Practice (2017), this legend is repeated in many mediaeval Arabic and Chinese literary works. It was also repeated by Marco Polo, who visited the region's capital Warangal but did not visit the mining sites.

== Controversies, scandals, and heists ==
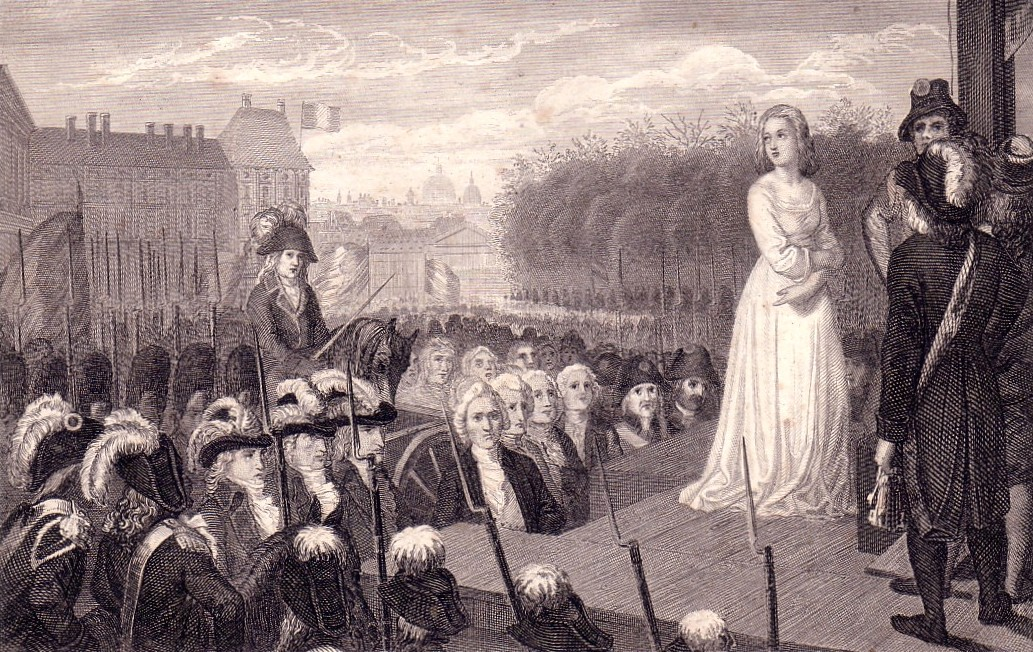
Queen Marie Antoinette of France being taken for execution, a steel engraving-1850

Being the world's most-famous, large, and valuable stones with interesting histories, Golconda diamonds attract envy and fascination, for which many controversies, robberies, and scandals have occurred. The Affair of the Diamond Necklace (1784–1786) was about a 2,800-carat necklace containing 647 gems. The incident brought ignominy to Queen Marie Antoinette and later instigated the French Revolution. In 1792, the French Crown Jewels were stolen from the Garde Meuble (Royal Treasury); although most of the jewels were traced, the thieves sold the Sancy and Regent Diamonds, and the Royal French Blue Diamond was cut and renamed the Hope Diamond. The thief returned the Mazarin Diamond in exchange for a pardon and the diamond was restored to the French crown. In 1811, Napoleon Bonaparte gifted his wife Marie Louise the Napoleon Diamond Necklace, which became a sensation during the Great Depression (1929) when Archduke Leopold of Austria was imprisoned on larceny charges connected with the necklace sale.

In 1980, a heist was executed at Sydney Town Hall, New South Wales, Australia, to steal the 95-carat yellow Golconda d'or diamond from an exhibition display. In 2019, the Al Thani Collection of Qatar faced a trial after purchasing the Princie Diamond in an auction without its heir's consent. The matter was settled out of court. In the same year, jewels worth US$1.2 billion were stolen in a heist from the Green Vault in Dresden Castle, Germany; along with other treasures, the 49-carat rose cut Dresden White Diamond, which was made into an epaulette during the Seven Years' War of 1756 AD, was stolen. The diamond belonged to 18th-century ruler Frederick Augustus I of Saxony.

== See also ==
- List of diamonds
- List of largest rough diamonds

== Explanatory notes ==
C. Golconda diamonds that are Type IIb variety, deliver rare and exotic blue diamonds. The color is derived by the existence of boron in the diamond. So while white (colorless) diamonds are of Type IIa the presence of Type IIb diamonds is also significant - surely not by volume as blue Golconda diamonds are extremely rare.
