= Diamond mining in India =

Diamond Mining in India

Diamond mining in India extends back into antiquity. From ancient times, India was the source of nearly all the world's known diamonds, and until diamonds were discovered in Brazil in 1726, India was the only place where diamonds were mined. India has not been a major diamond-producing country since the 1900s, but diamond mining continues. In 2013, India mined 37,515 carats of diamonds, from one industrial-scale mine and many artisanal mines; this was less than one-tenth of one percent of the world production of 132.9 million carats.

== History ==
=== Ancient times ===
Diamond mining as an industry appears to have originated between 700 and 500 BCE in India. The double diamond drill technique was present in western India prior to 600 BCE (7th century BCE).

Accounts of early Indian diamond mining that reached Europe were often mixed with myths. Around 400 BCE, the Greek physician Ctesias published Indika, a compilation of travellers' tales about India (he himself had never been to India). He described incredibly rich diamond deposits guarded by griffins. Pliny the Elder, in his Natural History (79 CE), correctly described diamonds being washed from river gravel in India. The Arthashastra of Kautilya mentions diamond trade in India. Buddhist works dating from the 4th century BCE describe the diamond as a well-known and precious stone but do not mention the details of diamond cutting.

=== Medieval period (1200 to 1800 CE) ===
Diamonds were reported from numerous places across India, but most of the diamond mining took place by placer mining in the drainages of the Penna River and Krishna River in modern Andhra Pradesh state. Placer mining took place along the Krishna River for 300 km below Sangram. The most intensive mining was in a 60 km zone along the river, from the Kollur Mine to Paritala. This area was the source of many legendary gems, including the Koh-i-Noor, Nizam Diamond, Hope Diamond, Regent Diamond, Great Mogul Diamond, and the Orlov Diamond.

India's unique status as a producer of diamonds continued to fascinate Europeans. Marco Polo travelled along the coast of India in 1292, and recorded tales he heard about diamonds being found in deep mountain valleys made nearly inaccessible by heat, lack of water, and venomous snakes. The French traveller Jean Baptiste Tavernier visited the Krishna River diggings in 1665, and estimated that about 60,000 people were mining diamonds.

The town of Karwan, near the fortress city of Golkonda, now a suburb of Hyderabad, became the world's largest diamond-cutting and diamond-trading centre. Golconda was not close to diamond mines, but owed its status as a diamond centre to its location on a major trade route from the mines to the south and east. The diamonds became known as Golconda Diamonds, and in Europe, the word Golconda came to mean a place of great wealth.

India continued to be the world's leading source - and nearly the only source - of diamonds until diamonds were discovered in Brazil in 1726. At first, Brazilian diamonds were reputed to be inferior, and did not command as high a price as the Indian article. To obtain better prices, Portuguese traders began shipping Brazilian diamonds through Goa, and then to Europe to be sold as genuine Golconda diamonds. Indian diamond mining declined rapidly in the 1700s, due to a combination of exhaustion of known deposits and competition from Brazil.

Diamond mining in the Panna region began around 1675 CE, during the rule of Chhatrasal, the Bundela ruler. Diamond mining continues in the region.

== Recent mining in Panna region (Bundelkhand) ==
As of 2017, there was one industrial-scale diamond mine in India, the Majhgawan mine, near the town of Panna, Madhya Pradesh. The deposit is in a kimberlite or lamproite pipe 6.5 ha in area, and yields 10 carats to the ton. Mining is done by an open pit, which was 85 m deep as of 2011. Exploration drilling has established that the pipe continues down to at least 330 m. The mine is owned by the National Mineral Development Corporation (NMDC), employs 199 people, and has a productive capacity of 84,000 carats per year. The mine began regular production in 1967, and to date, has yielded slightly more than a million carats of diamonds.

There are also numerous artisanal-scale mines. In the Panna mining district, the Government of Madhya Pradesh leases 8×8 m plots to individuals, who wash the gravel for diamonds. All diamonds found are required to be handed over to the government diamond office in Panna, which markets the gems, and gives the sales proceeds to the finders, less taxes and 11.5% royalty. In 2016, there were officially 952 artisanal mines, which yielded 835 carats of diamonds. However, there is an unknown number of small illegal mines, and an unknown amount of diamonds sold on the black market.

The Rio Tinto Group discovered the Bunder diamond deposit in 2004 in Chhatarpur district near Buxwaha. The deposit is in an ecologically sensitive area. In February 2017, Rio Tinto quit work on the project, and gave the deposit and all on-site equipment to the state government of Madhya Pradesh.

== See also ==
- Mining in India
