= Idol's Eye =

70.21-carat blue diamond

- Weight: 70.21 carats (14.042 g)
- Color: Very light blue
- Cut: Tabular, free-form. Inscribed.
- Country of origin: India
- Mine of origin: Kollur Mine
- Discovered: 1600
- Original owner: privately owned

The Idol's Eye (also Idols Eye) is a 70.21-carat Golconda diamond. It has a very light blue colour with nine main facets and was found in 1600 in the Golconda Sultanate in southern India. According to legend, the diamond was initially owned by Prince Rahab of Persia, who gave it to his creditors to settle his debts. The diamond re-appeared on 14 July 1865, when it was introduced by Christie's for auction in London, where it was purchased by Ottoman sultan Abdul Hamid II. After the Young Turk Revolution the jewel turned up in Paris on 24 July 1909, after which it was purchased by a Spanish aristocrat. Following World War II, it was sold to the American jeweller Harry Winston, and later purchased by the American philanthropist May Bonfils Stanton. After her death in 1962, it was purchased by the Chicago jewelry store owner Harry Levinson at auction.

It was owned by Saud bin Muhammed Al Thani at the time of his death in 2014.
