= Casa Verona's Mosque =

Mosque in Chennai, Tamil Nadu, India

Religion
- Affiliation: Islam
- Ecclesiastical or organizational status: Mosque
- Status: Active

Location
- Location: Chennai, Tamil Nadu
- Country: India

Architecture
- Type: Mosque architecture
- Founder: Casa Verona
- Completed: 1680 CE

Casa Verona's Mosque is a mosque in the George Town (Note: George Town is also known as Muthialpet.) neighbourhood of Chennai, in the state of Tamil Nadu, India. It is one of the oldest mosques in the city and was constructed by Casa Verona, a dubash of the British East India Company.

== History ==
Casa Verona, or Kasi Viranna, was a Hindu merchant from Madras who traded with the Sultanate of Golconda. He was so close to the Sultans of Golconda that they even gave him a Muslim name, Hasan Khan. The mosque was built in the land which belonged to him a little before his death in 1680 CE.

== See also ==
- Islam in India
- List of mosques in India
