= Golconda diamonds mining and trading =

Commerce involving Indian diamonds

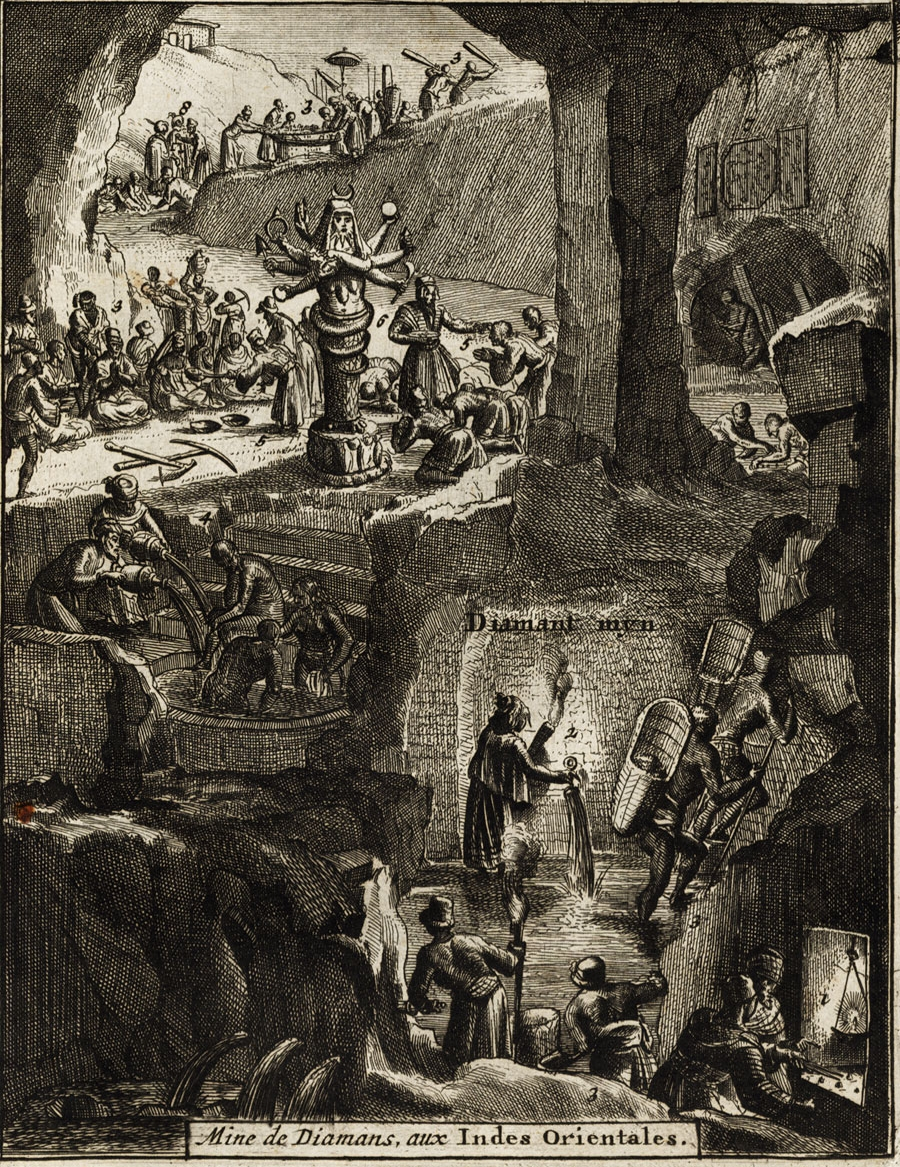
Diamond mine in the Golconda region 1725 CE from the collection of Pieter van der Aa—a Dutch publisher known for preparing maps and atlases.

The period of peak production of the Golconda diamonds (in the present-day states Andhra Pradesh and Telangana, India) was under the Qutb Shahi dynasty (16th century – 17th century CE), and the region was also known as the "Golconda Sultanate". The Asaf Jahi dynasty (18th century – 19th century CE) was later dominant, and it was also known as the "Nizam of Hyderabad". During these times, the diamond mines were leased out to merchants under the supervision of regional governors. The periods of the leases were recorded in days. Local merchants Shantidas Jhaveri and Khushalchand were legendary diamond traders of the region. Large diamonds (over 1 carat) obtained from the mines were reserved for the rulers under terms of the leases.

Actual mining of the Golconda diamonds occurred in alluvial soil settings, alongside river beds, and diamonds were found within a few feet of the surface of the land. After the customary survey of geological formations between the river and the mountains, mining sites were selected and a clay cistern would be prepared on the spot for use in digging. The depth of the mines was usually up to four fathoms (7.3 meters). In some situations, if boulders appeared during digging, the boulders were covered with coal and burned out to make them very hot. Then water was sprayed on the boulders to produce cracks through thermal shock. The remnants of the boulders were then carved out with tools. This removal procedure was used since gunpowder was not yet a tool for mining in the region at the time. When mining reached ground water, digging was halted. At that point in the mining process, the miners washed away the earthy particles from the collected soil. Stony substances were then collected for assortment and examination to obtain diamonds. The earthy coverings of limescale ore were then removed, to yield the raw diamonds. The raw diamonds from the regional mines were typically then transported to the Golconda (now the western part of Hyderabad) for skilled lapidary, enhancement and further evaluation and sale.

The art of macle, which is a form of rough diamond used to produce jewelry, was first developed in the Golconda region. Of the 38 diamond mines in India at the time, 23 were located in the Golconda Sultanate, of which the Kollur Mine was prominent where 60,000 workers were employed at once, making Golconda the "Diamond Capital" of the past.

Most of these mines were fully active until 1830 CE but were gradually abandoned as they became either submerged by the backwaters or depleted due to excessive mining. Thus, mining gradually declined and finally officially closed.

In the year 2015, research was conducted by the Centre of Exploration Geophysics (Osmania University) and by the Geological Survey of India. The research identified three zones that contain 21 new potential diamond mining sites near the delta of the Krishna and Bhima rivers, specifically in the riverbeds of the Krishna, Tungabhadra and Penna. According to the research, the sites contain volcanic pipes which probably bear Kimberlite and possibly diamonds.

== Mining and trading ==
Mir Jumla II also known as Mir Jumla and Mohammad Saad, came to Golconda Sultanete from Persia and initially, he traded into daily wares later when he realize the worth of Golconda Diamonds, he expanded trading and become the most prominent merchant of Golconda diamonds, he established a network of traders from Persia, Arab, Dutch, French, Portuguese, Burma, China, Malay Archipelago and Bengal. Jean-Baptiste Tavernier advised Mir Jumla that there is little market of diamonds in europe at that time, thus prompting Mir Jumla to send his diamond miners back for agricultural works.

In the 1600s AD when mines were leased, an agreement—(called Qaul) would be signed under the supervision of regional governors—miners were charged four Pagodas per day for 100 workers, while they will pay monthly rent based on the strength of the workers, provisions, and tobacco were provided with 50 percent extra excise duty while large and exclusive carat of diamonds would only be sold to the ruler with concessions, while Bania community—(a merchant and trading community in India) used to have the majority of holdings and during the early 1600 AD some Dutch miners of Dutch East India Company were granted mining rights. In 1621–22 AD when Golconda rulers learned about the demand and selling price for Golconda diamonds in Europe, the rulers seized all the mines and temporarily halt the mining process to increase the demand, due to which the price rises up to double. In 1627, seeing the high prices the Dutch traders stop purchasing, and utilizing this opportunity the British (East India Company) brought investment and purchased the diamonds.
