= Akbar Shah (diamond) =

Diamond in the Mughal dynasty of India

The Akbar Shāh, also known as the "Lustre of the Peacock Throne", is a diamond dating back to the Mughal dynasty of India. It is an irregular, pear-shaped diamond with a light green hue, weighing 73.60 carat.

The names of three Mughal emperors Akbar, Jahangir and Shah Jahan were elegantly listed on its sides, which makes it prominent.

== History ==
The Akbar Shāh diamond was found in the famed Golconda mines, and is thus part of the group of stones collectively known as the Golconda diamonds. The Akbar Shah was once the property of the Mughal emperor Akbar, hence its name. It was engraved on two faces with inscriptions in Arabic, by order of his grandson Shāh Jahān. The English translation of them is Shāh Akbar, the Shāh of the World, 1028 and To the Lord of two worlds, 1039. The dates are given according to the Hijrī years, and correspond to 1618 and 1629 of the Christian era.

It is believed by some historians that this celebrated gem was set as one of the eyes of the peacock in the fabulous Peacock Throne. However, other scholars suggest the possibility of it being the dazzling diamonds encircled by emeralds and rubies, suspended opposite the throne.

In any case, the diamond disappeared. If it had been set in the Peacock Throne it would have disappeared when the Afsharid Persian Emperor Nādir Shāh seized the throne along with other plundered treasures in 1739. The throne was lost on its way to Iran in a battle with Kurds, who broke it up for the value of the metal and stones.

The stone eventually reappeared in Turkey, where it had been given the new name 'Shepherd's Stone'. It was then purchased in 1866 in Istanbul by London merchant George Blogg, who commissioned Levi Moses Auerhaan to re-cut it into drop-form. Unfortunately the historic inscriptions were destroyed in the process. The stone, which had originally weighed 120 Arabic carats (about 119 metric carats 23 g), had been reduced to 73.60 metric carats (14.34 g). In the following year, the diamond was purchased by Malhar Rao Gaekwad of Baroda, India, for what was said to have been 350,000 rupees (about £26,000).

In 1926, the new ruler of Baroda, Sayājī Rāo Gaekwāḑ III, had Jacques Cartier reset the stone in platinum, along with the rest of his jewelry collection; the new metal was becoming more fashionable than gold. The diamond, along with other world-famous diamonds like the Star of the South and the Empress Eugénie, was in the list of properties disclosed in wealth tax returns of the late Fātehsinh Rāo Gaekwāḑ, dated 31 March 1988. Later his wife, Shanta Devi, also mentioned the diamond in her wealth tax returns. It is uncertain whether the stone is still in the family's possession or has been sold, similar to the Star of the South.

== See also ==
- List of diamonds
