= Koh-i-Noor =

Large cut diamond

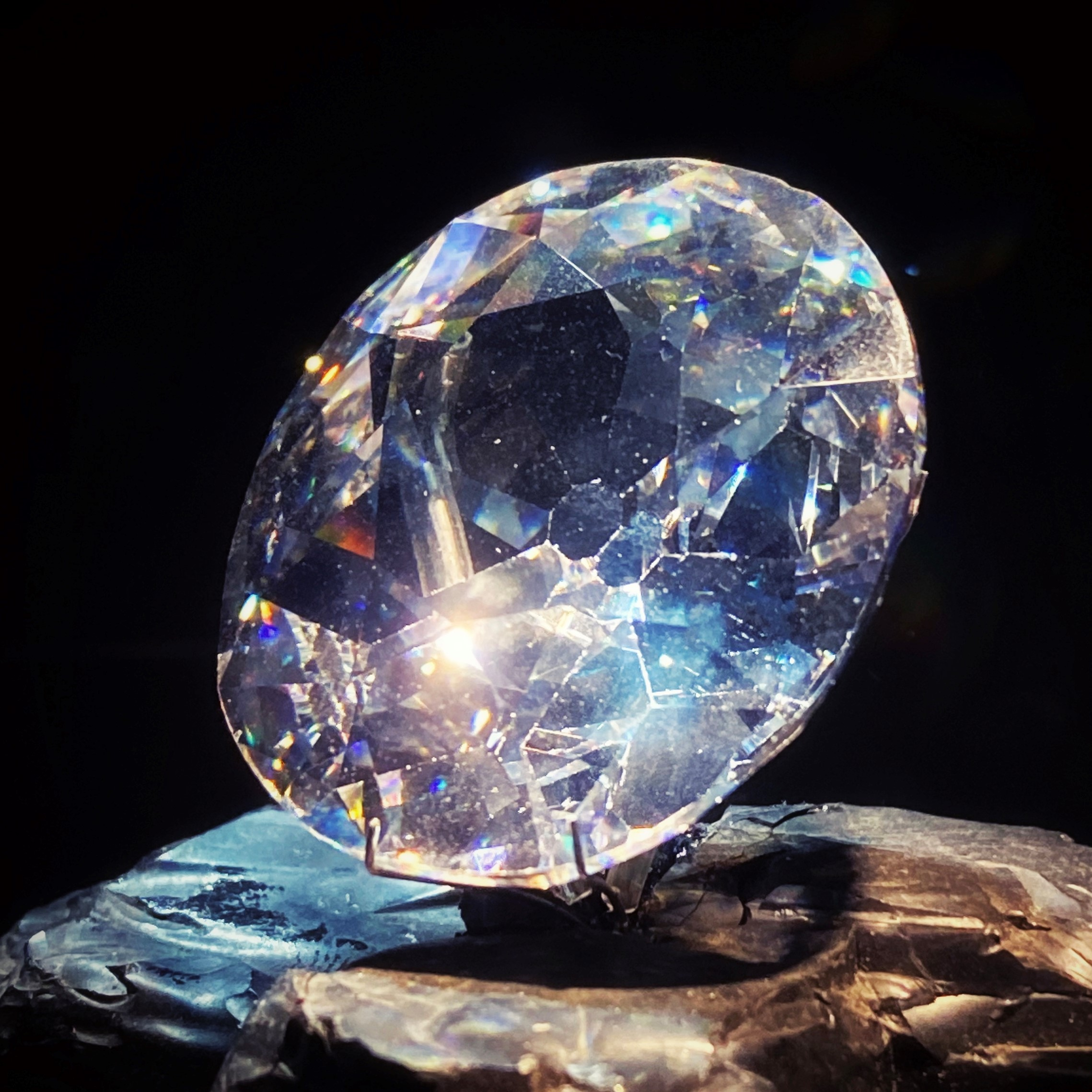
- Replica of the Koh-i-Noor
- Weight: 105.602 (Note: Weights from 82 3/4 to 122 3/4 carats have been erroneously published since the 19th century. Until 1992, the official weight of the Koh-i-Noor was 108.93 metric carats, but this figure has been revised to 105.602 metric carats, or 102 13/16 old English carats.) carats (21.1204 g)
- Dimensions: 3.6 cm (1.4 in) long; 3.2 cm (1.3 in) wide; 1.3 cm (0.5 in) deep
- Colour: D (colourless)
- Type: IIa
- Cut: Oval brilliant
- Facets: 66
- Mine of origin: possibly Kollur Mine now in Andhra Pradesh, India
- Owner: Charles III in right of The Crown

The Koh-i-Noor (/ˌkoʊɪˈnʊər/ KOH-in-OOR) (Note: Also spelled Koh-e-Noor, Kohinoor and Koh-i-Nur. Persian (کوه نور) and Hindi for "Mountain of Light".) is one of the largest cut diamonds in the world, weighing 105.6 carats (21.12 g). It is currently set in the Crown of Queen Elizabeth the Queen Mother.

There are multiple conflicting legends on the origin of the diamond, but many Victorian commentators identified it with a diamond said to have originated in the Kollur Mine in India. According to the colonial administrator Theo Metcalfe, there is "very meagre and imperfect" evidence of the early history of the Koh-i-Noor before the 1740s. There is no record of its original weight, but the earliest attested weight is 186 old carats (191 metric carats or 38.2 g). The first verifiable record of the diamond comes from a history by Muhammad Kazim Marvi of the 1740s invasion of northern India by Afsharid Iran under Nader Shah. Marvi notes the Koh-i-Noor as one of many stones on the Mughal Peacock Throne that Nader looted from Delhi.

The diamond then changed hands between various rulers of south and west Asia, until being surrendered to Queen Victoria in 1849 by the then-11-year-old maharaja of the Sikh Empire, Duleep Singh, following the Second Anglo-Sikh War and the annexation of Punjab by the British East India Company. The young king ruled under the shadow of the Company ally Gulab Singh, the first Maharaja of Jammu and Kashmir, who had previously possessed the stone.

In 1851, it went on display at the Great Exhibition in London, but the lackluster cut failed to impress viewers. Prince Albert, husband of Queen Victoria, ordered it to be re-cut as an oval brilliant by Coster Diamonds. By modern standards, the culet (point at the bottom of a gemstone) is unusually broad, giving the impression of a black hole when the stone is viewed head-on; it is nevertheless regarded by gemologists as "full of life".

Since arriving in the UK, it has only been worn by female members of the British royal family. It is said to bring bad luck if it is worn by a man. Victoria wore the stone in a brooch and a circlet. After she died in 1901, it was set in the Crown of Queen Alexandra. It was transferred to the Crown of Queen Mary in 1911, and to the Crown of Queen Elizabeth the Queen Mother in 1937 for her coronation.

Today, the diamond is on public display in the Jewel House at the Tower of London. The governments of India, Iran, Pakistan and Afghanistan have all claimed ownership of the Koh-i-Noor, demanding its return ever since India gained independence from the British Empire in 1947. The British government insists the gem was obtained legally under the terms of the Last Treaty of Lahore in 1849 and has rejected the claims.

== History ==
=== Possible origins ===
In 1310, the Delhi Sultan Alauddin Khalji acquired a large diamond after subjugating the Kakatiya dynasty of southern India. His court poet Amir Khusrau quotes a Kakatiya messenger as saying that this diamond was "unrivaled in the world", and that wise men refused to believe its existence. The 18th century chronicler Khafi Khan identifies this precious stone as the Koh-i-Noor.

After Babur—the founder of the Mughal Empire—defeated Ibrahim Khan Lodi at the Battle of Panipat, Babur's son Humayun captured the family of the Lodi vassal Bikramjit, the ruler of Gwalior. The family, which was in Agra at the time, presented a diamond to him. The Baburnama identifies this diamond as the famous diamond of Alauddin, and states that every appraiser estimated its value at "two and half days food for the whole world". William Dalrymple notes that this diamond may or may not have been the Koh-i-Noor: there were several large diamonds in India at the time. When Humayun was fleeing India after being defeated at the Battle of Kannauj, an envoy of king Maldev of Jodhpur offered to buy the diamond. But Humayun refused, declaring that this diamond cannot be bought: it can only be taken by force or received as a favour. Humayun later gifted the diamond, along with other jewels, to the Safavid ruler Tahmasp I in return for asylum. According to Humayun's servant Jauhar, the Safavid jewelers declared these gifts to be "above all price". For unknown reasons, in 1547, Tahmasp sent the diamond to his Shia ally, the Nizam Shah of Ahmadnagar Sultanate in Deccan. However, Mihtar Jamal, the envoy carrying the diamond, absconded with it. Khur Shah, an ambassador of Ahmadnagar's rival Golconda Sultanate, confirms that this was Babur's diamond valued at "two and half days food for the whole world", although he mentions a slightly lower weight than the one mentioned by Babur. The Sultan of Ahmadnagar unsuccessfully tried to find and arrest the envoy, and the diamond does not find further mention in contemporary records.

Mir Jumla of Golconda presented a big diamond to Humayun's great-grandson Shah Jahan. Jean-Baptiste Tavernier, who saw this diamond in the treasury of Shah Jahan's son Aurangzeb in 1665, calls it the Great Mogul Diamond, and states that it came from the Kollur Mine. This diamond is said to have been badly cut by the Venetian lapidarist Hortensio Borgio since Mir Jumla gifted it. Later, many Victorian commentators identified this diamond with Babur's diamond and the Koh-i-Noor. However, such an identification does not appear in any earlier text. Most modern scholars identify the Great Mogul Diamond with the Orlov.

=== Early history ===
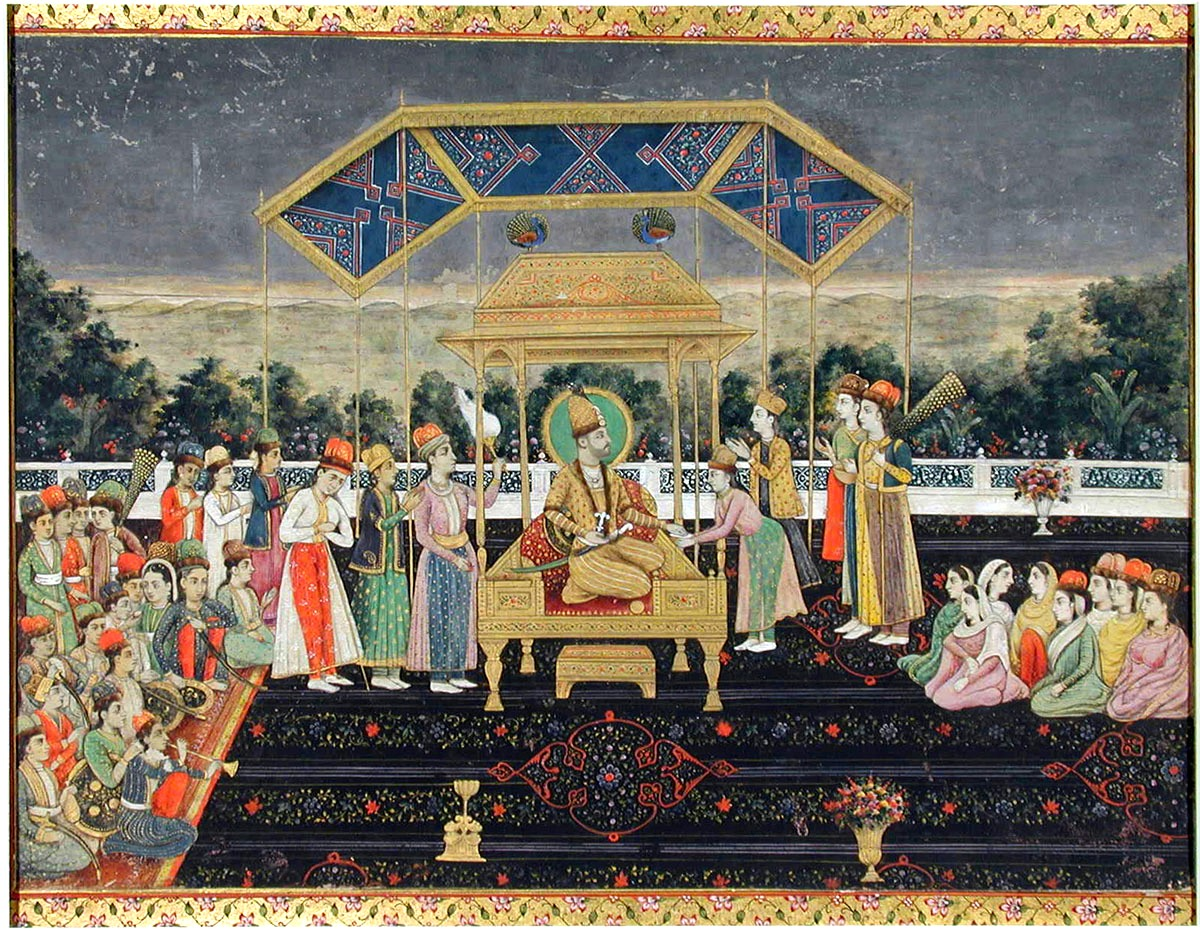
Nader Shah seated on the Peacock Throne after the defeat of the 13th Mughal emperor Muhammad Shah

The first uncontested mention of Koh-i-Noor is by Muhammad Kazim Marvi, the biographer of Nader Shah of Persia. According to Marvi, the Koh-i-Noor was embedded in the Peacock Throne, which had been commissioned by Shah Jahan in the previous century, and which Nader Shah looted during his 1738 invasion of India. According to the 19th century British civil servant Theo Metcalfe, the courtesan Nur Bai informed Nader Shah that the Mughal emperor Muhammad Shah had hidden the Koh-i-noor in his turban. Nader Shah, who had reinstated Muhammad Shah to the Mughal throne, insisted on swapping turbans with him as a token of friendship, and thus, obtained the Koh-i-Noor. According to Metcalfe, Nader Shah gave the diamond its name (literally "mountain of light") on this occasion. No contemporary source mentions this story, which is likely a myth originating from the account of the Mughal courtier Jugal Kishore, who states that Nader Shah gave Muhammad Shah his own turban ornament.

According to the Afghan chronicle Siraj al-Tawarikh, after Nader Shah's assassination in 1747, the first lady of his harem gave the Koh-i-noor to his general Ahmad Shah, who later established the Durrani Empire. According to another account, Nader Shah's grandson gave it to Ahmad Shah in 1751 in return for his support. One of Ahmad's grandsons, Shah Shuja Durrani, wore a bracelet containing the Koh-i-Noor on the occasion of Mountstuart Elphinstone's visit to Peshawar in 1808. A year later, Shah Shuja formed an alliance with the United Kingdom to help defend against a possible invasion of Afghanistan by Russia. He was quickly overthrown, but fled with the diamond to Lahore in the Sikh Empire (present-day Pakistan).

=== In Ranjit Singh's possession ===
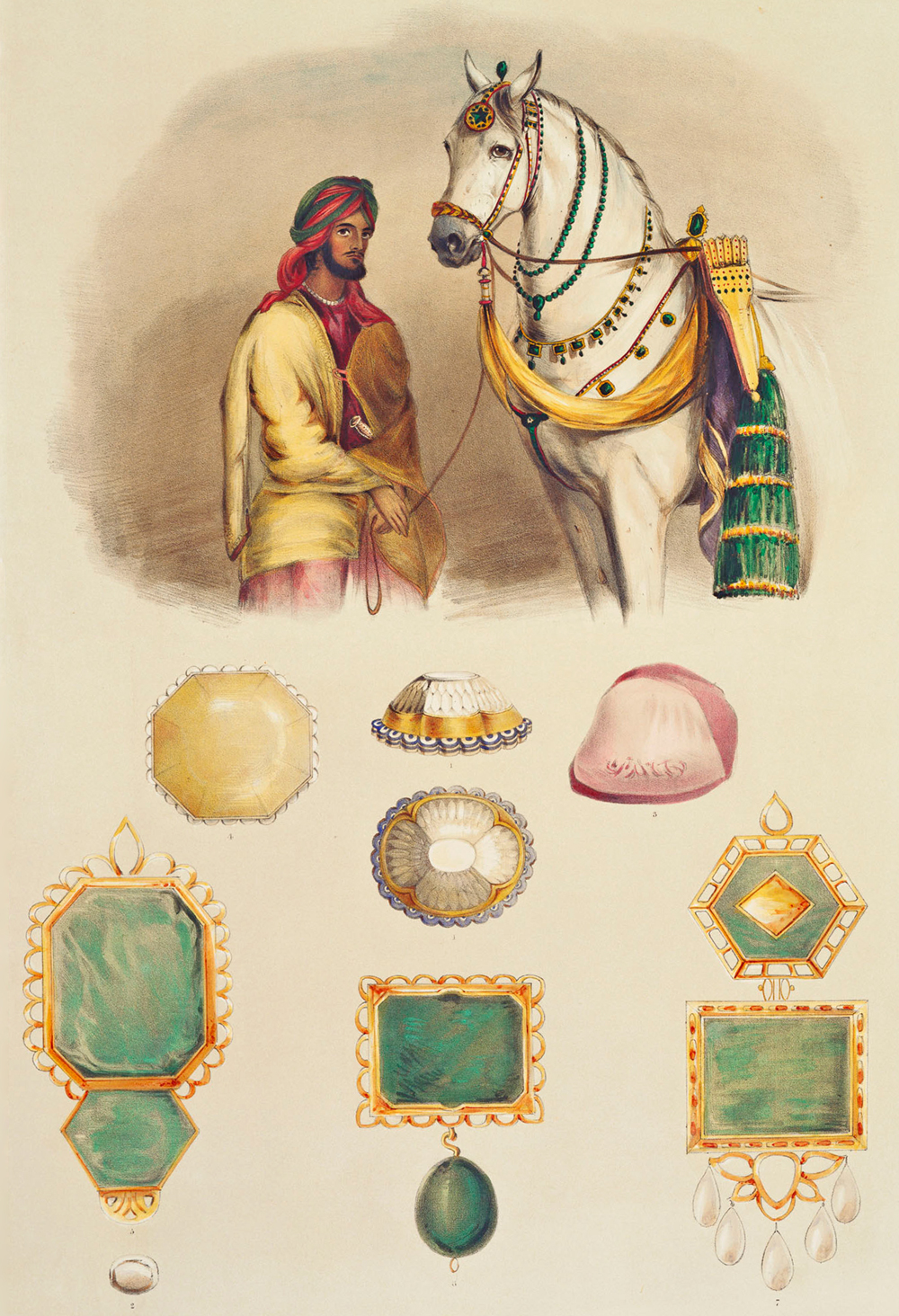
One of Ranjit Singh's favourite horses with the head of his stables. His jewels are shown, to scale, including the Koh-i-Noor (top centre).

Ranjit Singh, the founder of the Sikh Empire, took the possession of Koh-i-Noor from Shah Shuja in 1813. According to one account, Ranjit Singh insisted upon the gem being given to him, in return for his hospitality. Shah Shuja's memoirs state that Ranjit Singh extorted the diamond from him by having his son tortured in front of him.

Ranjit Singh had the diamond examined by jewelers of Lahore for two days to ensure that Shuja had not tricked him. After the jewelers confirmed its genuineness, he donated 125,000 rupees to Shuja. Ranjit Singh then asked the principal jewelers of Amritsar to estimate the diamond's value; the jewelers declared that the value of the diamond was "far beyond all computation". Ranjit Singh then affixed the diamond to the front of his turban, and paraded on an elephant to enable his subjects to see it. He used to wear it as an armlet during major festivals such as Diwali and Dusserah, and took it with him during travel. He would exhibit it to prominent visitors, especially British officers.

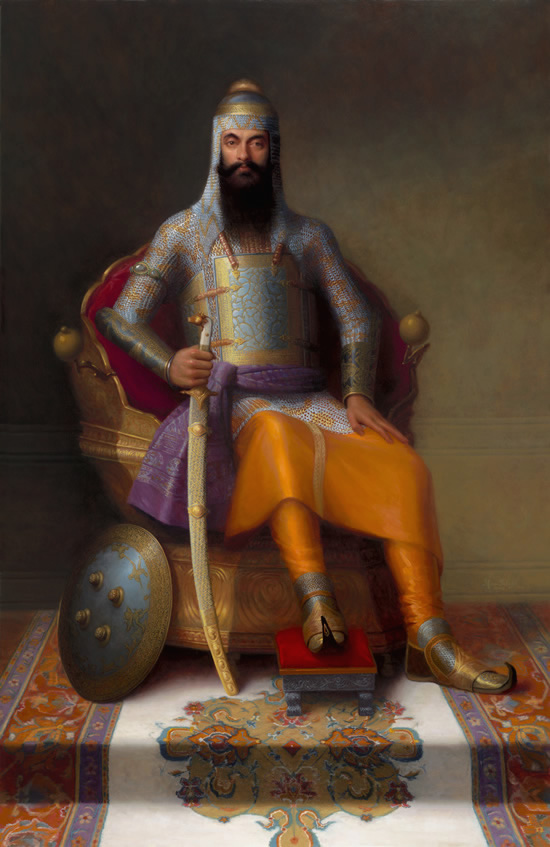
Modern painting of Ranjit Singh wearing the Koh-i-Noor armlet (2009)

One day, Ranjit Singh asked the diamond's former owners—Shuja and his wife Wafa Begum—to estimate its value. Wafa Begum replied that if a strong man threw a stone in four cardinal directions and vertically, Koh-i-Noor would be worth more than the gold and precious stones filled in the space. Ranjit Singh grew paranoid about the Koh-i-Noor being stolen, because in the past, another valuable jewel had been stolen from him while he was intoxicated. He kept the diamond within a high-security facility at the Gobindgarh Fort when it was not in use. When the diamond was to be transported, it was placed in a pannier on a guarded camel; 39 other camels with identical panniers were included in the convoy; the diamond was always placed on the first camel immediately behind the guards, but great secrecy was maintained regarding which camel carried it. Only Ranjit Singh's treasurer Misr Beli Ram knew which camel carried the diamond.

In June 1839, Ranjit Singh suffered his third stroke, and it became apparent that he would die soon. On his deathbed, he started giving away his valuable possessions to religious charities, and appointed his eldest son Kharak Singh as his successor. A day before his death, on 26 June 1839, a major argument broke out between his courtiers regarding the fate of Koh-i-Noor. Ranjit Singh himself was too weak to speak, and communicated using gestures. Bhai Gobind Ram, the head Brahmin of Ranjit Singh, insisted that the king had willed Koh-i-Noor and other jewels to the Jagannath Temple, Puri: the king apparently supported this claim through gestures, as recorded in his court chronicle Umdat-ut-Tawarikh. However, treasurer Beli Ram insisted that it was a state property rather than Ranjit Singh's personal property, and therefore, should be handed over to Kharak Singh.

After Ranjit Singh's death, Beli Ram refused to send the diamond to the temple, and hid it in his vaults. Meanwhile, Kharak Singh and wazir Dhian Singh also issued orders stating that the diamond should not be taken out of Lahore.

=== In Gulab Singh's possession ===
On 8 October 1839, the new emperor Kharak Singh was overthrown in a coup by his prime minister Dhian Singh. The prime minister's brother Gulab Singh, Raja of Jammu, came into possession of the Koh-i-Noor. Kharak Singh later died in prison, soon followed by the mysterious death of his son and successor Nau Nihal Singh on 5 November 1840. Gulab Singh held onto the stone until January 1841, when he presented it to emperor Sher Singh in order to win his favour, after his brother Dhian Singh negotiated a ceasefire between Sher Singh and the overthrown empress Chand Kaur. Gulab Singh had attempted to defend the widowed empress at her fort in Lahore, during two days of conflict and shelling by Sher Singh and his troops. Despite handing over the Koh-i-Noor, Gulab Singh as a result of the ceasefire returned safely to Jammu with a wealth of gold and other jewels taken from the treasury.

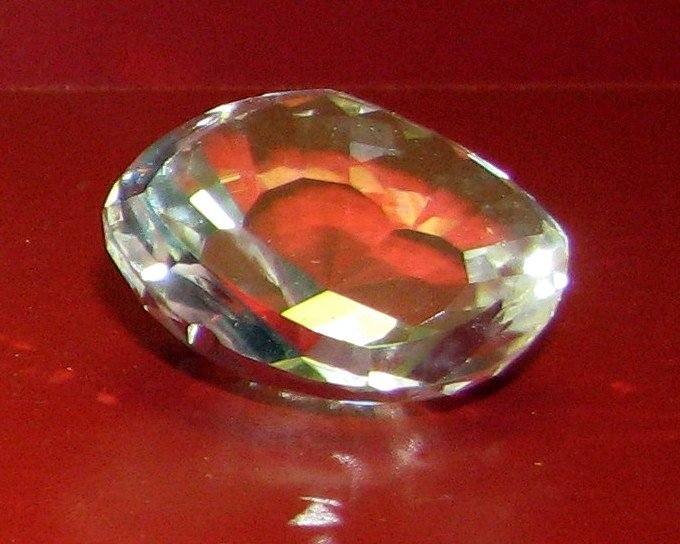
A glass replica of the Koh-i-Noor in its original form, turned upside down

==== Worn by child emperor Duleep Singh ====
On 15 September 1843, both Sher Singh and prime minister Dhian Singh were assassinated in a coup led by Ajit Singh Sandhawalia. However, the next day in a counter coup led by Dhian's son Hira Singh the assassins were killed. Aged 24, Hira Singh succeeded his father as prime minister, and installed the five-year old Duleep Singh as emperor. The Koh-i-Noor was now fastened to the arm of the child emperor in court at Lahore. Duleep Singh and his mother empress Jind Kaur, had till then resided in Jammu, the kingdom governed by Gulab Singh.

Following his nephew Prime Minister Hira Singh's assassination on 27 March 1844, and the subsequent outbreak of the First Anglo-Sikh War, Gulab Singh himself led the Sikh empire as its prime minister, and despite defeat in the war, he became the first Maharaja of Jammu and Kashmir on 16 March 1846, under the Treaty of Amritsar.

=== Surrender to Queen Victoria ===
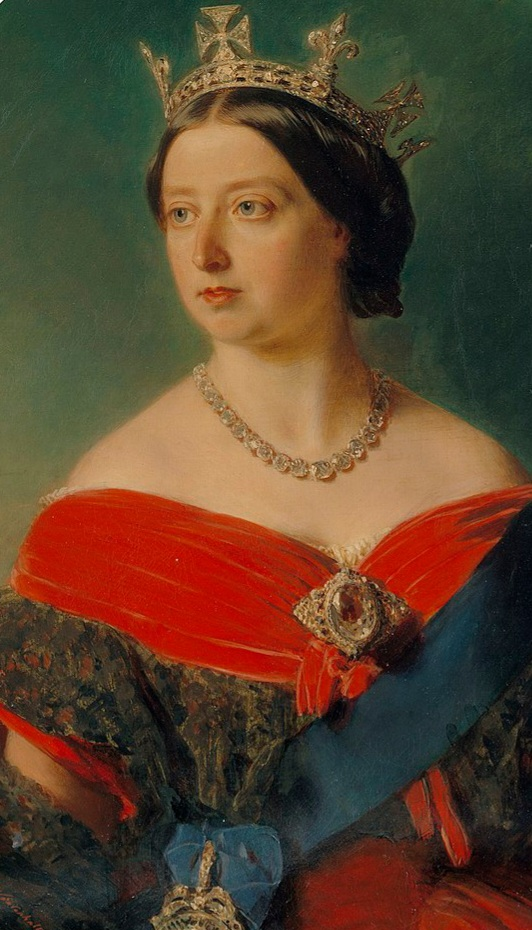
Queen Victoria wearing the Koh-i-Noor as a brooch, by Franz Xaver Winterhalter

On 29 March 1849, following the conclusion of the Second Anglo-Sikh War, the remaining territories of the Sikh Empire were formally annexed to Company rule, and the Last Treaty of Lahore was signed, officially ceding the Koh-i-Noor to Queen Victoria and the Maharaja's other assets to the company. Article III of the treaty read:

The gem called the Koh-i-Noor, which was taken from Shah Sooja-ool-moolk by Maharajah Ranjeet Singh, shall be surrendered by the Maharajah of Lahore to the Queen of England.

The lead signatory of the treaty for the by then eleven-year-old Maharaja Duleep Singh was his commander-in-chief Tej Singh, a loyalist of Maharaja Gulab Singh who had previously been in possession of the Koh-i-Noor and gained Kashmir from the Sikh empire, via treaty with Britain, following the First Anglo-Sikh War.

The Governor-General in charge of the ratification of this treaty was the Marquess of Dalhousie. The manner of his aiding in the transfer of the diamond was criticized even by some of his contemporaries in Britain. Although some thought it should have been presented as a gift to Queen Victoria by the East India Company, it is clear that Dalhousie believed the stone was a spoil of war, and treated it accordingly, ensuring that it was officially surrendered to her by Duleep Singh, the youngest son of Ranjit Singh. The presentation of the Koh-i-Noor by the East India Company to the queen was the latest in a long history of transfers of the diamond as a coveted spoil of war. Duleep Singh had been placed in the guardianship of Dr John Spencer Login, a surgeon in the East India Company Army serving in the Presidency of Bengal. Duleep Singh moved to England in 1854 and spent the rest of his life in exile.

==== Journey to the United Kingdom ====
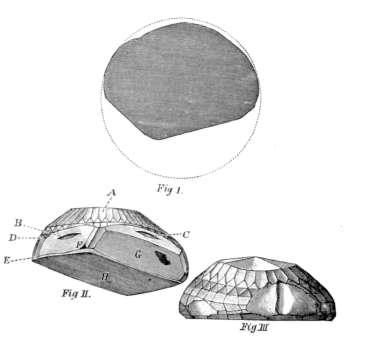
Diagram of the pre-1852 cut.: Fig I. Shaded area is the base.; Fig II. A: flaw; B and C: notches cut to hold stone in a setting; D: flaw created by fracture at E; F: fracture created by a blow; G: unpolished cleavage plane; H: basal cleavage plane.; Fig III. Opposite side, showing facets and peak of the "Mountain of Light"

In due course, the Governor-General received the Koh-i-Noor from Dr Login, who had been appointed Governor of the Citadel, on 6 April 1848 under a receipt dated 7 December 1849, in the presence of members of the Board of Administration for the affairs of the Punjab: Sir Henry Lawrence (President), C. G. Mansel, John Lawrence and Sir Henry Elliot (Secretary to the Government of India).

Legend in the Lawrence family has it that before the voyage, John Lawrence left the jewel in his waistcoat pocket when it was sent to be laundered, and was most grateful when it was returned promptly by the valet who found it.

On 1 February 1850, the jewel was sealed in a small iron safe inside a red dispatch box, both sealed with red tape and a wax seal and kept in a chest at Bombay Treasury awaiting a steamer ship from China. It was then sent to England for presentation to Queen Victoria in the care of Captain J. Ramsay and Brevet Lt. Col F. Mackeson under tight security arrangements, one of which was the placement of the dispatch box in a larger iron safe. They departed from Bombay on 6 April on board HMS Medea, captained by Captain Lockyer.

The ship had a difficult voyage: an outbreak of cholera on board when the ship was in Mauritius had the locals demanding its departure, and they asked their governor to open fire on the vessel and destroy it if there was no response. Shortly afterwards, the vessel was hit by a severe gale that blew for some 12 hours.

On arrival in Britain on 29 June, the passengers and mail were unloaded in Plymouth, but the Koh-i-Noor stayed on board until the ship reached Spithead, near Portsmouth, on 1 July. The next morning, Ramsay and Mackeson, in the company of Mr Onslow, the private secretary to the chairman of the Court of Directors of the British East India Company, proceeded by train to East India House in the City of London and passed the diamond into the care of the chairman and deputy chairman of the East India Company.

The Koh-i-Noor was formally presented to Queen Victoria on 3 July 1850 at Buckingham Palace by the deputy chairman of the East India Company. The date had been chosen to coincide with the company's 250th anniversary.

=== The Great Exhibition ===
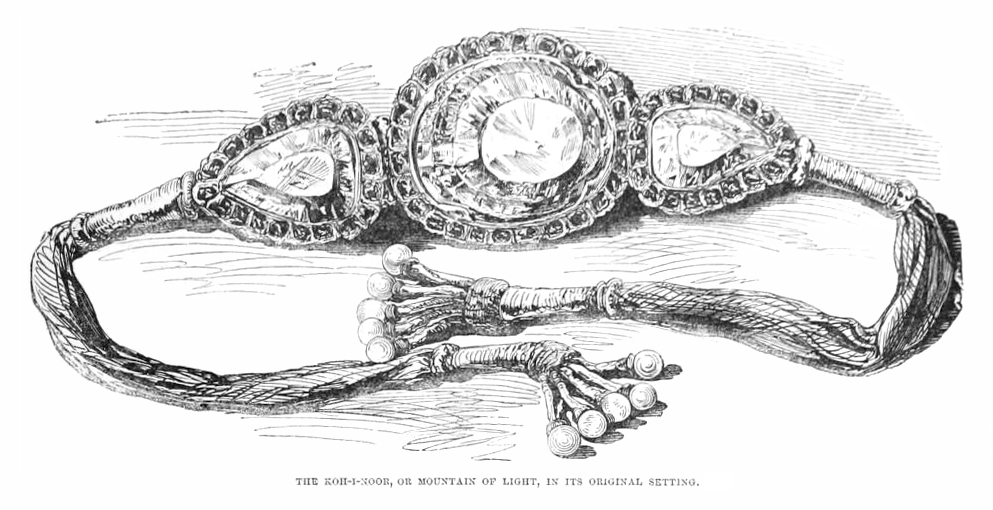
In the armlet given to Victoria

Members of the public were given a chance to see the Koh-i-Noor when The Great Exhibition was staged at Hyde Park, London, in 1851. It represented the might of the British Empire and took pride of place in the eastern part of the central gallery.

Its mysterious past and advertised value of £1–2 million drew large crowds. At first, the stone was put inside a gilded birdcage, but after complaints about its dull appearance, the Koh-i-Noor was moved to a case with black velvet and gas lamps in the hope that it would sparkle better. Despite this, the flawed and asymmetrical diamond still failed to please viewers.

=== 1852 re-cutting ===
Originally, the diamond had 169 facets and was 4.1 centimetres (1.6 in) long, 3.26 centimetres (1.28 in) wide, and 1.62 centimetres (0.64 in) deep. It was high-domed, with a flat base and both triangular and rectangular facets, similar in overall appearance to other Mughal-era diamonds which are now in the Iranian Crown Jewels.

Disappointment in the appearance of the stone was not uncommon; Punch magazine referred to it as the "Mountain of Darkness," a play on the English translation of its name as "Mountain of Light". After consulting mineralogists, including Sir David Brewster, Victoria's husband Prince Albert with the consent of the government decided to have the diamond re-cut. For this task, he employed one of the largest and most famous Dutch diamond merchants, Mozes Coster. He sent to London one of his most experienced artisans, Levie Benjamin Voorzanger, and his assistants.

The 1852 re-cutting

On 17 July 1852, the cutting began at the factory of Garrard & Co. in Haymarket, using a steam-powered mill built specially for the job by Maudslay, Sons and Field. Supervised by Albert and the Duke of Wellington, and the technical direction of the Queen's mineralogist, James Tennant, the cutting took 38 days, cost Albert £8,000, and reduced the diamond from 186 old carats (191 modern carats or 38.2 g) to its current weight 105.6 carats (21.12 g). The stone now measures 3.6 cm (1.4 in) long, 3.2 cm (1.3 in) wide, and 1.3 cm (0.5 in) deep. Brilliant-cut diamonds usually have 58 facets, but the Koh-i-Noor has 8 additional "star" facets around the culet, making a total of 66 facets.

The great loss of weight was to some extent due to removal of several flaws, one especially big, which Voorzanger discovered. Although Prince Albert was dissatisfied with such a huge reduction, most experts agreed that Voorzanger had made the right decision and did the job with impeccable skill. When Queen Victoria showed the re-cut diamond to the young Maharaja Duleep Singh, the Koh-i-Noor's last non-British owner, he was apparently unable to speak for several minutes afterwards.

The much lighter but more dazzling stone was mounted in a honeysuckle brooch and a circlet worn by the queen. At this time, it belonged to her personally, and was not yet part of the Crown Jewels. Although Victoria wore it often, she became uneasy about the way in which the diamond had been acquired. In a letter to her eldest daughter, Victoria, Princess Royal, she wrote in the 1870s: "No one feels more strongly than I do about India or how much I opposed our taking those countries and I think no more will be taken, for it is very wrong and no advantage to us. You know also how I dislike wearing the Koh-i-Noor".

=== Crown Jewel ===
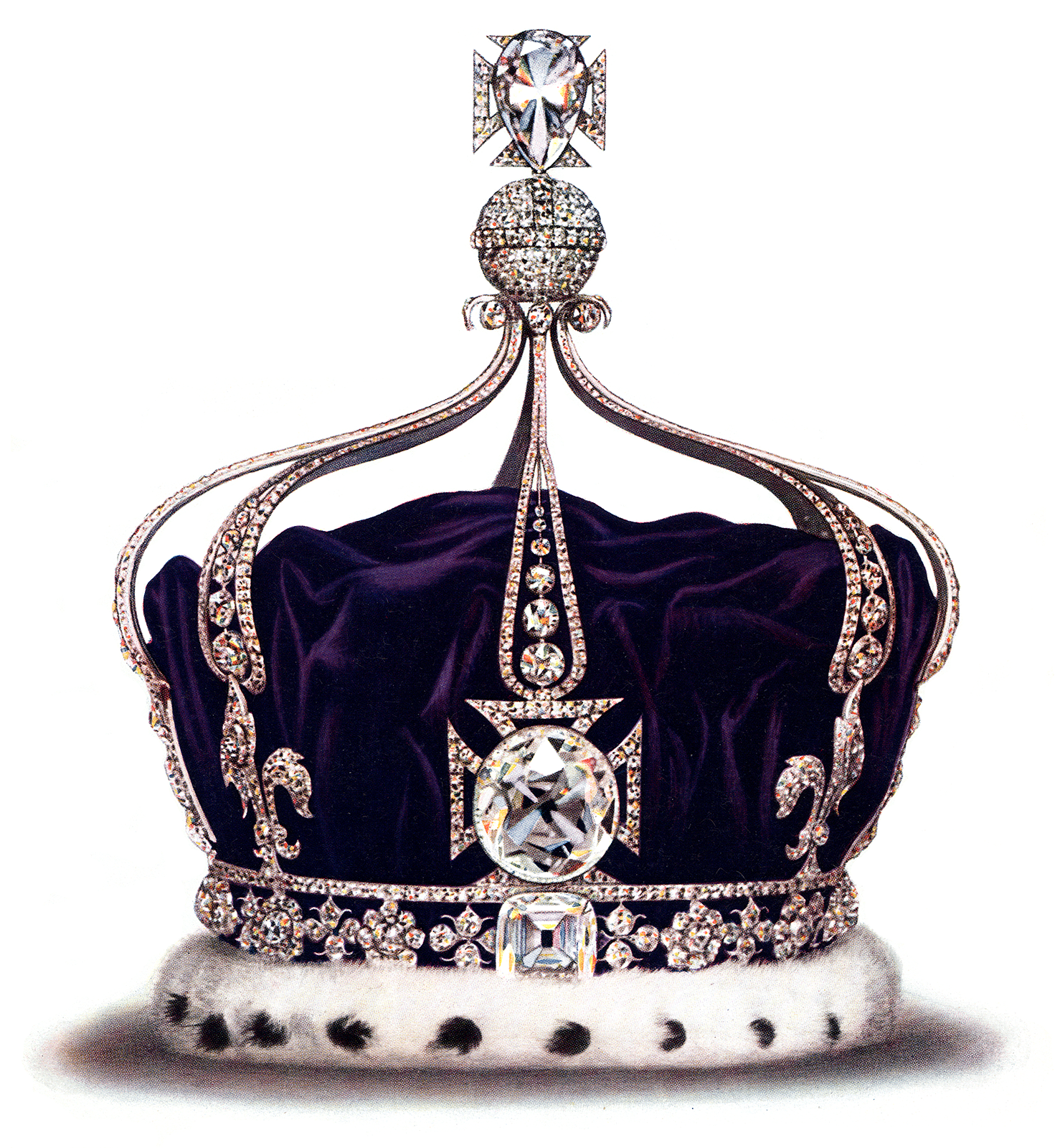
The Koh-i-Noor diamond in the front cross of Queen Mary's Crown

After Queen Victoria's death, the Koh-i-Noor was set in the Crown of Queen Alexandra, the wife of Edward VII, which was used to crown her at their coronation in 1902. The diamond was transferred to the Crown of Queen Mary in 1911 and finally to the Crown of Queen Elizabeth the Queen Mother in 1937. When the Queen Mother died in 2002 the crown was placed on top of her coffin for the lying-in-state and funeral. Queen Camilla was crowned with Queen Mary's Crown at the Coronation of Charles III and Camilla on 6 May 2023, but without the Koh-i-Noor diamond.

All these crowns are on display in the Jewel House at the Tower of London with crystal replicas of the diamond set in the older crowns. The original bracelet given to Queen Victoria can also be seen there. A glass model of the Koh-i-Noor shows visitors how it looked when it was brought to the United Kingdom. Replicas of the diamond in this and its re-cut forms can also be seen in the "Vault" exhibit at the Natural History Museum, London.

During the Second World War the Crown Jewels were moved from their home at the Tower of London to Windsor Castle. They were kept in leather hat boxes under lock and key in the office of the Royal Librarian, Sir Owen Morshead, until 1941, when they were transferred to a specially dug tunnel under the walls of the castle. At this time Morshead and the Keeper of the Tower Armouries removed some of the larger stones, including the Koh-i-Noor, wrapped them in cotton wool and placed them in a glass preserving-jar, which was then placed in a biscuit tin, the thinking being that, unlike the bulkier crowns, this would allow their swift relocation if the Germans invaded.

== Ownership dispute ==
The Koh-i-Noor has long been a subject of diplomatic controversy: India, Pakistan, Iran and Afghanistan have all requested its return from the UK at various times.

=== India ===
The Government of India first demanded the return of the Koh-i-Noor as soon as independence was granted in 1947. A second request followed in 1953, the year of the coronation of Queen Elizabeth II. Each time, the British Government rejected the claims, saying that ownership was non-negotiable.

In 2000 several members of the Indian Parliament signed a letter calling for the diamond to be given back to India, claiming it was taken illegally. British officials said that a variety of claims meant it was impossible to establish the diamond's original owner, and that it had been part of Britain's heritage for more than 150 years.

In July 2010, while visiting India, David Cameron, the prime minister of the United Kingdom, said of returning the diamond, "If you say yes to one you suddenly find the British Museum would be empty. I am afraid to say, it is going to have to stay put." On a subsequent visit in February 2013, he said, "They're not having that back."

In April 2016, during a public interest litigation hearing at the Supreme Court of India, Ranjit Kumar—the then Solicitor General of India representing the Ministry of Culture and the Archaeological Survey of India (ASI)—said that it "was neither stolen nor forcibly taken away" and "given voluntarily." The solicitor general's comments triggered public and political backlash, Indian National Congress leader Digvijaya Singh criticised the ruling Bharatiya Janata Party government for its stance on the issue. The Indian culture ministry later retracted Kumar's statement and said that it did not reflect the views of the government, adding that an official court submission hadn't been made and that it would make "all possible efforts" to arrange the return of the Koh-i-Noor to India.

In 2018, replying to a Right to Information question asking "the grounds on which the possession of the Kohinoor Diamond was transferred" and "whether it was a gift to the United Kingdom's by the Indian Authorities", the ASI stated:

As per the records Lahore treaty held between Lord Dalhousie and Maharaja Duleep Singh in 1849, Kohinoor Diamond was surrendered by the Maharaja of Lahore to the Queen of England. The extract of the treaty is as under:- "The gem called kohinoor which was taken from Shah Suja-ul-Mulk by Maharajah Ranjeet Singh shall be surrendered by the Maharaja of Lahore to the Queen of England". The contents of the treaty indicated that the Kohinoor was not handed over to British on the wishes of Duleep Singh. More over Duleep Singh was a minor at the time of the treaty.

=== Pakistan ===
In 1976, Pakistan asserted its ownership of the diamond, saying its return would be "a convincing demonstration of the spirit that moved Britain voluntarily to shed its imperial encumbrances and lead the process of decolonisation". In a letter to the prime minister of Pakistan, Zulfikar Ali Bhutto, the prime minister of the United Kingdom, James Callaghan, wrote, "I need not remind you of the various hands through which the stone has passed over the past two centuries, nor that explicit provision for its transfer to the British crown was made in the peace treaty with the Maharajah of the Sikh Empire in 1849. I could not advise Her Majesty that it should be surrendered."

=== Afghanistan ===
In 2000, the Taliban's foreign affairs spokesman, Faiz Ahmed Faiz, said the Koh-i-Noor was the legitimate property of Afghanistan, and demanded for it to be handed over to the regime. "The history of the diamond shows it was taken from us (Afghanistan) to India, and from there to Britain. We have a much better claim than the Indians", he said. The Afghan claim derives from Shah Shuja Durrani's memoirs, which states he surrendered the diamond to Ranjit Singh while Singh was having his son tortured in front of him, so he argued that the Maharajah of Lahore acquired the stone illegitimately.

=== Proposed compromises ===
Because of the disputes over the diamond's rightful ownership, there have been various compromises suggested. These include dividing it into four, with a piece given to each of Afghanistan, India, and Pakistan, with the final piece retained by the British Crown. Another suggestion is that the jewel be housed in a special museum at the Wagah border between India and Pakistan. However this suggestion does not cater to Afghan claims, nor the reality of current British possession. The British Government rejects these compromises, and has stated since the end of the British Raj that the status of the diamond is "non-negotiable".

== In literature and popular culture ==
A rumor that the Koh-i-Noor is cursed may have originated with the Delhi Gazette; it was soon repeated in The Illustrated London News, and Queen Victoria herself expressed concern about the curse. This led to a counter-rumor that the curse attached only to male rulers.

The first line of "Résignation," the first poem in Paul Verlaine's collection Poèmes saturniens (1868), references the Koh-i-Noor.

The Koh-i-Noor was one of the inspirations for the eponymous gemstone in The Moonstone (1868), a 19th-century British epistolary novel by Wilkie Collins, generally considered to be the first full-length detective novel in the English language. In his preface to the first edition of the book, Collins says that he based his eponymous "Moonstone" on the histories of two stones: the Orlov, a 189.62-carat (37.9 g) diamond in the Russian Imperial Sceptre, and the Koh-i-Noor. In the 1966 Penguin Books edition of The Moonstone, J. I. M. Stewart states that Collins used G. C. King's The Natural History, Ancient and Modern, of Precious Stones ... (1865) to research the history of the Koh-i-Noor.

The Koh-i-Noor also features in Agatha Christie's 1925 detective novel The Secret of Chimneys where it is hidden somewhere inside a large country house and is discovered at the end of the novel. The diamond had been stolen from the Tower of London by a Parisian gang leader who replaced it with a replica stone.

The Koh-i-Noor is a central plot point in George MacDonald Fraser's 1990 historical novel and satire, Flashman and the Mountain of Light, which refers to the diamond in its title.

Kohinoor, a 2005 Indian mystery television series, follows a search for the diamond after its supposed return to India.

The re-booted Doctor Who series also features the Koh-i-Noor in 2006 episode "Tooth and Claw", where the light of the Koh-i-Noor is so powerful and with full moonlight, can kill the werewolf in the episode.

The Koh-i-Noor is a main part of the 2014 Indian film Bang Bang!.

The Koh-i-Noor features heavily in the in-universe lore of Assassin's Creed where it is depicted a Piece of Eden, a relic made by the Isu, an ancient precursor race. The Koh-i-Noor itself is featured in the 2016 spin-off video game Assassin's Creed Chronicles: India and in the 2015 video game Assassin's Creed: Syndicate, where it is revealed that the "real" Koh-i-Noor owned by the Royal family is a fake while the true artifact remains with the Assassins.

Kolkatay Kohinoor, a 2019 mystery thriller film, is based on a similar premise and explores the diamond's fictional relations to Kolkata.

== See also ==
- Daria-i-Noor
- Golconda Diamonds
- List of diamonds
- List of largest rough diamonds
- Cullinan Diamond

== Bibliography ==
- Argenzio, Victor (1977). Crystal Clear: The Story of Diamonds. David McKay Co. ISBN 978-0-679-20317-9.
- Balfour, Ian (2009). Famous Diamonds. Antique Collectors' Club. ISBN 978-1-85149-479-8.
- Bari, Hubert; Sautter, Violaine (2001). Diamonds: In the Heart of the Earth, in the Heart of Stars, at the Heart of Power. Vilo International. ISBN 978-2-84576-032-5. Archived from the original on 9 December 2019.
- Broun-Ramsay, James Andrew (1911). Private Letters (2 ed.). India: Blackwood.
- Dalrymple, William; Anand, Anita (2017). Koh-i-Noor: The History of the World's Most Infamous Diamond. Bloomsbury. ISBN 978-1-408-88886-5.
- Davenport, Cyril (1897). The English Regalia. K. Paul, Trench, Trübner & Co. Archived from the original on 24 March 2016.
- Davis, John R. (1999). The Great Exhibition. Sutton. ISBN 978-0-7509-1614-1.
- Dixon-Smith, Sally; Edwards, Sebastian; Kilby, Sarah; Murphy, Clare; Souden, David; Spooner, Jane; Worsley, Lucy (2010). The Crown Jewels: Souvenir Guidebook. Historic Royal Palaces. ISBN 978-1-873993-13-2.
- Eden, Emily (1844). Portraits of the Princes and People of India. J. Dickinson & Son. p. 14.
- Fanthorpe, Lionel; Fanthorpe, Patricia (2009). Secrets of the World's Undiscovered Treasures. Dundurn. ISBN 978-1-77070-508-1. Archived from the original on 31 December 2019.
- Goodlad, Lauren M. E. (2015). The Victorian Geopolitical Aesthetic: Realism, Sovereignty, and Transnational Experience. Oxford University Press. ISBN 978-0-19-872827-6. Archived from the original on 27 December 2019.
- Hennessy, Elizabeth (1992). A Domestic History of the Bank of England, 1930–1960. Cambridge University Press. p. 237. ISBN 978-0-521-39140-5.
- Hofmeester, Karin; Grewe, Bernd-Stefan, eds. (2016). Luxury in Global Perspective: Objects and Practices, 1600–2000. Cambridge University Press. ISBN 978-1-107-10832-5.
- Howie, R. A. (1999). "Book Reviews" (PDF). Mineralogical Magazine. Vol. 63, no. 2. Mineralogical Society of Great Britain and Ireland. Archived from the original on 14 June 2018.
- Israel, Nigel B. (1992). "'The Most Unkindest Cut of All' - Recutting the Koh-i-Nur". Journal of Gemmology. 23 (3): 176. Bibcode:1992JGem...23..176I. doi:10.15506/JoG.1992.23.3.176. ISSN 0022-1252.
- Keay, Anna (2011). The Crown Jewels. Thames & Hudson. ISBN 978-0-500-51575-4. Archived from the original on 27 December 2019.
- Kurien, T. K. (1980). Geology and Mineral Resources of Andhra Pradesh. Geological Survey of India. Archived from the original on 30 December 2019.
- Lafont, Jean Marie (2002). Maharaja Ranjit Singh: Lord of the Five Rivers. Oxford University Press. ISBN 978-0-19-566111-8.
- Login, Lena Campbell (1890). Sir John Login and Duleep Singh. Punjab: Languages Dept. Archived from the original on 7 April 2010.
- Mears, Kenneth J. (1988). The Tower of London: 900 Years of English History. Phaidon. ISBN 978-0-7148-2527-4. Archived from the original on 19 February 2017.
- Mears, Kenneth J.; Thurley, Simon; Murphy, Claire (1994). The Crown Jewels. Historic Royal Palaces. ASIN B000HHY1ZQ.
- Rastogi, P. N. (1986). Ethnic Tensions in Indian Society: Explanation, Prediction, Monitoring and Control. Mittal Publications. ISBN 978-9-997-38489-8.
- Rose, Tessa (1992). The Coronation Ceremony and the Crown Jewels. HM Stationery Office. ISBN 978-0-117-01361-2. Archived from the original on 27 December 2019.
- Smith, Henry George (1896). Gems and Precious Stones. Charles Potter. Archived from the original on 21 January 2013.
- Streeter, Edwin William; Hatten, Joseph (1882). The Great Diamonds of the World. G. Bell & Sons. Archived from the original on 4 June 2017.
- Sucher, Scott D.; Carriere, Dale P. (2008). "The Use of Laser and X-ray Scanning to Create a Model of the Historic Koh-i-Noor Diamond". Gems & Gemology. 44 (2): 124–141. Bibcode:2008GemG...44..124S. doi:10.5741/GEMS.44.2.124.
- Tarling, Nicholas (April 1981). "The Wars of British Succession". New Zealand Journal of History. 15 (1). University of Auckland. ISSN 0028-8322. Archived (PDF) from the original on 1 February 2016.
- Tarshis, Dena K. (2000). "The Koh-i-Noor Diamond and its Glass Replica at the Crystal Palace Exhibition". Journal of Glass Studies. 42. Corning Museum of Glass: 133–143. ISSN 0075-4250. JSTOR 24191006.
- Young, Paul (2007). ""Carbon, Mere Carbon": The Kohinoor, the Crystal Palace, and the Mission to Make Sense of British India". Nineteenth-Century Contexts. 29 (4): 343–358. doi:10.1080/08905490701768089. S2CID 144262612.
- Younghusband, Sir George; Davenport, Cyril (1919). The Crown Jewels of England. Cassell & Co. ASIN B00086FM86.
