= Princie Diamond =

Diamond

- Weight: 34.65 carats (6.930 g)
- Color: Intense Pink
- Cut: Cushion-cut
- Country of origin: India
- Mine of origin: Golconda mines
- Estimated value: US $40 million

The Princie Diamond is an approximately 34.65-carat cushion-cut fancy intense pink diamond discovered 300 years ago in the Golconda mines. Christie's (who auctioned it on 16 April 2013, when it fetched a price of 39.3 million dollars) say that the Princie Diamond is believed to be the fourth largest pink diamond in the world, after the Daria-i-Noor (c. 175 to 195 carats), the Noor-ol-Ain (c. 60 carats) - which are both part of the Iranian Crown Jewels; both were cut, according to experts, from one single c. 242-carat pink diamond, - and the Pink Star (formerly known as the Steinmetz Pink), a diamond weighing 59.60 carats.

== Physical properties ==
The Gemological Institute of America characterizes the Princie Diamond as fancy intense pink, natural color, VS2 clarity, Type IIa. The Princie diamond is at this time the largest Golconda-type fancy intense pink diamond ever to be graded at the Gemological Institute of America. The Princie also has the property that when exposed to ultraviolet light it displays bright orangey-red fluorescence. According to the Gemological Institute of America this kind of reaction to ultraviolet light is typical of diamonds of Indian origin. Of more than 7 million diamonds that have gone through the Gemological Institute of America's laboratory, no more than 40 exhibited this phenomenon and the Princie is the largest pink diamond that possesses it.

== History ==
The diamond was discovered about 300 years ago in the Golconda mines. Long before it was known as the "Princie" or by any other name, it belonged to the royal family (Nizams) of Hyderabad, its first known owners. The then Nizam of Hyderabad had it auctioned in 1960 at Sotheby's. It was bought by the London branch of the jewelers Van Cleef & Arpels for 46,000 British pounds. It was then sent to their Paris store where it was named "Princie" by Pierre Arpels in honor of the fourteen-year-old son of Sita Devi, the Maharanee of Baroda, Sayajirao Gaekwad (1945–1985).

== 2013 auction ==
It was auctioned by Christie's in New York on 16 April 2013 for what was a record-breaking price. It was expected to sell for more than 45 million dollars. In the event it only fetched 39.3 million dollars which is still a record-breaking price. It set the records for being the most valuable Golconda mine diamond ever sold at auction and for the highest price for any jewel sold at Christie's, surpassing the previous house record of 24.4 million dollars, set in December 2008 with the sale of the Wittelsbach-Graff Diamond. It was purchased by an anonymous collector bidding by phone.

== See also ==
- List of diamonds
