= Violaine Sautter =

French planetary scientist

Violaine Sautter is a French planetary scientist. Her early work involved the geology at ultradeep levels of the Earth; more recently, her interests have turned to the geology of Mars, particularly concentrating on Martian meteorites and the Gale Crater. She is a director of research for the French National Centre for Scientific Research (CNRS), affiliated with the Institut de minéralogie, de physique des matériaux et de cosmochimie (IMPMC) at Sorbonne University.

== Education and career ==
Sautter earned a Ph.D. in 1983 through the National Museum of Natural History, France (MNHN) and Pierre and Marie Curie University, and completed a Thèse d’Etat in 1989 at Pierre and Marie Curie University. Her 1989 dissertation, Le clinopyroxène alumineux : la mémoire chimique du manteau supérieur lithosphérique, was directed by Olivier Jaoul.

After postdoctoral research in the Grant Institute of Geology at the University of Edinburgh, she joined the CNRS as a junior scientist in 1985, and has been a director of research since 2000.

== Book ==
Sautter is coauthor with Hubert Bari of Diamonds: In the Heart of the Earth, in the Heart of Stars, at the Heart of Power, the catalog of a 2001 exhibit at the National Museum of Natural History, France, published by Vilo International in 2001.

== Recognition ==
Sautter received the CNRS Bronze Medal in 1991, and the CNRS Silver Medal in 2016.

She was the 2002 winner of the Raymond Furon Prize of the Société géologique de France.
