= Nizam Diamond =

Famous diamond mined in India

- Weight: 340 carats (68 g)
- Cut: Almond
- Country of origin: India
- Mine of origin: Kollur Mine, Andhra
- Original owner: The Nizam of Hyderabad

The Nizam Diamond, also known as the "little Koh-i-Noor", was a famous diamond in the 1800s. Its whereabouts today are unknown. It was named after its original owner Mir Osman Ali Khan, the last Nizam of Hyderabad. The diamond is said to have been around 340 carats (68 g) in size, and was mined from the now-submerged Kollur mine in the Krishna River valley in the year 1830.

Richard Francis Burton described it in an 1876 article:

The stone is said to be of the finest water. An outline of the model gives a maximum length of 1 inch 10'25 lines, and 1 inch 2 lines for the greatest breadth, with conformable thickness throughout. The face is slightly convex, and the cleavage plane produced by the fracture is nearly flat, with a curious slope or groove beginning at the apex. The general appearance is an imperfect oval, with only one projection which will require the saw: it will easily cut into a splendid brilliant, larger and more valuable than the present Koh-i-núr. [The Koh-i-noor diamond was cut down from 191 modern carats (38.2 g) to 105.6 carats (21.1 g) in 1852.]

The stone went missing shortly after the 1948 Annexation of Hyderabad.

== See also ==
- List of diamonds
