= Al Thani Collection =

Art collection on exhibition in Paris

The Al Thani Collection is a collection of art representing civilizations around the world, highlights from which are on view in the Hôtel de la Marine, on the Place de la Concorde, in Paris. It was assembled by Sheikh Hamad bin Abdullah Al Thani, first cousin of the Emir of Qatar. Portions of the collection previously toured different museums around the world, including the Metropolitan Museum of Art in New York, the Victoria and Albert Museum in London, and the Legion of Honor Museum in San Francisco. Beginning in late 2021 it occupied a wing of the newly restored Hôtel de la Marine in Paris, under agreement with the Centre des monuments nationaux of the French Ministry of Culture. Under the agreement, it will remain for twenty years.

The collection is located in a section of the Hôtel de la Marine which formerly displayed tapestries from the French Royal Collection. It displays at one time one hundred-twenty works, out of a total of more than five thousand works in the collection. It presents objects from ancient civilizations in Europe, Asia, Africa, the Americas, and the Middle East, related by theme. The exposition was designed by Tsuyoshi Tane. The first of the four galleries is called "A Window on World Civilisations", with seven objects from different cultures. The second gallery has eleven showcases, by theme. The third is reserved for temporary exhibitions. The fourth, 18 meters long, offers a tour of objects from different ancient treasuries.

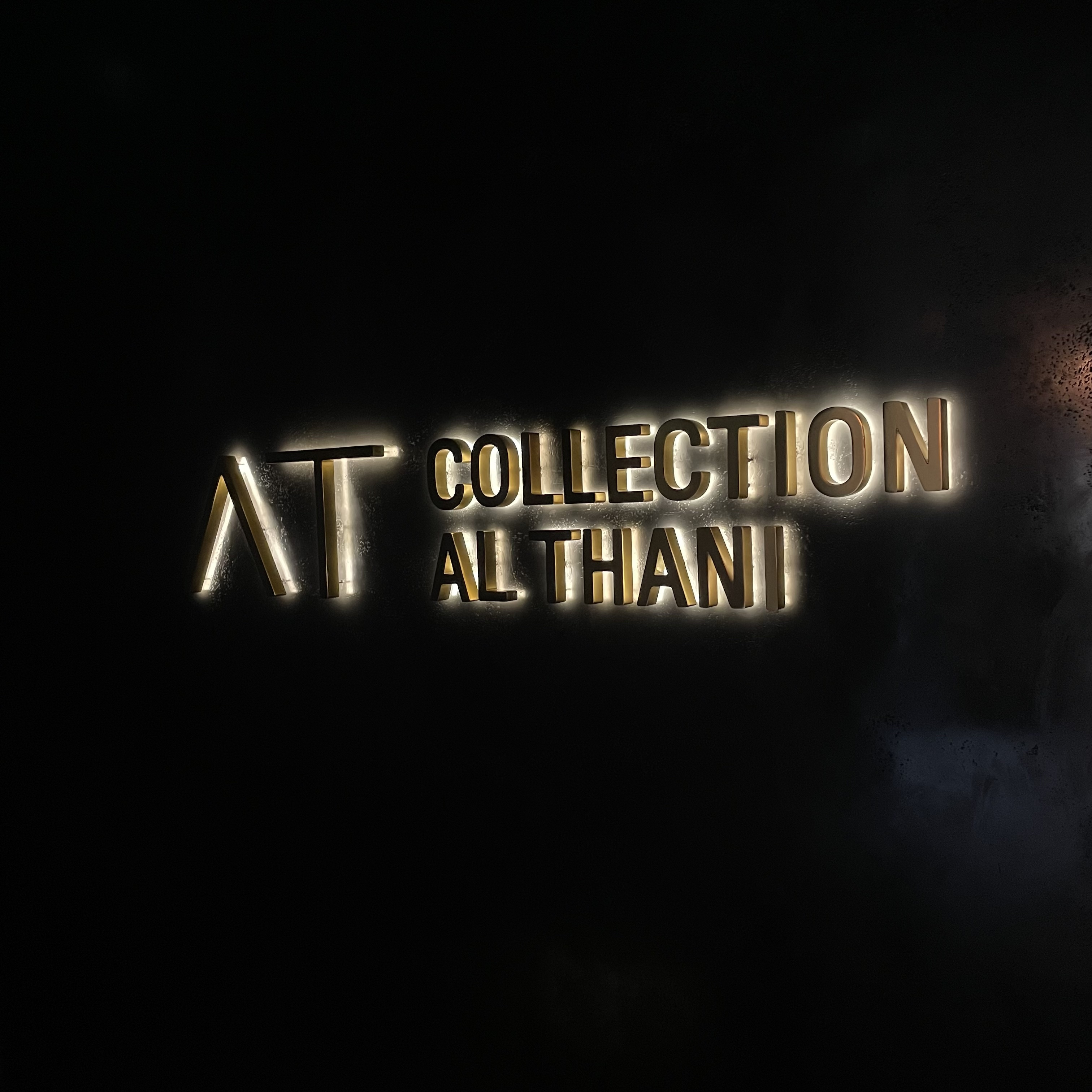
The Al Thani Collection at the Hôtel de la Marine in Paris

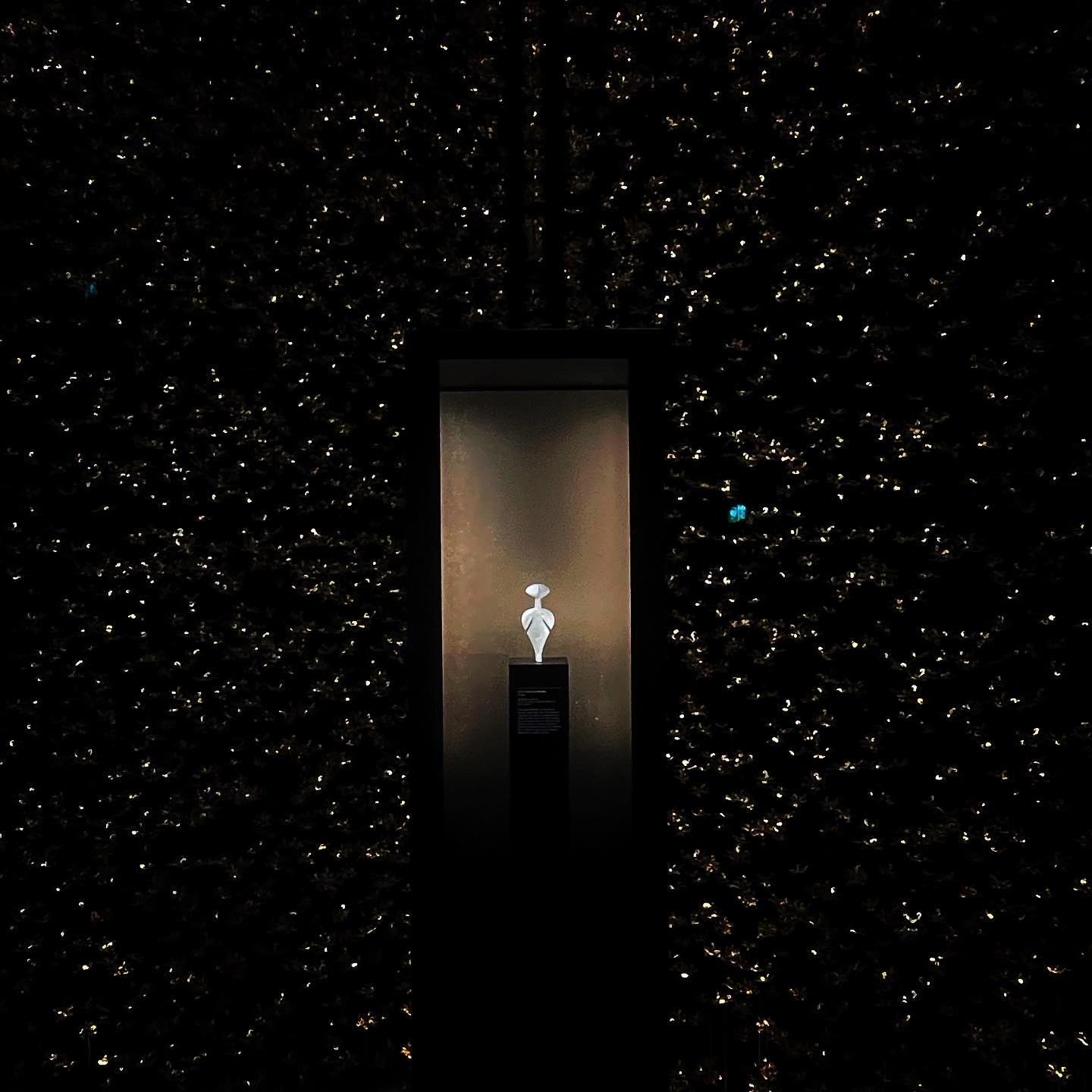
Gallery 1 at The Al Thani Collection at the Hôtel de la Marine in Paris

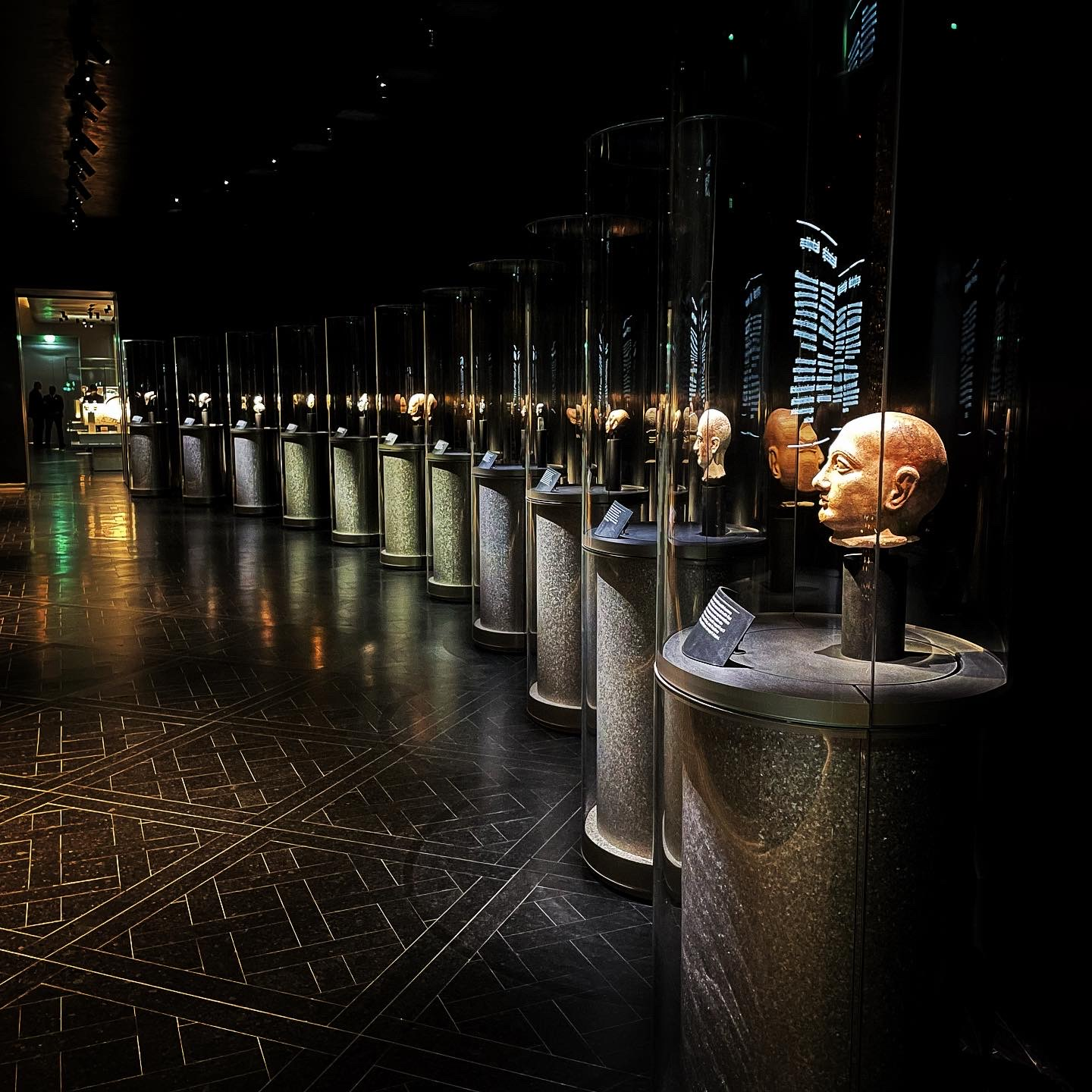
Gallery 2 at The Al Thani Collection at the Hôtel de la Marine in Paris

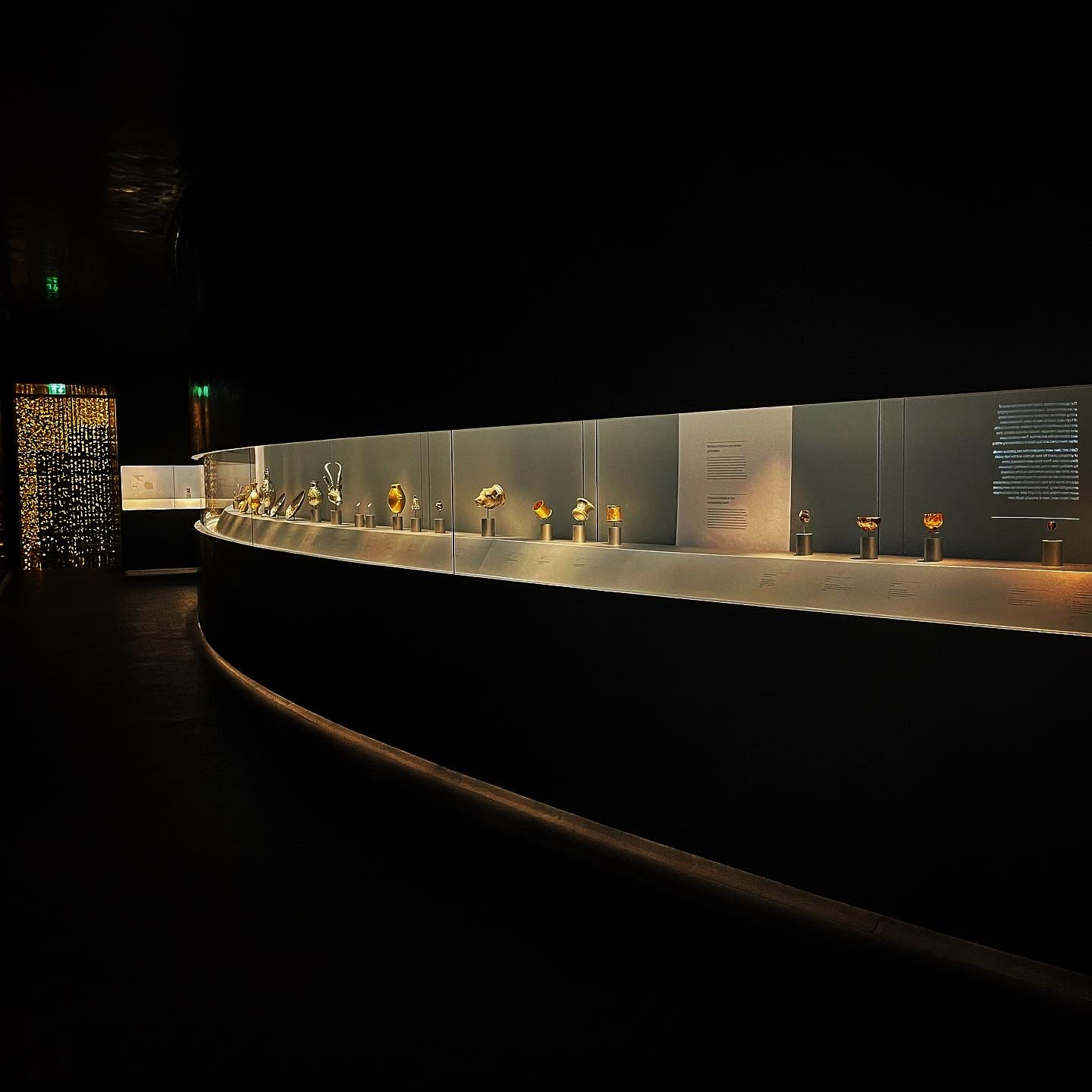
Gallery 4 at The Al Thani Collection at the Hôtel de la Marine in Paris

One notable object is the head of a royal figure is carved of red jasper, and depicting either Queen Hatshepsut or King Thutmosis III, from the 18th dynasty, a high point in Egyptian civilisation. It is believed to originally have had a crown of blue faience. The collection also contains a gold pendant from 4500-3500 BC, considered a notably early example of worked gold; a Mughal decorative bird made of gold, lacquer, rubies, and emeralds; A bear-shaped gilded bronze carpet weight from the Han Dynasty in China (202-220 AD; as well as sabres, textiles, and illuminated texts of the Koran.

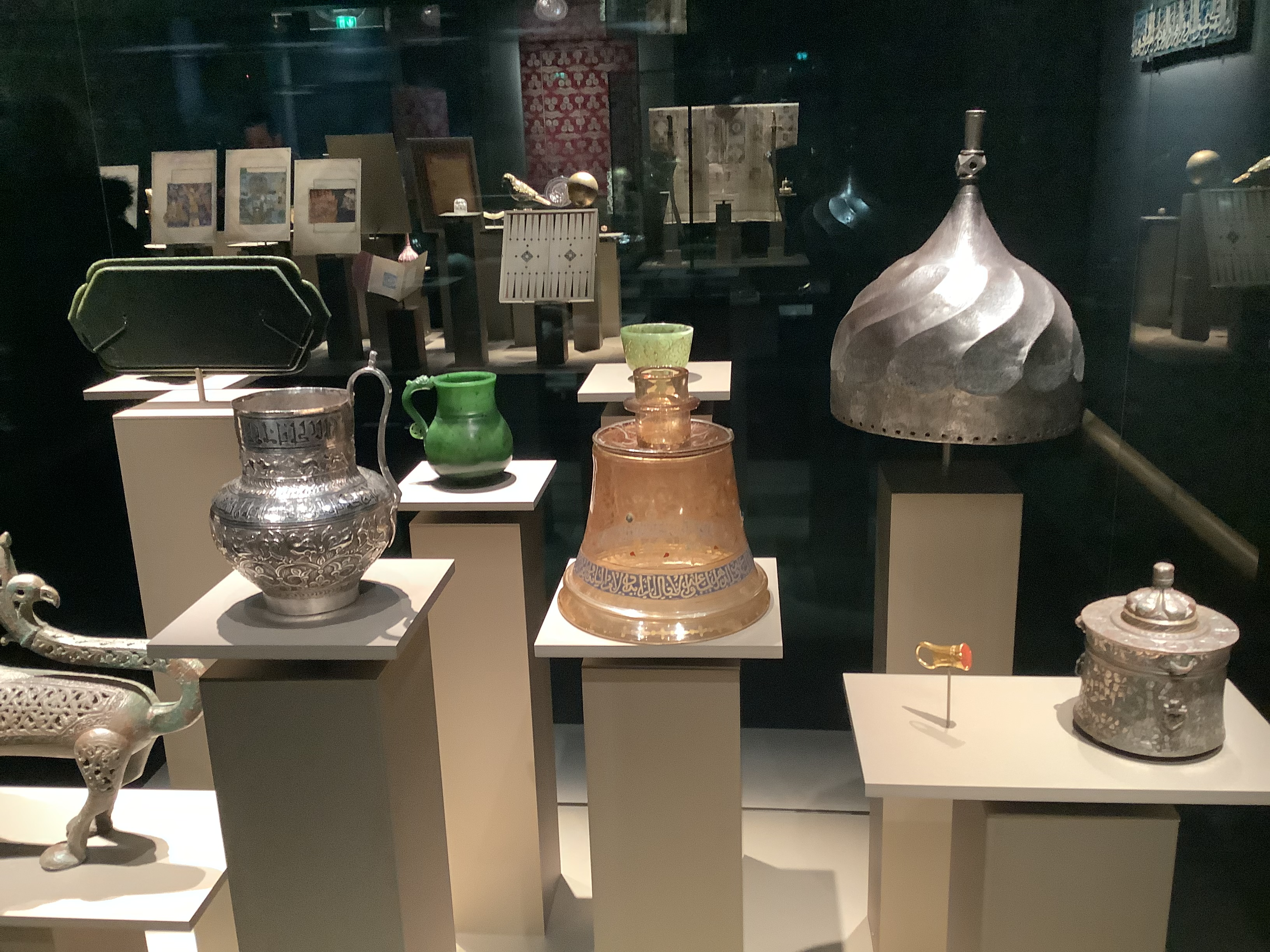
One gallery of the Al Thani Collection

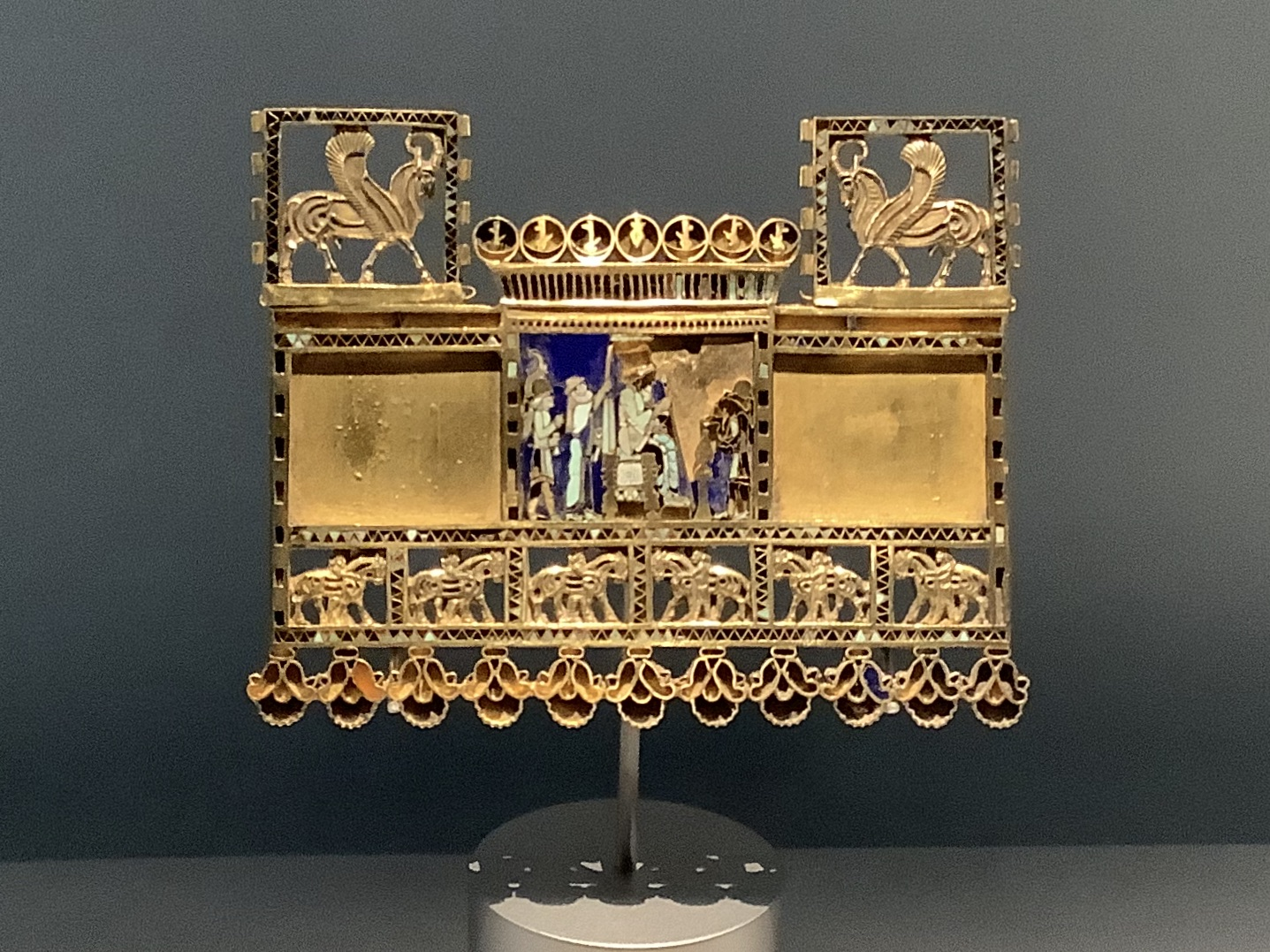
Achaemenid Empire plaque from Central Asia, of gold, lapis lazuli, coraline, turquoise, agate, and glass (400-300 BC)

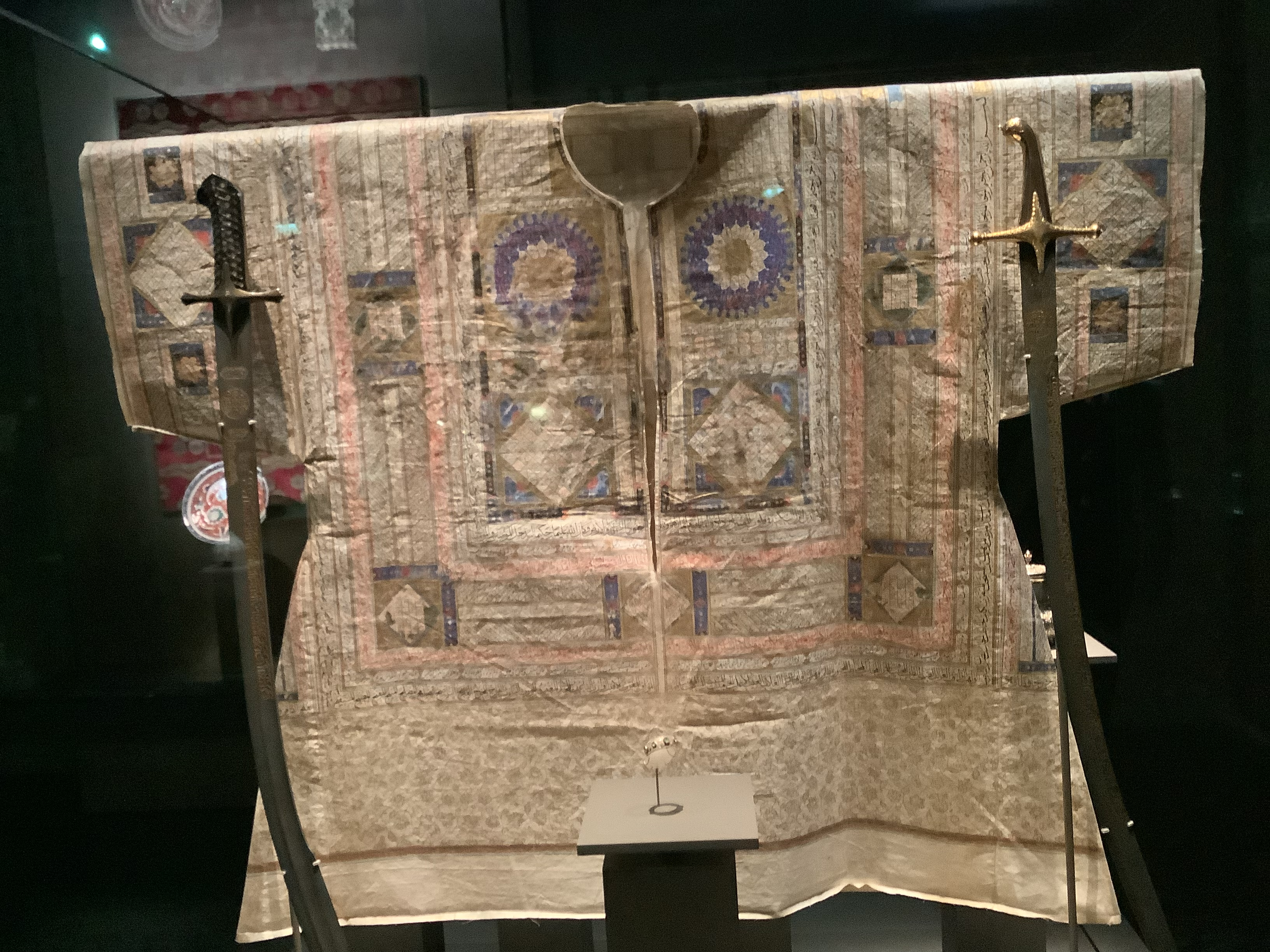
Ottoman Tunic with excerpts of Koran worn under armor, with two sabers (16th century)

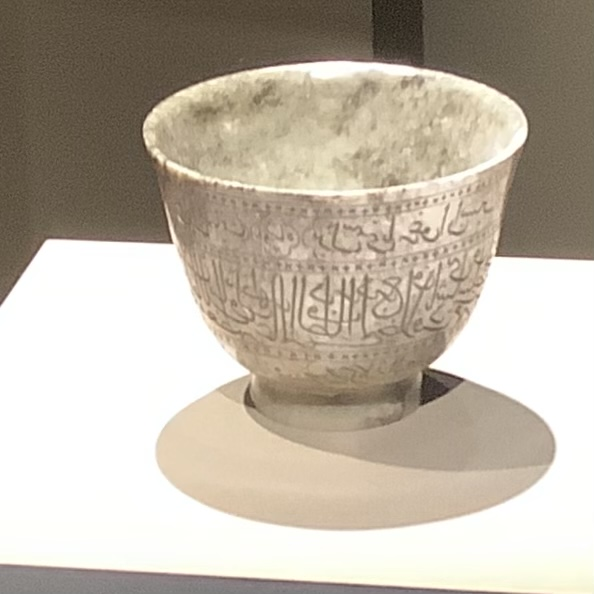
Jade wine cup of the Mughal Emperor Jahangir (1607-1608)

Another object on display is a 16th-century tunic covered with citations from the Koran, which was worn as protection against harm under a suit of armour. It is accompanied by two sabers, made of Damascus steel, which are marked with the name of the Emperor.

The collection displays a jade wine cup made for the fourth of the Mughal emperors, Jahangir in 1607-1608, the only known dated object specifically connected with an Emperor's name. The Persian text on the cup contains quotations from the Koran, and notes that it is the personal cup of the Emperor, with a date.

== Bibliography (in French) ==
- Pommereau, Claude, "Hôtel de la Marine" (June 2021), Beaux Arts Éditions, Paris (ISBN 979-10-204-0646-0)
- "Connaissance des arts" special edition, "L'Hôtel de la Marine", (in French), published September, 2021
