= Casa Verona =

- Born: Kasi Viranna
- Died: 1680
- Occupations: Merchant and *********

Casa Verona (died 1680), or Cassa Verona, is the Anglicized name of Kasi Viranna, an Indian merchant who served as the Chief Merchant of the Agency of Madras. He founded Cassa Verona & Co., the first Indian-owned joint stock company.

== Career ==
The earliest East India Company records of Casa Verona go back to 1665–70, during the Agency of Sir Edward Winter when he is mentioned as a partner of Beri Thimanna and took an active role as a chief purchasing agent, revenue farmer and choultry judge. in 1678, after Timmanna's death, Verona obtained a virtual monopoly over Madras trade after being granted personal right to pay half taxes on goods both in Madras and from the nawab of Golconda. During his career he was saluted with nine guns, and with 30 upon his death in 1680. He was on extremely friendly terms with agents Winter and later Sir William Langhorne, 1st Baronet.
