= Kollur Mine =

Diamond mine in India

Coordinates: 16°43′N 80°02′E

Location of Kollur Mine within India

The Kollur Mine was a series of gravel-clay pits on the south bank of the Krishna River in the state of Andhra Pradesh, India. It has produced many large diamonds, known as Golconda diamonds, several of which are or have been a part of crown jewels of various empires.

The mine was established in the early 17th century and operated until the mid-19th century.

== History ==
Kollur Mine was discovered around 1619 and was the first of 23 diamond mines to open in Golconda. William Methwold, an English merchant, visited the mine with Andries Soury of the Dutch East India Company during a trip to India in 1621. According to them, between 20,000 and 30,000 people worked at the mine and "jewelers of all the neighbouring nations resorted to the place" following news of its discovery, which had caused a notable fall in diamond prices. Golconda mines were owned by the local king, who leased operation to diamond merchants, either foreigners or Indians of the goldsmith caste. As well as rent, the king received 2% from sales and was entitled to keep all diamonds weighing over 10 carats.

One of the largest and most productive diamond mines on the Indian subcontinent, it continued operating until the mid-19th century. At the height of production, up to 60,000 men, women, and children performed various jobs. Kollur had a population of around 100,000. Mining was crude, labour-intensive, and dangerous. Miners wore loincloths, slept in huts covered with straw, and were often given food in lieu of money for wages. The pit walls, with no timber supports, were prone to caving in after heavy rains, killing dozens of men at a time (women and children worked on the surface).

Evacuated in the 2000s to make way for the Pulichinthala irrigation project, the area is submerged by 50 feet (15 m) of water for most of the year.

== Geology ==
The gravel-clay pits were a maximum depth of 4 metres (13 ft) due to the high water table. The diamond-bearing seam was approximately 1 foot (30 cm) thick. Alluvial workings covered an area 1.5 kilometres (0.93 mi) long and between 500 metres (0.31 mi) and 800 metres (0.50 mi) wide. It was bounded to the east by an outcrop of the Nallamala Hills and to the north and west by a meander of the Krishna River. Most of the pits have since been filled up with scree, boulders, and eluvium from neighbouring hillsides.

== Notable finds ==
The Tavernier Blue diamond was purchased by Jean-Baptiste Tavernier from the Kollur Mine in the mid-17th century. King Louis XIV of France bought the diamond from Tavernier, but it was stolen during the French Revolution; it reappeared and has been re-cut as the Hope Diamond. Other diamonds thought to have originated at Kollur include the Koh-i-Noor, the Great Mogul, the Wittelsbach-Graff, the Regent, the Daria-i-Noor, the Orlov, the Nizam, the Dresden Green, and the Nassak.

== Location and maps ==
Kollur Mine's location on the south bank of the Krishna River is indicated at latitude 16° 42' 30" N and longitude 80° 5' E on several 17th- and 18th-century maps. All memory of its position was lost until it was rediscovered in the 1880s by Valentine Ball, an Irish geologist, who helped to create a map (below) of Golconda diamond mines, published in A Manual of the Geology of India. In his annotated English edition of the French gem merchant Jean-Baptiste Tavernier's book Travels in India (1676), Ball notes that ruins of houses and mine workings could still be found at Kollur.

In the 1960s, Kollur Mine was pinpointed more accurately as being 1.5 kilometres (0.93 mi) due north-east of Kollur village, (Note: Not to be confused with Kollur, Guntur district.) on the south bank of River Krishna at latitude 16° 43' N and longitude 80° 02' E, and extending for 1.5 kilometres (0.93 mi) up to Pulichinthala.

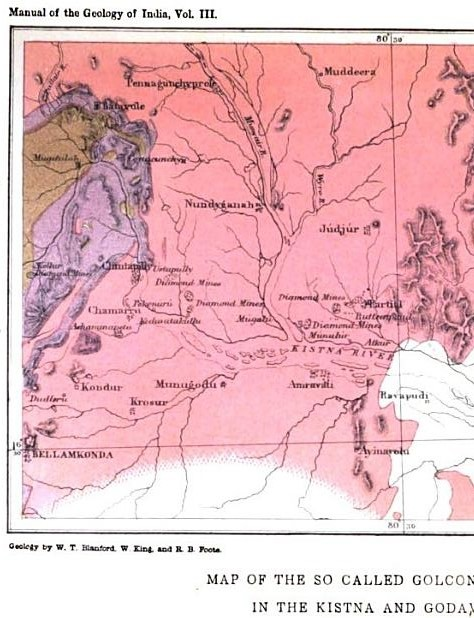
Golconda diamond mines map (left) with locations of mines

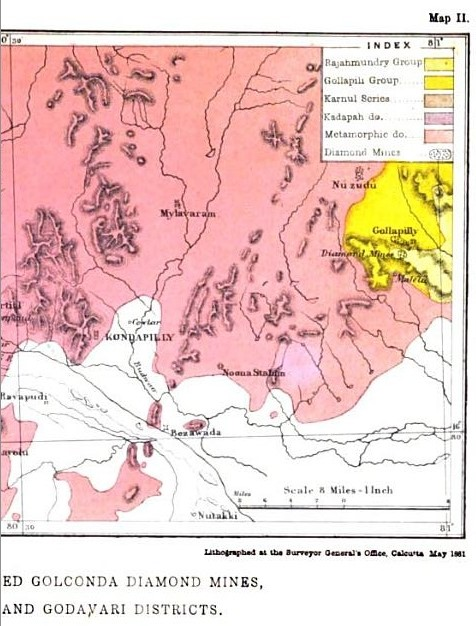
Golconda diamond mines map (right) with map key

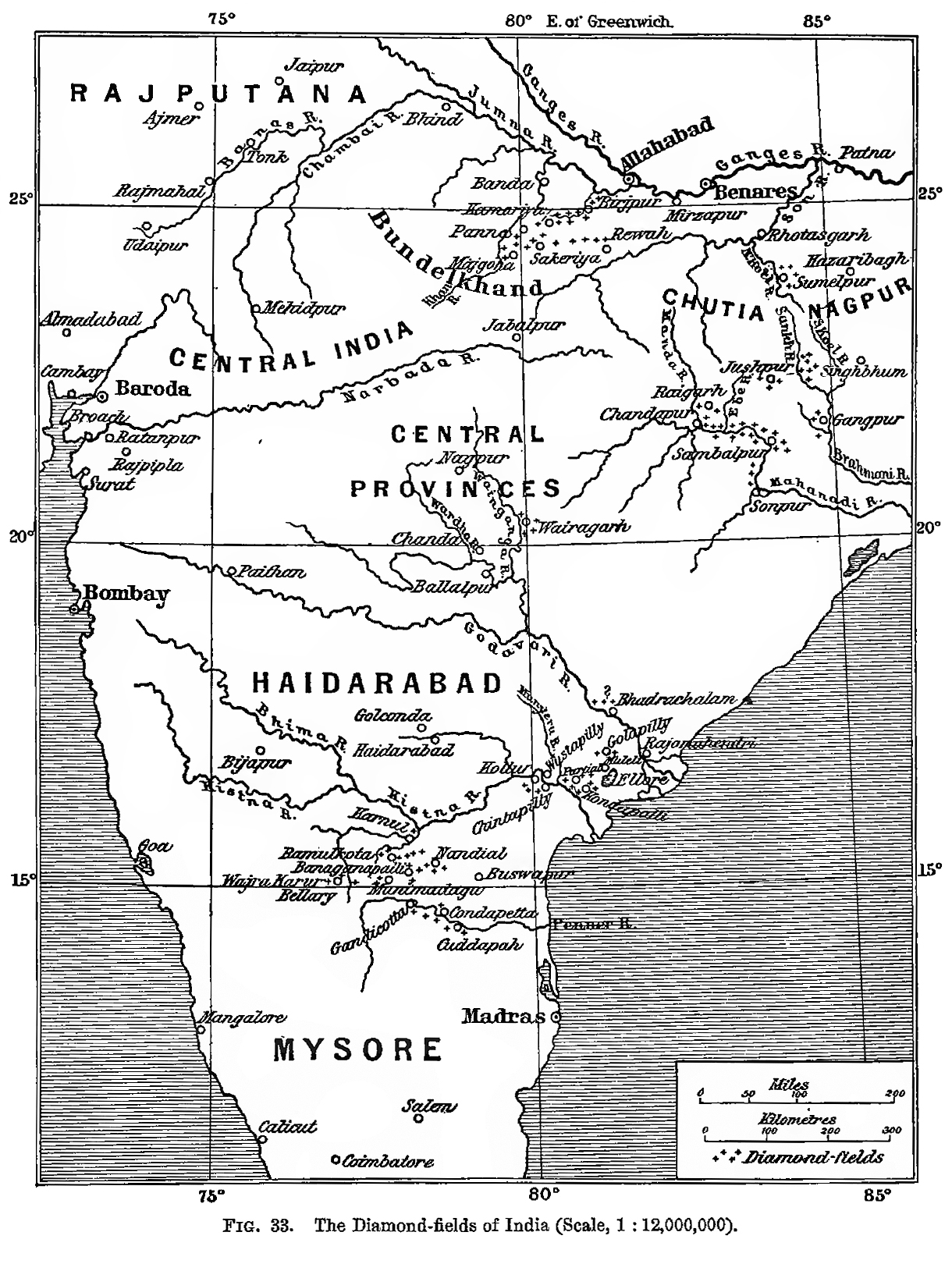
Map of diamond fields in India, published 1904

== See also ==
- Golconda Diamonds
- Placer mining
