= Daria-i-Noor (Dhaka) =

Historic diamond of Dhaka Nawab Family

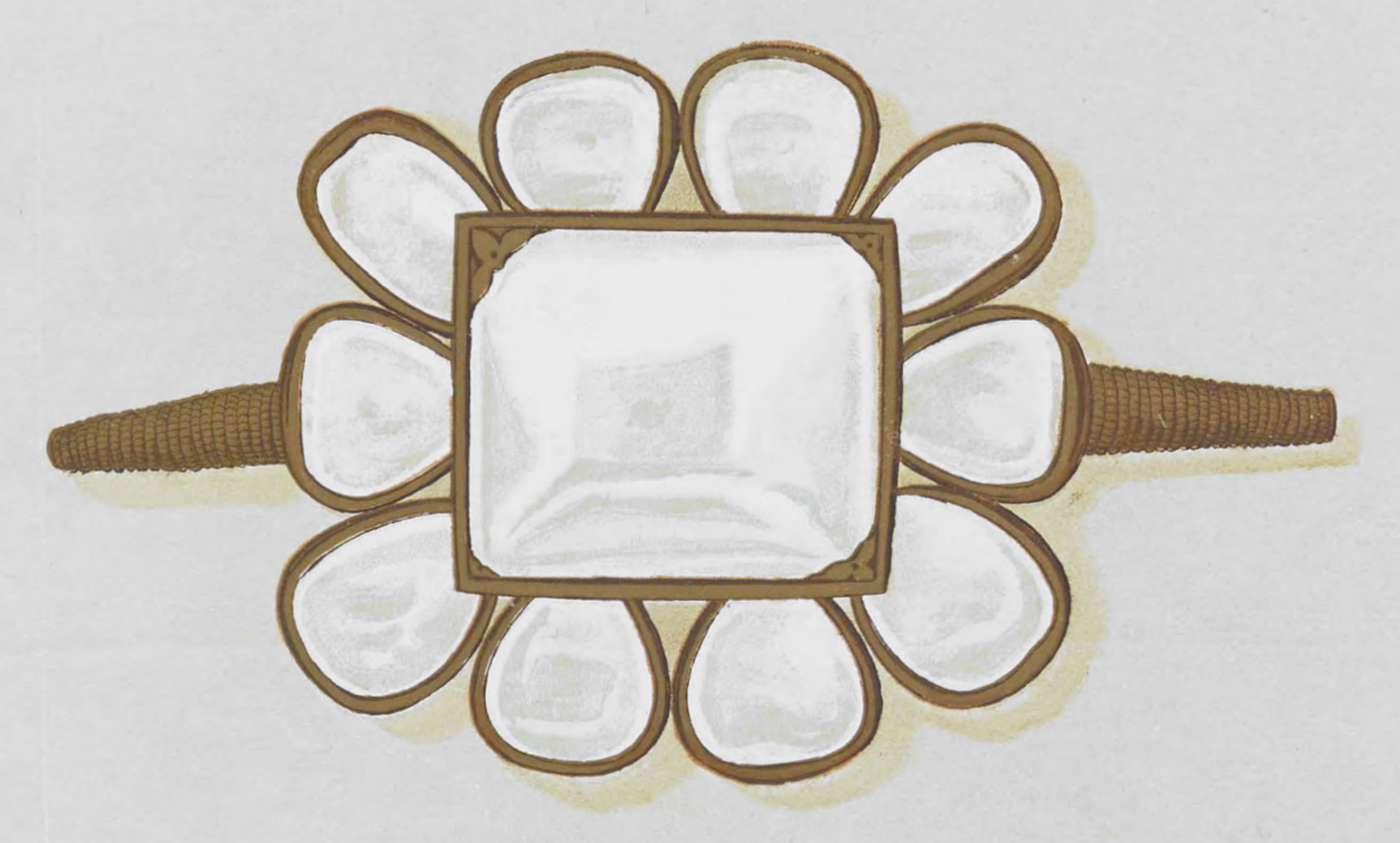
- Daria-i-Noor, illustrated by Hamilton & Company, c. 1906

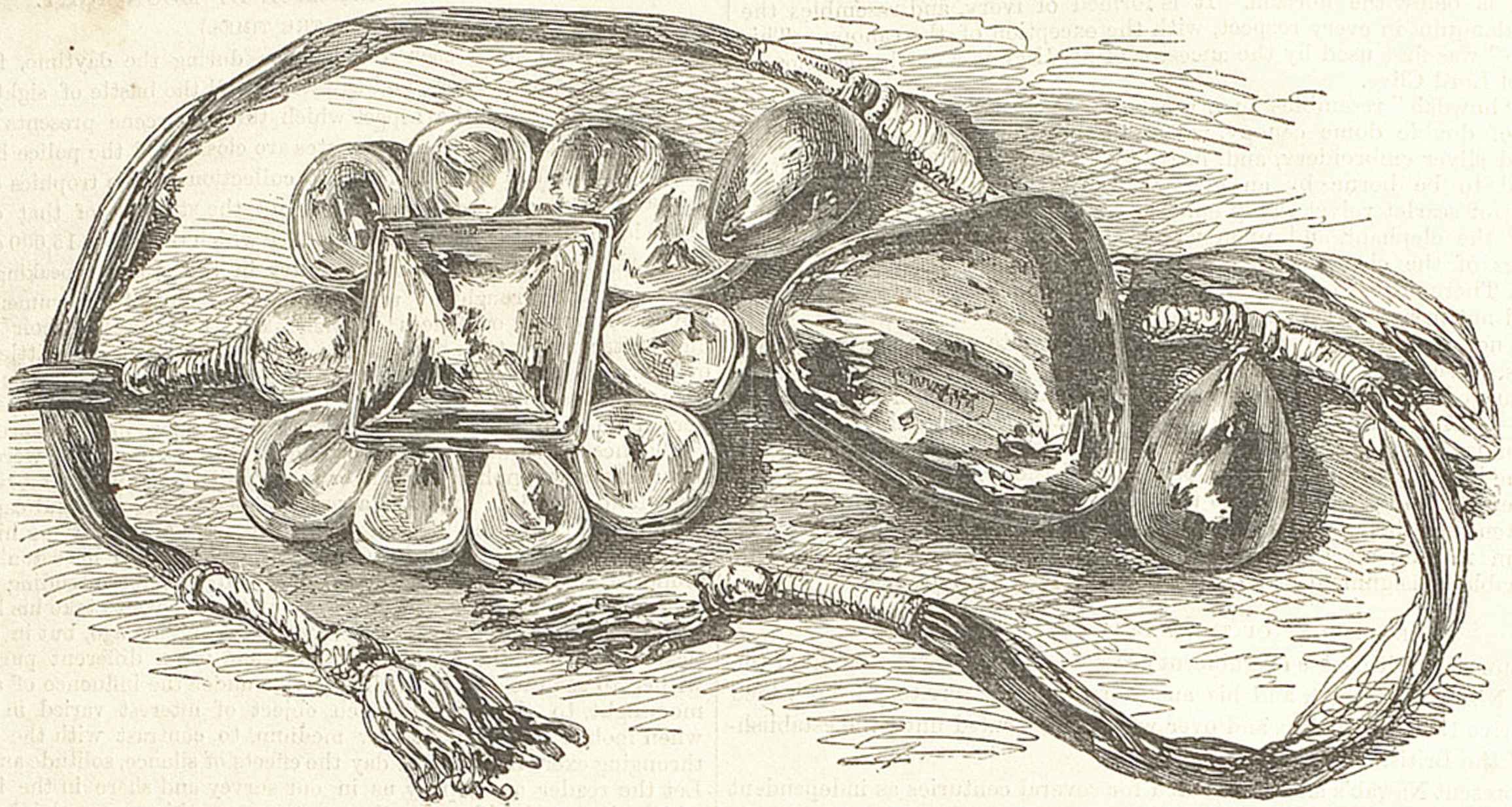
- The Daria-i-Noor as shown at the 1851 Great Exhibition, illustrated in The Crystal Palace and its Contents (1851), page 68
- Type of stone: Diamond
- Weight: 26 carats (5.2 g)
- Color: Nearly colorless
- Cut: Table cut
- Country of origin: Sultanate of Golconda
- Mine of origin: Kollur Mine
- Original owner: Nawabs of Dhaka
- Owner: Disputed: Dhaka Nawab Estate under Government of Bangladesh or the Nawab family of Dhaka
- Current location: 23°43′35″N 90°25′16″E; Sonali Bank, Motijheel, Dhaka
- Estimated value: 2025 equivalent (amount to Tk 1,320-1,848 crore if the average annual inflation rate is 4.5–5% over 117 years.) per 1908 estimation

The Daria-i-Noor (Persian: دریای نور, romanized: Daryā-i Nūr, Bengali: দরিয়া-ই-নূর, romanized: Dōriẏa-i-Nur, lit. 'Sea of Light' or 'Ocean of Light') is a 26-carat, table-cut clear diamond that is believed to be kept in the vault of Sonali Bank in Dhaka, the capital of Bangladesh. Mined from the Kollur mines in South India, the stone is the largest and most valuable diamond recorded in present-day Bangladesh and part of the heritage of the Nawab family of Dhaka. Historically it has often been regarded as a sibling of the Koh-i-Noor. Given in the Middle Ages in imitation of Persia’s famed Darya-ye Noor diamond, the name of the diamond has contributed to historical confusion surrounding its identity.

== Etymology and namesakes ==
In classical Persian, daryā (دریا) means "sea" or "large river" and nūr (نور) means "light". Together Daria-i-Noor (Persian: دریای نور) literally translates as "Sea of Light".

Historically, two of the world’s most famous and highly valued diamonds have been the Koh-i-Noor and the Darya-ye-Noor. In the Middle Ages, these names served as symbols of royal wealth and authority. Mughal and later Muslim rulers frequently gave prized diamonds in their possession names in imitation of those two to increase their perceived value and prestige. As a result, multiple distinct stones came to share the same names and frequently led to confusion in their histories. While the Koh-i-Noor is well known, during the period it was in Ranjit Singh's possession, a separate 26-carat table-cut diamond long kept in Dhaka was also given the name Daria-i-Noor by him apparently to advertise ownership of two of the world’s most valuable diamonds. In total, four distinct diamonds are documented to have been called Daria-i-Noor at various times.

=== Persian Darya-ye Noor ===
The largest and most historically famous of these is a 182-carat, table-cut pink diamond. It was seized from the Mughals by Nader Shah during his 1739 sack of Delhi, later formed part of the Iranian National Jewels, and is presently held in the vaults of the Central Bank of Iran.

=== Other disputed "Daria-i-Noor" stones ===
Historical records also mention other stones marketed or offered under similar names:

- In May 1922, an Afghan princess, Fatima, put a diamond called "Dara-gai-Noor" up for auction in New York and promoted it as the world's second largest diamond.
- In 1763, a table-cut diamond shown in Amsterdam was referred to as "Debiary-Noori" in De Hollandsche Mercurius monthly paper; some researchers believe this was actually the Shah Jahan Diamond marketed in Europe under the name "Daria-Noor".

== Description ==
Daria-i-Noor is the largest and most valuable diamond in Bangladesh. It is a first-class, 26-carat, table-cut almost colorless diamond of very high clarity, cut in a rectangular form with a flat table and a beveled girdle. The stone was mounted in a gold bajuband (armlet) surrounded by ten oval diamonds of about 5 carats each, giving a total weight of approximately 76 carats.

The diamond was set into an enameled gold mounting and was reported to have ten pearls attached (11 according to John Login). The cutting and the style of setting are judged unsophisticated, but the gem’s size and clarity make it extremely valuable. Depictions of the stone appear in a hand-painted plate preserved at Ahsan Manzil and in the collection of gemologist John Sinkankas as well.

=== Brassard ===
Original brassard that accompanied the Daria-i-Noor has no definitive surviving information. A near-identical armlet is preserved at the National Museum of Scotland (Image). In place of a diamond, the gem position there holds crystal quartz, the mount is pure silver, and the back shows red, green and blue Jaipur enamel engraving on gold. The armlet retains a maroon-coloured silk suspension similar to the Koh-i-Noor's mount. It was included in the 2014 exhibition of Maharaja Duleep Singh's jewels.

According to the museum, the armlet entered its collection from the squadron commander of 7th Bengal Cavalry Major-General Lindsey Carnegie’s holdings; Carnegie purchased it in 1898 from Prince Victor Singh, eldest son of Maharaja Duleep Singh. After Carnegie’s death in 1911 the armlet, together with other jewels from his collection, was donated to the museum.

== History ==
=== Origin and pre-British ownership ===
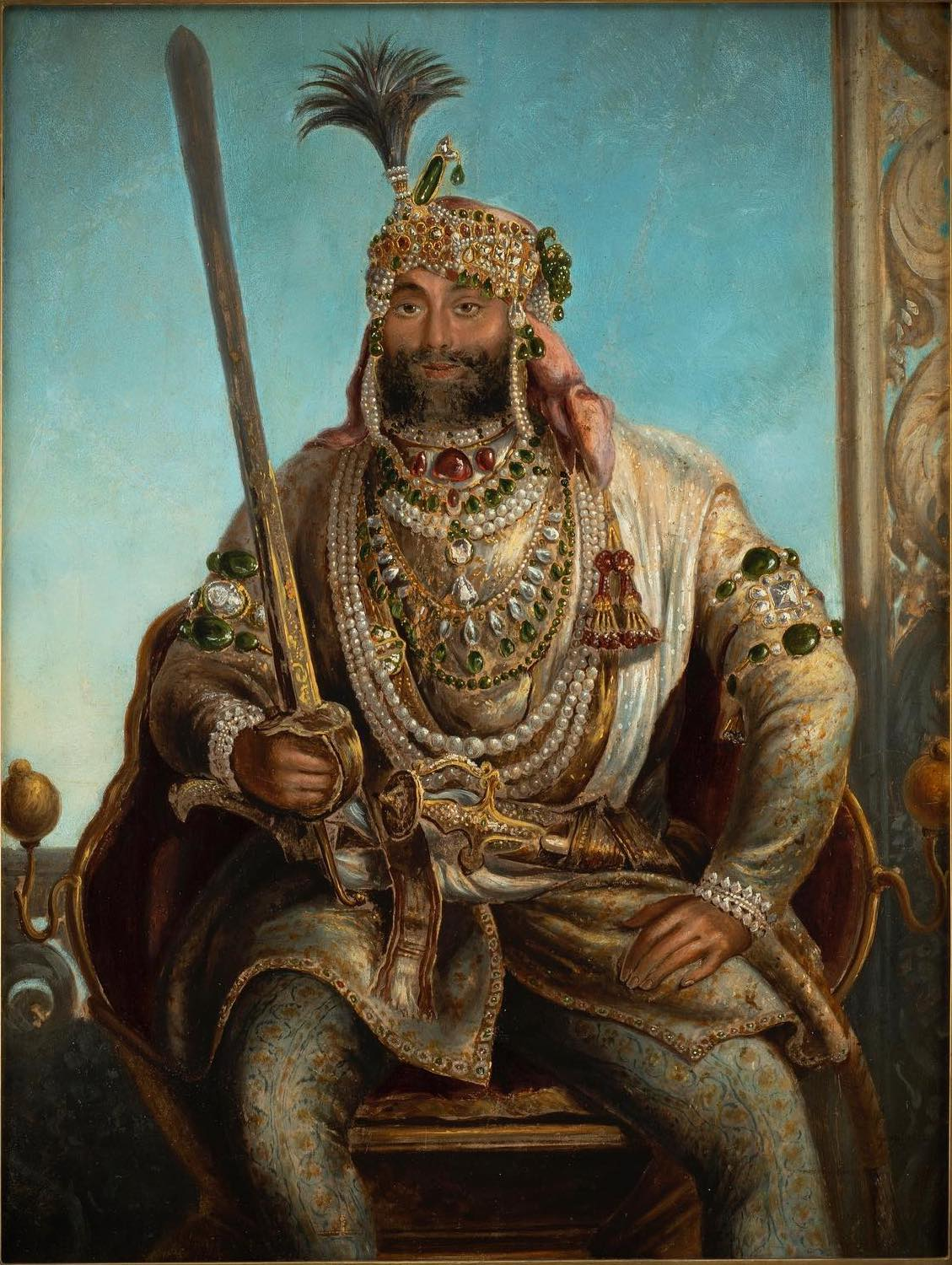
Painting of Maharaja Sher Singh by August Schoefft c. 1841–42. The Daria-i-Noor is depicted on his left upper arm

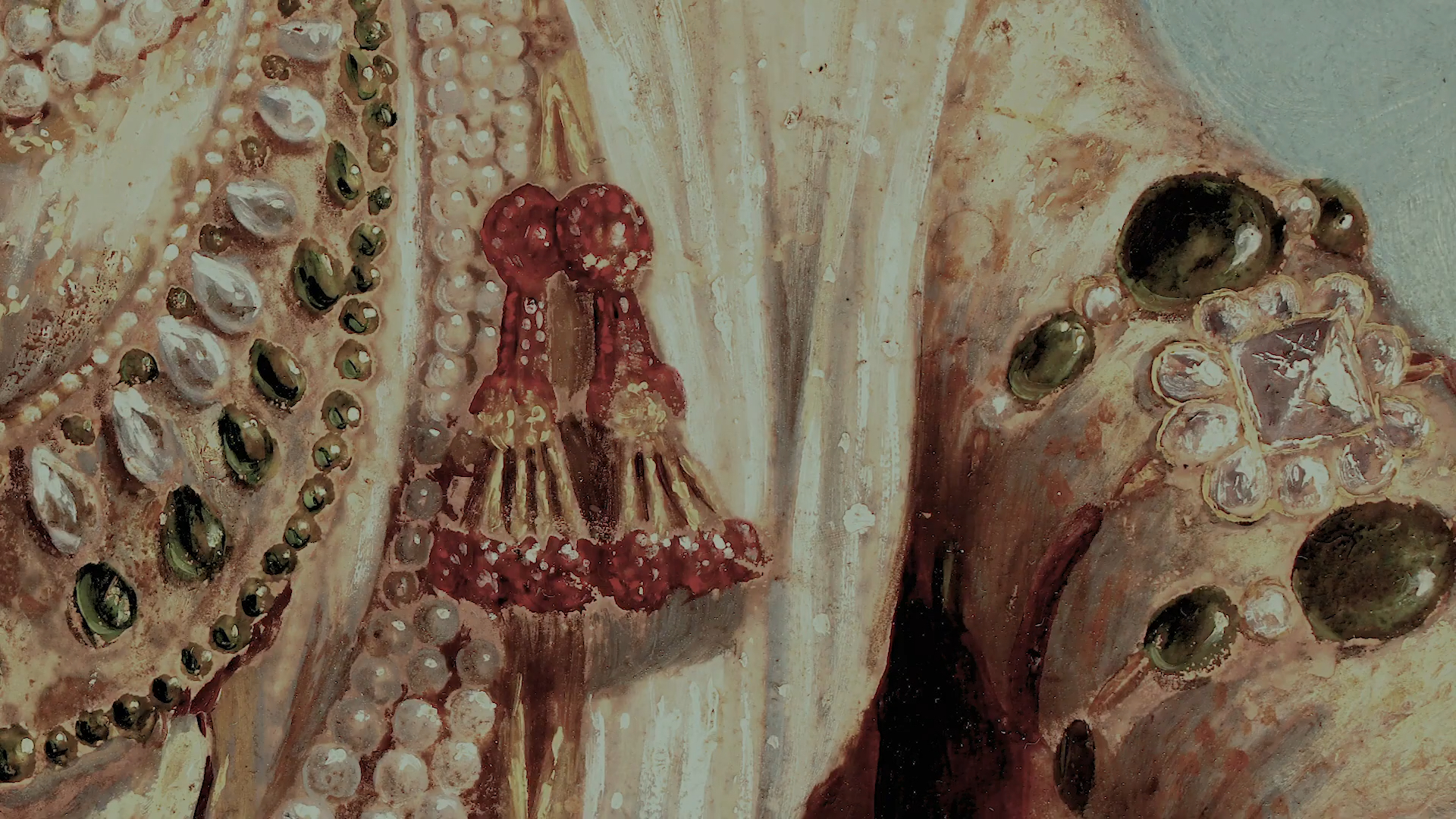
Daria-i-Noor Diamond of the left hand of Sher Singh by August Schoefft, c. 1841–42

The Daria-i-Noor, like the Koh-i-Noor, was mined from the Kollur Diamond mines in the Golconda region of southern India, then under the Kakatiya dynasty. According to contemporary accounts, it is believed that it remained for a long period under the possession of the Maratha rulers. It was later purchased for approximately ₹130,000 rupees by the family of Nawab Siraj-ul-Mulk, prime minister of Hyderabad State.

The diamond subsequently came into the possession of Maharaja Ranjit Singh in c. 1840–60, the first maharaja of the Sikh Empire in Punjab. He used both the Koh-i-Noor and the Daria-i-Noor as armlets (bajubands), mounted on enamelled gold. Ranjit Singh gave the diamond its name after the famous Persian stone Darya-ye Noor.

The earliest known depiction of the Daria-i-Noor was drawn in 1841 by the Hungarian artist August Schoefft. Between 1841 and 1843, during the brief reign of Ranjit Singh's son Sher Singh, Schoefft spent a year in Lahore producing numerous images of the Sikh Empire. His portrait of Sher Singh shows the Koh-i-Noor armlet on the right arm and the Daria-i-Noor armlet on the left, along with the necklace set with Timur Ruby.

Because of confusion with the Persian Darya-e noor, the diamond is sometimes erroneously described as having been in the possession of Nader Shah of Persia, although there is no substantive evidence for this claim.

=== British possession ===
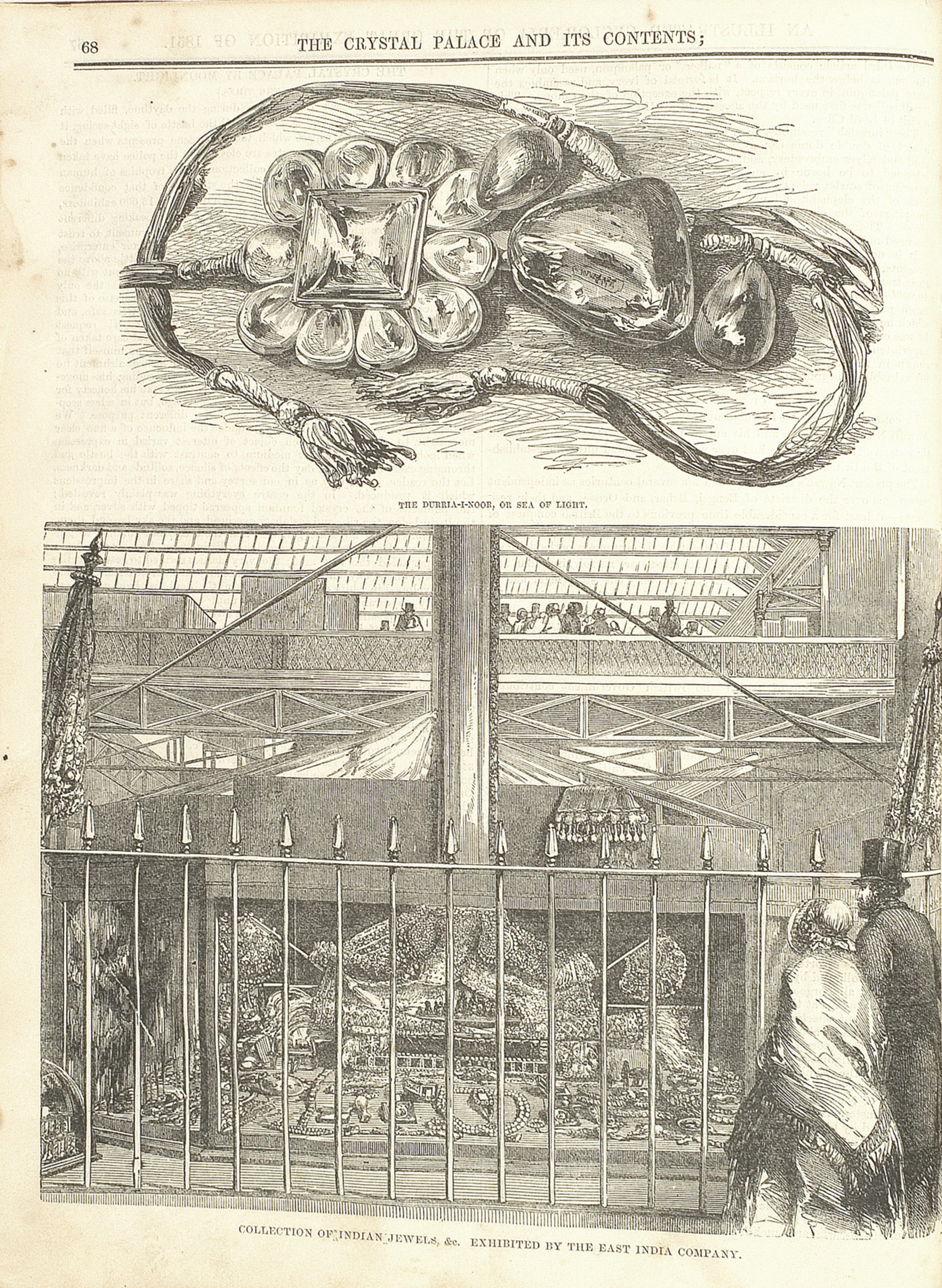
The Daria-i-Noor and its exhibition at the London Great Exhibition (illustration from The Crystal Palace and Its Contents, 1851)

In 1849 the East India Company consolidated control over Punjab and took possession of the treasures of the Lahore treasury from Ranjit Singh's youngest son and last boy-king of Punjab, Duleep Singh. Over the following three months, Dr. John Spencer Login, a Scottish surgeon of the Company’s army and later appointed guardian of Duleep Singh, catalogued each item of the Lahore Durbar’s toshakhana (royal treasury) and assessed their estimated values. According to his records at the time, the Daria-i-Noor weighed 10.8 tola (approximately 26 carats) and was valued at ₹63,000 rupee or £6,000 pound (equivalent to about £10 million pound today). He also noted that both the Koh-i-Noor and the Daria-i-Noor were mounted in armlets flanked by an additional eleven pearls and eleven rubies. Login transferred the treasury, along with his inventory, to Lord Dalhousie, from which the Lahore Durbar jewels subsequently became known as the "Dalhousie Collection".

On behalf of the underage Duleep Singh, under what has been described as a form of coercion, Dalhousie presented the Koh-i-Noor and the Daria-i-Noor to Queen Victoria as a tribute. According to George V, while the Queen retained the Koh-i-Noor, she returned the Daria-i-Noor to the Company, as she did not favour it.

==== Great Exhibition ====
At the Great Exhibition held in The Crystal Palace in London’s Hyde Park in 1851, the Koh-i-Noor was exhibited on behalf of Queen Victoria and the Daria-i-Noor on behalf of the East India Company. The exhibition showcased significant cultural artefacts and new technologies from British colonies and other nations. Indian jewels and treasures formed a major part of this display. On 31 May 1851, The Illustrated London News published a special article describing these gems in detail. Owing to the known existence of the original Persian Darya-ye Noor, contemporary newspapers referred to the exhibited stone as the "so-called" Daria-i-Noor and criticised its cut. A depiction of the diamond was included in The Crystal Palace and Its Contents (1851), where it was described as the famous "Lahore Diamond".

After the exhibition, the Koh-i-Noor remained with the British royal family. However, as the Daria-i-Noor did not fetch the anticipated price, it was sent back to India to be auctioned. With the approval of the British government, Hamilton & Co. of Calcutta organised its sale in November 1852.

=== Nawabi ownership ===
In November 1852, Khwaja Alimullah, the founder of Dhaka nawab family, purchased the Daria-i-Noor diamond at an auction organized by Hamilton & Co. in Kolkata for about ₹75,000 rupee. Subsequently, the Nawab family used the diamond as an armlet ornament and occasionally as a turban ornament. A family record describes it as a central jewel in a multi-stone mount of the family’s heraldic armlet.

In 1887, Viceroy Lord Dufferin and Lady Dufferin saw the diamond at the Nawab’s residence in Ballygunge, Kolkata. Lady Dufferin noted in her book Our Viceregal Life in India that, owing to its flat shape, the diamond did not seem particularly attractive to them.

Between 1841 and 1901 an album of gemstones collected by the Nawab family was published under the name "Dacca Collection" with the assistance of Hamilton & Co., in which the Daria-i-Noor was prominently featured.

In 1908, Nawab Khwaja Salimullah pledged the Daria-i-Noor to the government as collateral for a loan.

=== As collateral ===
Around 1907, Nawab Salimullah fell into severe financial difficulties due to heavy philanthropic public service and political activities costing nearly ₹3.7 million rupee. He mortgaged Nawab Estate lands and properties and borrowed ₹1.4 million rupee from a Marwari and a Hindu moneylender. On 5 September 1907, at Salimullah’s request, the Court of Wards acting for the Government of Eastern Bengal and Assam formally declared him unfit to manage the zamindari and took over all Nawab Estate properties.

To repay various debts, on 6 August 1908 Salimullah obtained a ₹1.4 million rupee loan from the Court of Wards under the Board of Revenue at 3 percent interest, repayable over 30 years. Under nine conditions, he mortgaged all his movable and immovable property, including the Daria-i-Noor, to the Court of Wards. At that time the diamond’s value was assessed at ₹500,000 rupee. In 1911 he sent the diamond to England for auction. However it was not sold as the highest bid was only £1,500 pounds.

In January 1912, during the visit of King George V and Queen Mary of Teck to India, the diamond was presented in front of them in Kolkata. King George V was already familiar with the stone. Thereafter it remained in the custody of trusted jewellers to the British royal family in Kolkata Hamilton & Co. until 1948.

After independence the Board of Revenue was abolished. In 1989 a new Land Reform Board was established by ordinance, which assumed responsibility for the Nawab Estate’s administration. Following the creation of Pakistan in 1947, the diamond was moved from Kolkata to the Dhaka branch of the Imperial Bank of India. It later passed to the State Bank of Pakistan and is now stored in the vault of Sonali Bank.

Although most of the debts had been repaid by 1937, the some loans and interest incurred by the Nawab remain outstanding.

== Recent history and current custody ==
The diamond is currently in custody of Dhaka Nawab Estate under Court of Wards under Land Reform Board under Ministry of Land of Government of Bangladesh as collateral from Dhaka nawab family and in storage of Motijheel branch of Sonali Bank.

Since the diamond was placed in a vault in 1908, debate has persisted over whether the stone was lost following the Partition of India (1947) and the Bangladesh Liberation War (1971), or whether it has remained intact in storage. Although the Daria-i-Noor was reportedly inspected on eight occasions in 1954, 1956, 1970, 1974, 1975, 1983 and 1985, no detailed public reports have been preserved. In 1985 inspecting experts certified the stone as authentic; some accounts, however, state that only the box containing it was confirmed that year.

On 3 May 2003, the Ministry of Land formed a committee to inspect mortgaged properties of the Nawab Estate. No records of the committee’s activities are preserved. According to files from the Land Reform Board, the Minister of Land Rezaul Karim Hira, together with committee members, examined a sealed iron box wrapped in cloth in the office of the managing director of Sonali Bank on 21 June 2011. However the seal was not broken and the diamond and other valuables inside were not reviewed. On 23 March 2016, during a meeting of the parliamentary committee on the Ministry of Land, frustration was expressed by the committee and a decision was taken under the leadership of Minister Shamsur Rahman Sherif to carry out an inspection, but the recommendation was never implemented.

In 2017, rumours circulated that the diamond had been lost.

According to records of Land Reform Board, the Dhaka Nawab Estate maintained a safe-deposit at Sadarghat branch of Sonali Bank containing a sealed packet marked “Daria-i-Noor.” For security reasons the packet was moved in July 2011 from that branch to the bank’s local office at Motijheel. It is now generally believed to be stored in a vault of Sonali Bank. Bank authorities state that the vault remains sealed and has not been officially opened.

Former Director General of the Bangladesh National Museum Faizul Latif Chowdhury has stated that if no irregularities occurred during the various transfers, the diamond is still safely in the vault. Because of concerns within the Ministry of Land over the overall security of the treasury and potential liability in case of loss, the stone has not been brought to the museum for exhibition.

In September 2025 interim government of Bangladesh decided to formally open the sealed packets containing the Nawab family's 109 pieces of jewellery, including the Daria-i-Noor. Prior to this, on 26 May 2025, the Ministry of Land had established an 11-member committee tasked with inventorying the gemstones and overseeing the preservation of the Dhaka Nawab Estate's tangible assets. The committee intended to submit a report regarding the preservation of the artifacts to Chief Adviser Muhammad Yunus following the verification of the inventory. The vault containing the Daria-i-Noor was scheduled to be opened on 11 October. A six-member subcommittee conducted a procedural rehearsal at Sonali Bank on 5 October, and plans were made to broadcast the event live on Bangladesh Television (BTV) to ensure transparency. However, on 9 October, the Land Reform Board announced the indefinite suspension of the operation without citing a specific reason. Sheikh Abdur Rashid, the Cabinet Secretary and chair of the verification committee, later stated that the postponement was due to the absence of several members who were outside Dhaka, adding that a new date would be determined at the committee's next meeting. As of December 2025, no further update is given.

At present the Daria-i-Noor is considered to be held in a vault at Sonali Bank's Motijheel branch. Although repeated attempts have been made to display the stone at the Bangladesh National Museum, this has not yet been possible, and public calls for its exhibition have intensified.

== Value and appraisal ==
According to records of the Land Reform Board, in 1908 the value of these 109 pieces of jewellery was assessed at ₹1,009,835 rupee, of which the Daria-i-Noor alone was valued at ₹500,000 rupee. In the original court documents the diamond’s price is cited as ₹500,000 rupee in 1908; according to AFP this could correspond to a present-day market value of roughly US$13 million or more and over ৳1.6 billion Bangladeshi taka.

Other notable items listed include: a diamond star set with 96 pearls once owned by a French empress Eugénie de Montijo (₹96,000); a carved-emerald and diamond armlet (₹50,000); the ruby and diamond-set women’s head ornament “Rose of Corsica” (₹48,000); a fez adorned with hanging pearls and diamonds (₹34,000); a gold belt set with emeralds and diamonds (₹28,000); and a turban ornament of diamonds and emeralds (₹25,000). The inventory also mentioned rings, necklaces, bangles, a diamond-studded sword, assorted gemstones, and a miniature mandolin priced at only ₹5. Most of the items were crafted with either diamonds or emeralds.

== Ownership ==
In 1907, the Dhaka Nawab Estate was placed under the Court of Wards, and in 1951 it was abolished under the East Bengal State Acquisition and Tenancy Act of 1950 (zamindari abolition act). In 1989 a new Land Reform Board was established by ordinance, which assumed responsibility for Court of Wards with Nawab Estate’s administration. However, Ahsan Manzil and certain other properties remained outside state acquisition. Because intra-family claims were never fully settled, some properties are still under the supervision of the Land Reform Board. Owing to debts left by Nawab Khwaja Salimullah, disputes over ownership of these properties persist.

Although descendants of the Nawab family claim ownership of the Daria-i-Noor and associated jewels, the government and the Court of Wards maintain that, in the absence of evidence of debt repayment, these assets are state property. Consequently, the diamond’s actual ownership remains uncertain.

== Historicity and legend ==
Very little scholarly research has been conducted on the Daria-i-Noor leaving the history of the stone unclear.

Some regard the diamond as a "cursed jewel" comparable to the Koh-i-Noor. Folklore holds that the fall of Maharaja Ranjit Singh of Punjab and later the financial decline of the Dhaka Nawab family were linked to the stone’s curse. The diamond has thus been popularly associated with misfortune, including the collapse of the Sikh Empire and the bankruptcy of the Nawabi estate. These beliefs, however, lack historical evidence and are considered part of oral tradition and superstition rather than documented fact.

== See also ==
- Gemstone
- Diamond
- Koh-i-Noor
- Darya-ye Noor
- Shah Jahan Diamond
