= Three Gemstones =

It is short historical review of gemstones from Mughal empire

The Three Gemstones (Persian سه سنگ قیمتی), also known as Three Mughal precious stones, were a group of gemstones that were found in 17th century in Mughal Empire during Mughal–Maratha War. The largest gemstone from three of them, according to historical facts, could be around 3,000-6,000 carats, it could be the largest ruby or sapphire that has ever been found.

== Origin/History ==
There are version that gemstones were found near local river or mountains by miners/gemstone seekers, but since it was time of war, at first gemstones were kept in secrecy by local aristocratic family. Later it become property of Aurangzeb also known as Alamgir I who was the sixth Mughal emperor. Legend says that two gemstones were average size, but third was almost big as man’s fist, probably biggest gemstone found at that period in Mughal Empire. Emperor have ordered to reshape all gemstones in oval form so the big one could be later used as crown jewel but other two used for necklace. It is said that later all gemstones were confiscated or bought by East India Company in 19th century, just like legendary Koh-i-Noor diamond and Timur Ruby.

== Later owners-possibilities ==
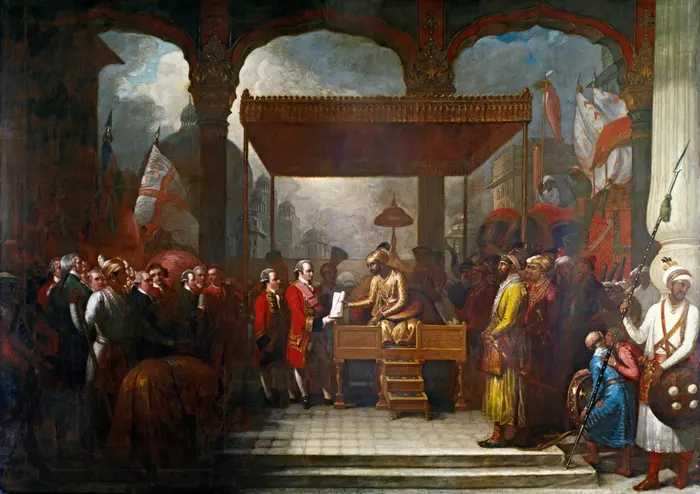
The Mughal Emperor Shah Alam hands the scroll to Robert Clive (EIC)

It is told that East India Company brought this large gemstone to England just like Koh-i-Noor, Timur’s ruby and other gemstones. After that none have information what happened to this gemstones, but there is some stories, that years after collapse of East India company, some previous members of East India Company have sold it, and as one potential candidate who could bought it from them could be Sir John Ellerman, 1st Baronet. It is well known that Sir John Ellerman was one of the richest men in the United Kingdom, and he was very private about his life and wealth. Another rumor reinforces the above theory, that in 1901 Sir John Ellerman sold to J.P.Morgan not only his business but also private gemstone collection. This could believable theory, because J.P.Morgan was well known gemstone collector and his collection even have been exhibited at the World’s Fair in Paris in 1889.

There is versions and huge possibility that later the biggest gemstone in 1980s-90s was sold in black market or in secrecy in Arabia peninsula, during the period of rise of Arab investment/financial world.

== Importance and Value ==
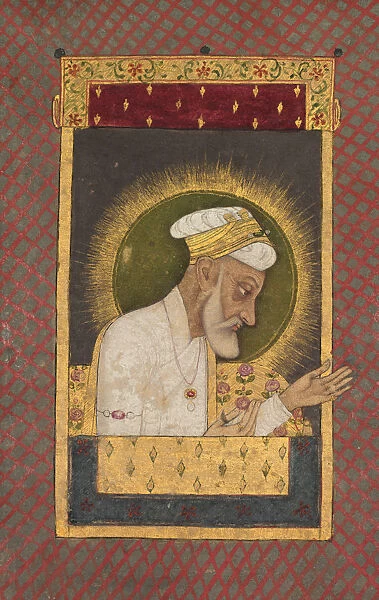
Mughal Emperor Alamgir I with ruby necklace, could be made from one of the small one gemstone from three.

Since largest gemstone was large size and not with regular form, it was cut and shaped by Mughals. It is told that two small gemstones were more red like rubies, but largest was only half red, more like red-pink, that why it was dyed to be red like real ruby.

Experts believe that they were sapphire or ruby. Largest gemstone carat weight could be from 3,000 to 6,000 carats, at that time and probably still now one of the largest ruby/sapphire found.

Since it is so large and it was owned by Mughal Emperors, later to other emperors and millionaires, it is believed that biggest gemstone current value could be 35 - 60 million USD. Small gemstones value with necklaces could be around 5-10 million USD. In photo is represented one of the small gemstone which was made into necklace.

All three gemstones were national treasures of the Mughal Empire, and today they have huge importance in Muslim world and history.
