= Spencer Login =

England international rugby union player

Rear-Admiral Spencer Login CVO
- Born: Spencer Henry Metcalfe Login; September 24, 1851; Futleghur, Punjab
- Died: January 22, 1909 (aged 57); Claygate, Surrey (aged 57 years 120 days)
- School: Wellington College

Rugby union career
- Position: Fullback
Senior career
Years	Team	Apps	(Points)
- Royal Naval College
International career
Years	Team	Apps	(Points)
1875	England	1	

Rear-Admiral Spencer Henry Metcalfe Login, CVO (24 September 1851 – 22 January 1909) was an officer of the Royal Navy and was also a rugby union international who represented England in 1875

== Life ==
Login was born on September 24, 1851, in Futtehghur, Punjab. He was the son of the celebrated naval surgeon Sir John Spencer Login, a native of Stromness, Orkney and Lena, Lady Login (nee Campbell), the Scottish courtier and author. Having attended Wellington College, he joined the Royal Navy and went on to the Royal Naval College, Greenwich.

== Career ==
Login was first enrolled into the Royal Navy aged 13 on 2 May 1865. As a sub-lieutenant he served in the Third Anglo-Ashanti War and was awarded the Ashanti Medal in 1874. He then attended the Royal Naval College and was promoted to the rank of Lieutenant on 31 March 1874. As a lieutenant he served on the HMS Sphinx in North Africa and was awarded the Soudan Medal (with clasps: "THE NILE 1884-85", "ABU KLEA" (1885), "KIRKEBAN" (1885), "SUAKIN 1885", and "TOFREK" (1885)) and Khedive's Egyptian Star. He was later promoted to the rank of Commander on 30 June 1888. When he was promoted to the rank of Captain on 1 January 1895, he was subsequently appointed captain of the battleship HMS Centurion in March of that year. He was later appointed in command of the battleship Repulse in September, 1900.

Whilst maintaining the rank of captain, Login carried the functional position of Commodore and was appointed an aide-de-camp to the King. He married Mary Lavinia Anderson (nee Griffin) on 10 April 1905. Login was later that year appointed a Commander of the Royal Victorian Order (C.V.O.) on 11 August 1905 on the occasion of the visit of the French fleet to Britain. and soon after was promoted to the rank of Rear Admiral on 1 January 1906. At the end of that year, on 15 November 1906, he succeeded Charles H. Cross as Rear-Admiral Commanding, Portsmouth Reserve Division

== Rugby union career ==
Login was selected to play for England whilst playing for the Royal Naval College, where he was beginning career in the Royal Navy. He made his only international appearance on December 13, 1875, in Dublin in England's victory over Ireland at Rathmines in Ireland's debut international. Having played for the Royal Naval College, Login continued to be involved with rugby in the Royal Navy and when the Royal Navy Rugby Union was formed in 1907 he served as its first president.

== Bibliography ==
- "Obituary" (Obituaries). The Times. Saturday, 23 January 1909. Issue 38864, col E, p. 13.
