= David Craigie =

Scottish physician (1793–1866)

David Craigie FRSE (6 June 1793 – 17 May 1866) was a Scottish physician, known as a medical author.

== Life ==
Craigie was born in Leith, Edinburgh's harbour town, on 6 June 1793, and took his MD degree in the University of Edinburgh in 1816. In 1832 he became a Fellow of the Edinburgh College of Physicians. In the same year his address is listed as 39 Nicolson Street in the south side of Edinburgh.

He was elected a Fellow of the Royal Society of Edinburgh in 1833 his proposer being Thomas Shortt.

Craigie was physician to the Edinburgh Infirmary from 1833 to 1846, and was the founder, owner and editor of the Edinburgh Medical and Surgical Journal 1832 to 1855. He was President of the Royal College of Physicians of Edinburgh from 1861 to 1863.

After a period of failing health he died on 17 May 1866. He is buried in Old Newington Cemetery, now known as East Preston Street Cemetery in the south of the city.

== Works ==
In 1828 Craigie published Elements of General and Pathological Anatomy, of which a second edition appeared in 1848. He wrote Elements of Anatomy, General, Special, and Comparative, and in 1836 Elements of the Practice of Physic. He was also the author of Morbid Anatomy.

He assisted with John Thomson's Life of William Cullen, and published 30 papers on medical subjects.
