= HMS Repulse (1892) =

Royal Sovereign-class battleship

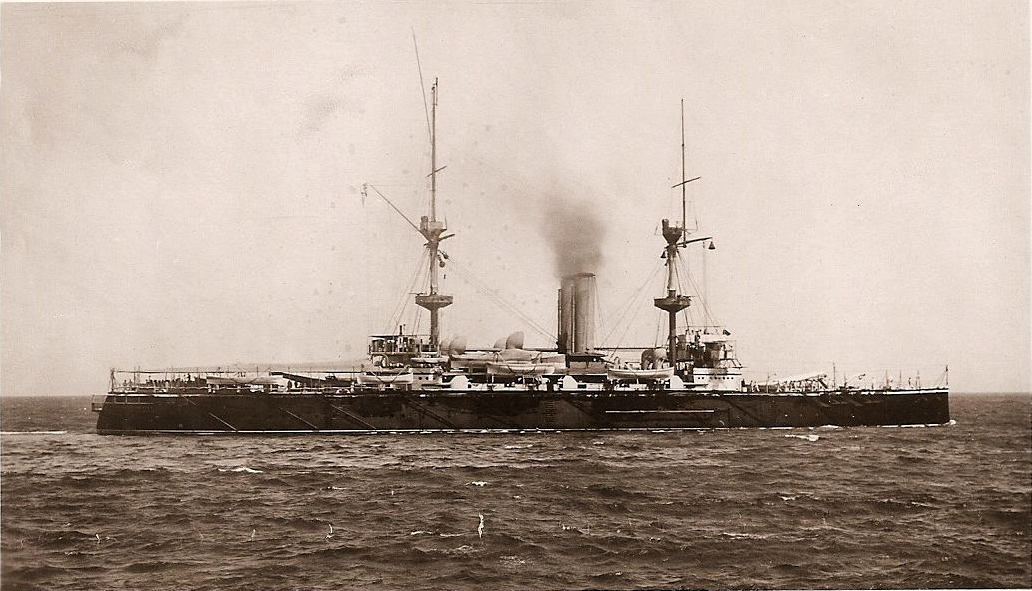
- A postcard of Repulse underway

History

United Kingdom
- Name: Repulse
- Ordered: 1889 Naval Programme
- Builder: Pembroke Dockyard
- Cost: £915,302
- Way number: No. 1
- Laid down: 1 January 1890
- Launched: 27 February 1892
- Completed: 21 April 1894
- Commissioned: 25 April 1894
- Decommissioned: February 1911
- Fate: Sold for scrap, 11 July 1911

General characteristics (as built)
- Class & type: Royal Sovereign-class predreadnought battleship
- Displacement: 14,150 long tons (14,380 t)
- Length: 380 ft (115.8 m) (pp)
- Beam: 75 ft (22.9 m)
- Draught: 27 ft 6 in (8.4 m)
- Installed power: 11,000 ihp (8,200 kW); 8 cylindrical boilers
- Propulsion: 2 shafts; 2 Triple-expansion steam engines
- Speed: 17.5 knots (32.4 km/h; 20.1 mph)
- Range: 4,720 nmi (8,740 km; 5,430 mi) @ 10 knots (19 km/h; 12 mph)
- Complement: 670
- Armament: 2 × twin 13.5 in (343 mm) guns; 10 × single 6 in (152 mm) guns; 10 × single 6-pdr (57 mm (2.2 in)) guns; 12 × single 3-pdr (47 mm (1.9 in)) guns; 7 × 18-inch (450 mm) torpedo tubes
- Armour: Main belt: 14–18 in (356–457 mm); bulkheads: 14–16 in (356–406 mm); Barbettes: 11–17 in (279–432 mm); Casemates: 6 in (152 mm); Conning tower: 14 in (356 mm); Deck: 2.5–3 in (64–76 mm)

HMS Repulse was one of seven Royal Sovereign-class pre-dreadnought battleships built for the Royal Navy in the 1890s. Assigned to the Channel Fleet, where she often served as a flagship, after commissioning in 1894, the ship participated in a series of annual manoeuvres, and the Queen Victoria's Diamond Jubilee Fleet Review during the rest of the decade. Repulse was transferred to the Mediterranean Fleet in 1902 and remained there until December 1903, when she returned home for an extensive refit. After its completion in 1905, Repulse was assigned to the Reserve Fleet until she was sold for scrap in 1911.

== Design and description ==
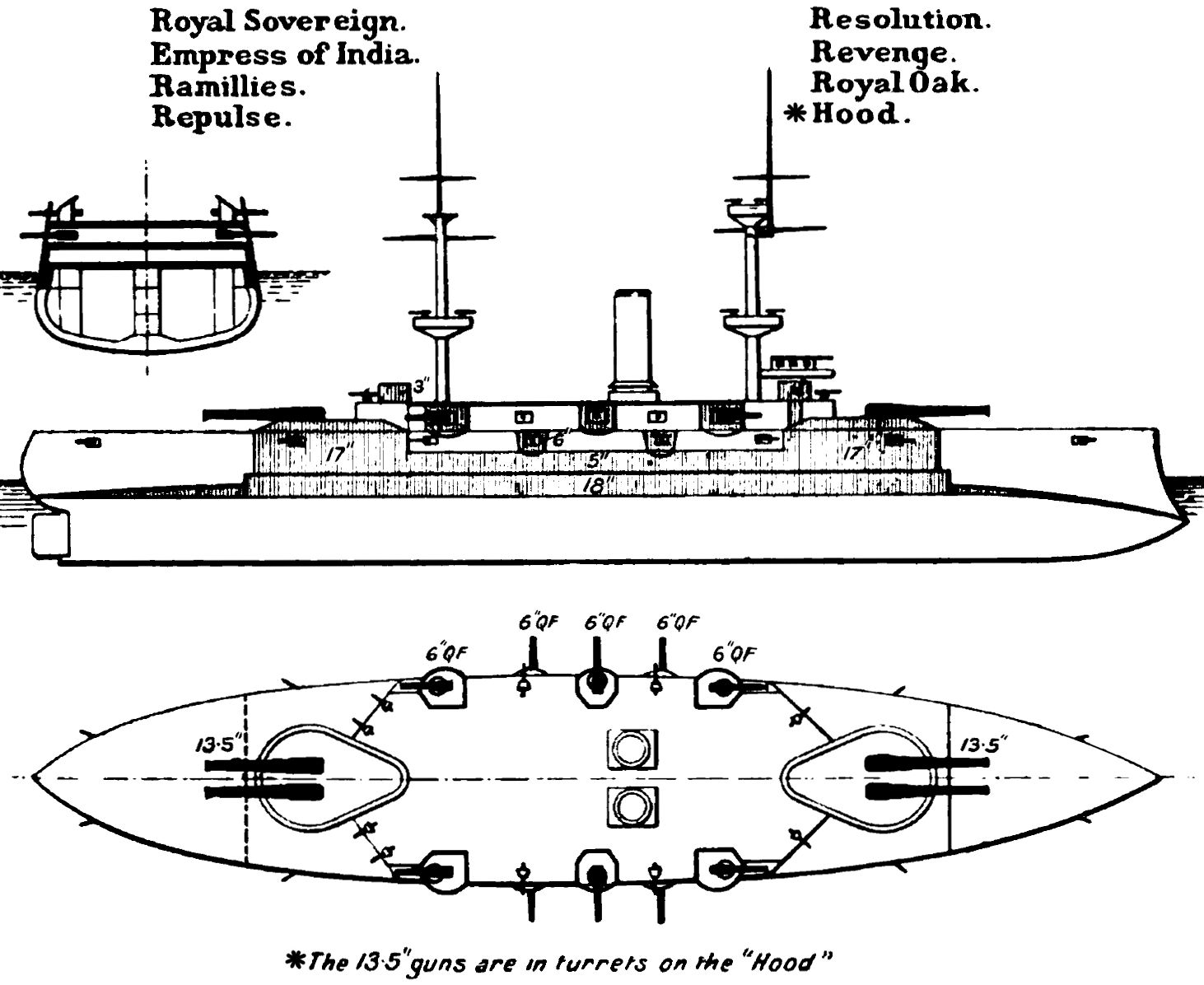
Right elevation, plan and cross-section of the Royal Sovereigns from Brassey's Naval Annual, 1906

The design of the Royal Sovereign-class ships was derived from that of the Admiral-class ironclad battleships, greatly enlarged to improve seakeeping and to provide space for a secondary armament as in the preceding Trafalgar-class ironclad battleships. The ships displaced 14,150 long tons (14,380 t) at normal load and 15,580 long tons (15,830 t) at deep load. They had a length between perpendiculars of 380 feet (115.8 m) and were 410 feet 6 inches (125.1 m) long overall, a beam of 75 feet (22.9 m), and a draught of 27 feet 6 inches (8.4 m). As a flagship, Repulse's crew consisted of 670 officers and ratings in 1903.

Repulse was powered by a pair of three-cylinder, vertical triple-expansion steam engines, each driving one shaft. Her Humphrys & Tennant engines were designed to produce a total of 11,000 indicated horsepower (8,200 kW) and a maximum speed of 17.5 knots (32.4 km/h; 20.1 mph) using steam provided by eight cylindrical boilers with forced draught. The ship reached a speed of 17.8 knots (33.0 km/h; 20.5 mph) during her sea trials. The Royal Sovereign-class ships carried a maximum of 1,420 long tons (1,443 t) of coal which gave them a range of 4,720 nautical miles (8,740 km; 5,430 mi) at a speed of 10 knots (19 km/h; 12 mph).

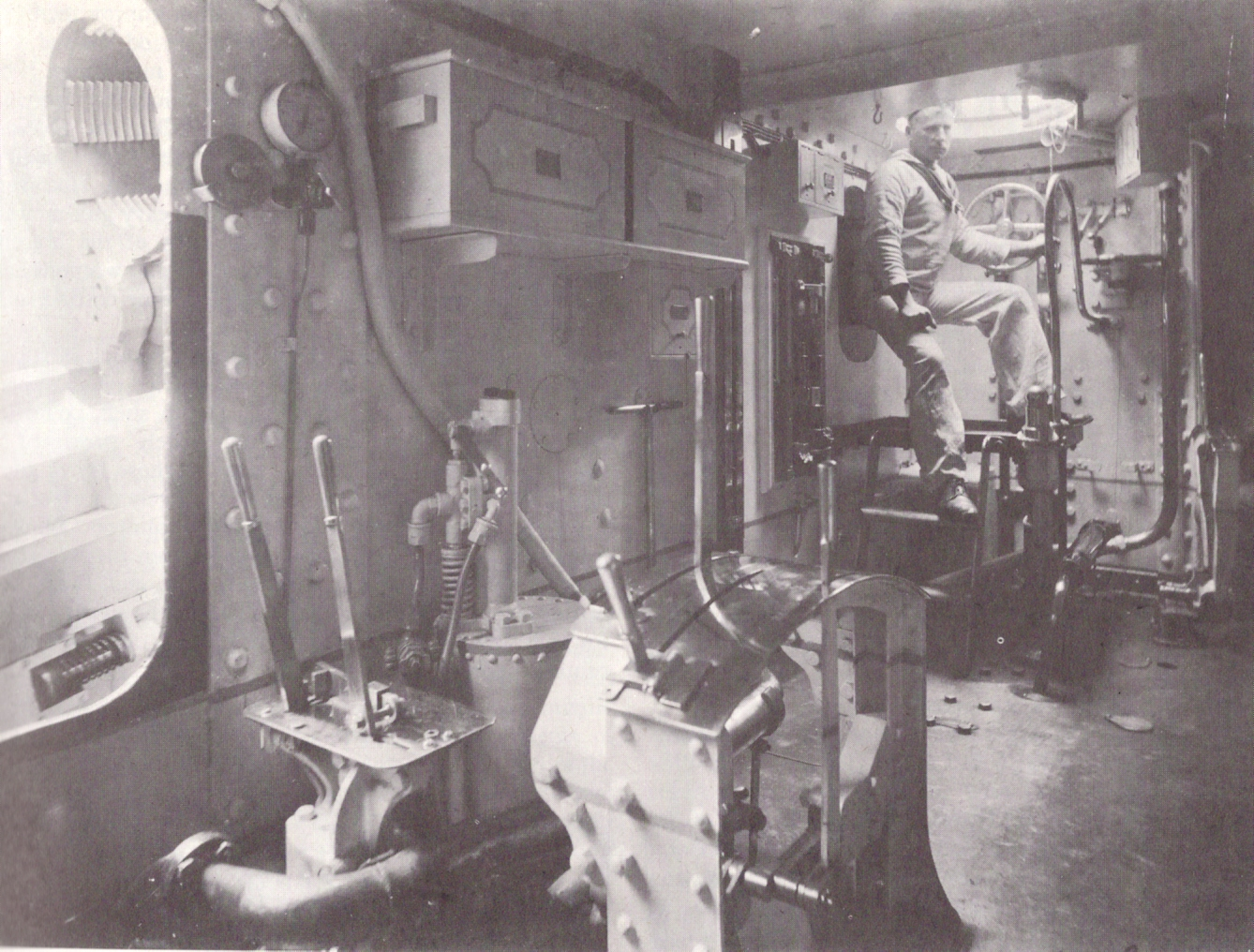
An interior view of the starboard side of Repulse's after 13.5-inch (343 mm) barbette. The breech of the barbette's starboard gun, its breech block removed, can be seen through the opening at far left. Levers controlling the barbette's hydraulic system are in the foreground. Thin splinter plating covers the top of the barbette, through which two sighting ports protruded; the sailor at rear has his head partially through the starboard sighting port.

Their main armament consisted of four breech-loading (BL) 13.5-inch (343 mm) guns mounted in two twin-barbette mountings, one each fore and aft of the superstructure. Each gun was provided with 80 rounds. Their secondary armament consisted of ten quick-firing (QF) 6-inch (152 mm) guns. 200 rounds per gun were carried by the ships. Sixteen QF 6-pounder (2.2 in (57 mm)) guns of an unknown type and a dozen QF 3-pounder (1.9 in (47 mm)) Hotchkiss guns were fitted for defence against torpedo boats. The two 3-pounders in the upper fighting top were removed by 1902 and all of the remaining light guns from the lower fighting tops and main deck followed in 1905–09. Repulse carried seven 14-inch (356 mm) torpedo tubes, although four were removed in 1902.

The Royal Sovereigns' armour scheme was similar to that of the Trafalgars, as the waterline belt of compound armour only protected the area between the barbettes. The 14–18-inch (356–457 mm) belt and transverse bulkheads 14–16 inches (356–406 mm) thick closed off the ends of the belt. Above the belt was a strake of 4-inch (102 mm) nickel-steel armour closed off by 3-inch (76 mm) transverse bulkheads. The barbettes were protected by compound armour, ranging in thickness from 11 to 17 inches (279 to 432 mm) and the casemates for the 6-inch guns had a thickness equal to their diameter. The thicknesses of the armour deck ranged from 2.5 to 3 inches (64 to 76 mm). The walls of the forward conning tower were 12–14 inches (305–356 mm) thick and the aft conning tower was protected by 3-inch plates.

== Construction and career ==
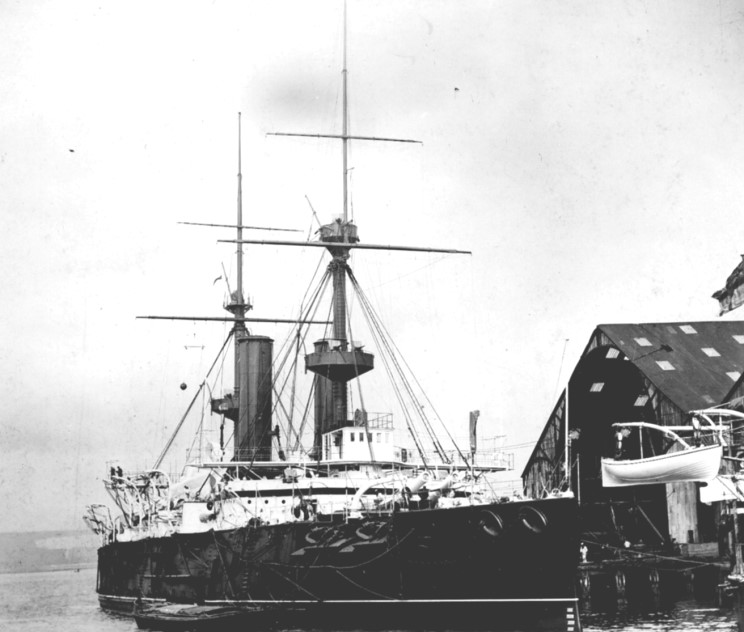
Repulse at anchor in Portsmouth Dockyard, 1893

Repulse was the tenth ship of her name to serve in the Royal Navy. She was ordered under the Naval Defence Act Programme of 1889 and laid down on 1 January 1890 on Pembroke Dockyard's No. 1 Slipway. The ship was launched on 27 February 1892 by Lady Philipps, wife of Sir Charles Philipps, Bt, Lord Lieutenant of Haverfordwest. The ship was transferred to Portsmouth Dockyard on 5 December, where she was completed on 21 April 1894, at a cost of £915,302. Repulse commissioned there, commanded by Captain Burges Watson, four days later to relieve the ironclad battleship Rodney in the Channel Fleet. She participated in annual manoeuvres in the Irish Sea and Atlantic Ocean in August as a unit of the "Blue Fleet." From 19 to 24 June 1895, the ship was part of the squadron that visited Germany for the opening of the Kaiser Wilhelm Canal. In July–August 1895, Repulse again took part in the annual manoeuvres and Watson was relieved by Captain Ernest Rolfe on 10 October. The ship participated in the manoeuvres again in July 1896, when they were held in the Southwest Approaches and the ship was a unit of "Fleet A." Repulse accidentally collided with her sister ship Resolution on 18 July, but sustained no significant damage. On 23 December, there was an explosion in one of her coal bunkers that injured nine men.

On 26 June 1897, the ship was present at the Fleet Review at Spithead for the Diamond Jubilee of Queen Victoria. The following month, Repulse took part in the annual manoeuvres, this time held off the coast of Ireland. On 21 December, Captain Robert Groome assumed command of the ship; he was relieved by Captain Randolph Foote on 28 June 1899. In July and August, when the annual manoeuvres were held in the Atlantic, she participated as a unit of "Fleet A". Repulse suffered a mishap on 4 February 1900 when a strong tide forced her to collide with an anchored barge as she departed Sheerness. In August 1900, she again was involved in annual manoeuvre in the Atlantic, this time as a unit of "Fleet A1." The following month, Foote was replaced by Captain Spencer Login on the 18th. On 27 October 1901, she ran aground in mud while under tow to her moorings, but was refloated undamaged two hours later.

Repulse departed England on 5 April 1902 for service with the Mediterranean Fleet, and arrived at Malta two weeks later. In the Mediterranean, she took part in combined exercises of the Mediterranean Fleet, Channel Fleet, and the Cruiser Squadron off Cephalonia and Morea between 29 September and 6 October 1902. Completing her Mediterranean service, she departed Malta on 29 November 1903, arriving at Plymouth on 10 December 1903. She then paid off at Chatham Dockyard on 5 February 1904 for an extensive refit.

With the refit complete, Repulse recommissioned at Chatham, under the command of Captain Henry Totteham, on 3 January 1905 for service in reserve with a nucleus crew. Captain Herbert Heath relieved Tottenham shortly afterwards on 27 February and the ship took part in Reserve Fleet manoeuvres in July. She transferred that crew to the predreadnought battleship Irresistible on 27 November 1906 and received new crew. On 25 February 1907, Repulse departed Chatham for Devonport, to serve there as a special service vessel. The predreadnought battleship HMS Majestic relieved the ship of this duty on 2 August 1910. In December, Repulse moved to Portsmouth, where she was taken out of service in February 1911. She was sold for scrap on 11 July 1911 to Thos. W. Ward for £33,500, and arrived at Morecambe to be broken up on 27 July.
