= John Spencer Login =

Scottish surgeon

Sir John Spencer Login
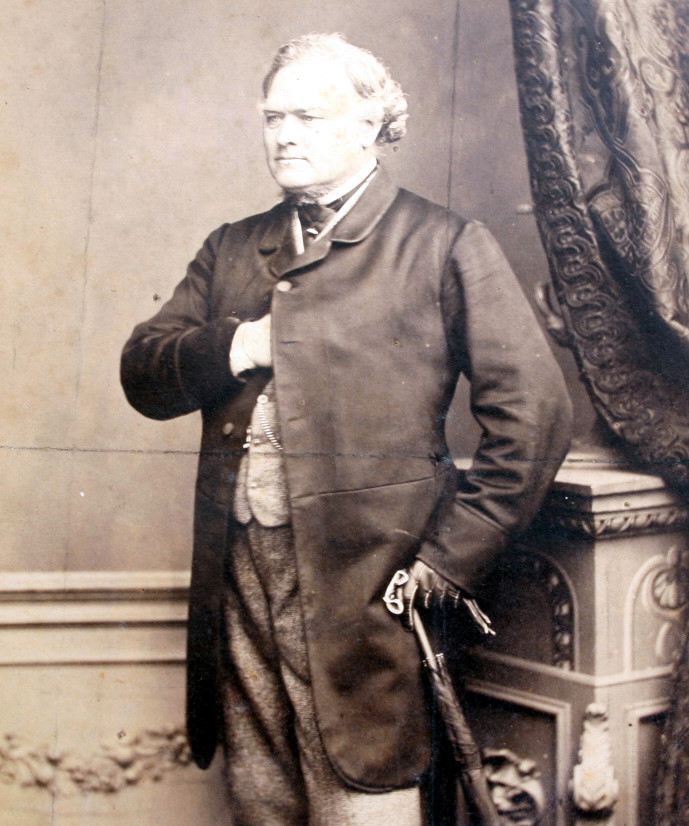
- Born: 9 November 1809; Stromness, Orkney, United Kingdom
- Died: 18 October 1863 (aged 53); Felixstowe, Suffolk, United Kingdom
- Education: University of Edinburgh
- Occupations: Surgeon, Royal Navy
- Known for: Guardianship of Maharajah Duleep Singh and Koh-i-Noor
- Spouse: Lena Campbell

Sir John Spencer Login (9 November 1809 – 18 October 1863) was a Scottish surgeon in British India, best remembered as the guardian of Maharajah Duleep Singh and the Koh-i-Noor diamond following the annexation of Punjab and Last Treaty of Lahore.

Born in the seaport of Stromness, Orkney, in 1809, Login went on to study medicine at the University of Edinburgh and was, within a few years, offered the post of assistant surgeon for the East India Company. Arriving in Calcutta in 1832, he initially had appointments with the Bengal establishment and the Nizam's army. Later roles included, amongst others, a medical charge of the horse artillery in the Afghan campaign, residency surgeoncy at Lucknow, action in the Second Anglo-Sikh War and in 1849, the appointment as the Governor of Lahore.

It was under Login and his wife's guidance that Duleep Singh converted to Christianity and was escorted to England in 1854. After a final trip to India, Login died shortly after his return to England in 1863.

== Early life and family ==
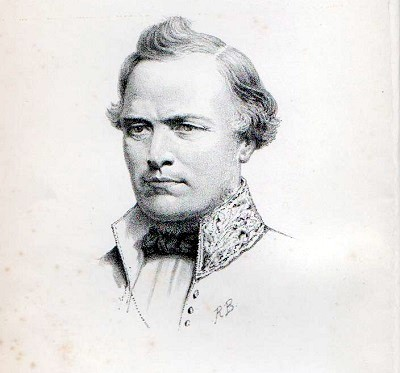
John Spencer Login by R.B.

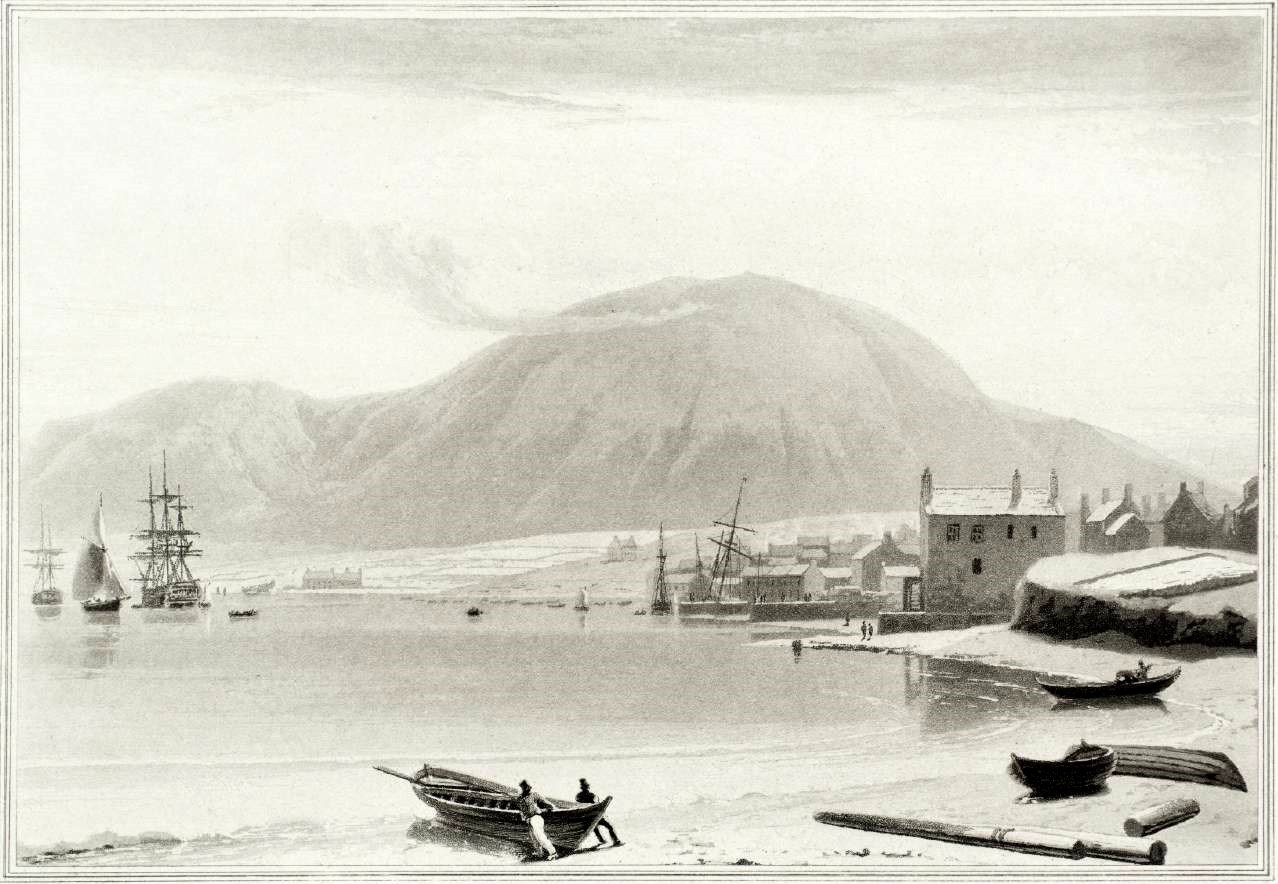
Stromness, Orkney. William Daniell, c. 1815.

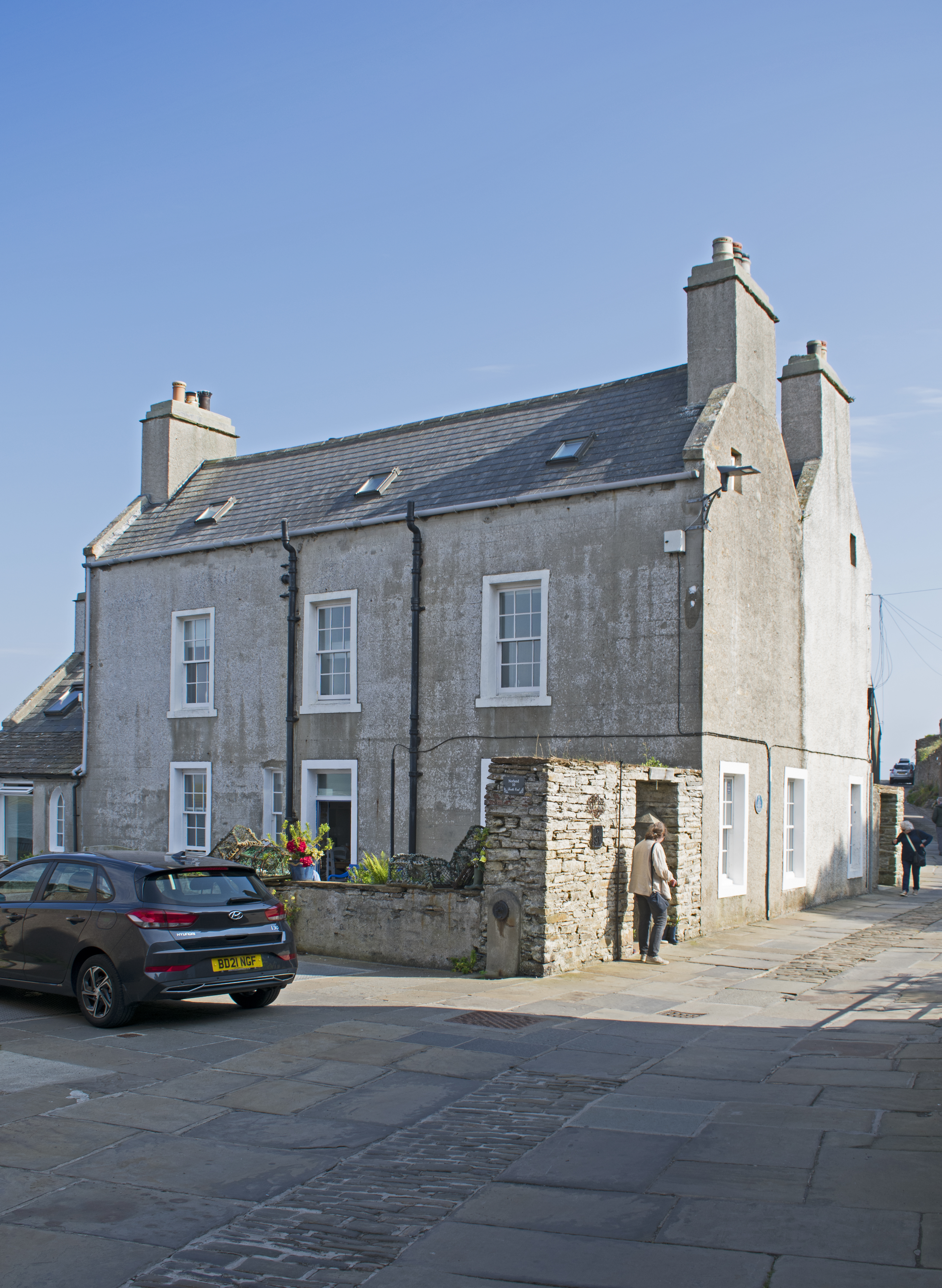
The birthplace of Login, 10 South End, Stromness

John Spencer Login was born in Stromness, Orkney, on 9 November 1809, to John Login of the merchant navy and his wife Margaret Spence, from Kirbuster, Birsay. He was ten years older than his brother, the Reverend William S. Login and there were at least two other brothers, Tom and James.

Login's father had settled in Stromness after retiring from the merchant navy and set up his own shipping business, part owning shipping vessels. At the time, Stromness was a busy trading port. Login's paternal grandfather had worked for the Hudson's Bay Company and was a regular visitor to Stromness, and his maternal grandfather had commanded a merchant vessel to the West Indies. His maternal grandmother was the daughter of Edward Groundwater from Orphir. With frequent travellers in town, the Login family would often have short-term lodgers who would share their travel stories. Login, perhaps, became inspired by these stories of the sea. The fear of their son going to sea led, Login's parents to send him to school in Kirkwall. Here, however, Login continued to hear sea stories from fishermen.

Login's family encountered financial hardship when Login's father died prematurely and due to the absence of insurance, the family could no longer afford to repair the increasing number of shipwrecks. They eventually became reliant on the charity and hospitality of friends. As the Hudson Bay agent for Stromness, Margaret managed the inn, near the Login's Well.

== Early medical career ==
Login was admitted to study medicine at the University of Edinburgh under James Syme at around the age of 15. Subsequently, he became surgeon-dresser to Adam Hunter and John Campbell at the Infirmary in Edinburgh. He received his licentiate (LRCSE) in 1828 at age 19.

In 1829, he became house surgeon to Robert Liston and John Lizars, following which he became physician's clerk to James Gregory, Thomas Shortt and Robert Christison. He obtained his MD at the age of 21 years in 1831.

At the recommendation of Thomas Shortt, Login was sent to provide medical supervision to the Lord Chief Commissioner Adam. Pleased with his treatment, Login was subsequently offered the post of assistant surgeon for the East India Company by John Loch, the Lord Chief's son-in-law.

== Early years in India ==
Login arrived in Calcutta in July 1832, as assistant surgeon on the Bengal establishment, initially posted to the Buffs and then accompanying the regiment to Dinapore in October. He was appointed to the Bengal horse artillery in the same year.

In 1834, he was appointed to the Nizam's army and in 1836, to the staff of Lord Metcalfe, Lieutenant-Governor of the North-Western Provinces.

In 1838, he was appointed medical charge of the horse artillery in the Afghan campaign.

== Lucknow ==
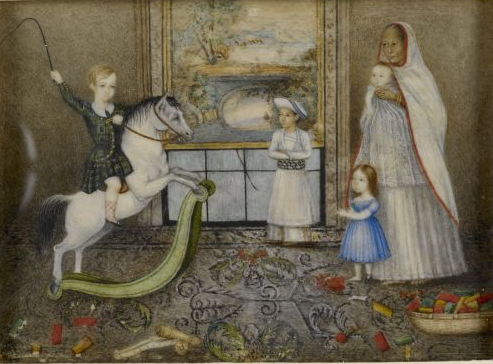
The Children of Sir John Spencer Login in Lucknow, anon. Miniature on ivory, 1846.

Considered an appointment of good fate and fortune due to subsidies and favours from the Vizier of Oudh, Login was appointed to the Resident Surgeon at Lucknow in 1838 as well as physician to the court of Oudh and Postmaster General of Oudh. Unlike his predecessors, his wife noted in her diaries that he did not take advantage of this position.

Login became an effective member of the Board of Management as the Honorary Secretary of the Martiniere College in Lucknow, compiling the college rules.

It was in Lucknow that Login met Lena Campbell in 1842. She too was from Scotland and had come to India with her sister and brother-in-law, Major Hope Dick. They married in July of that year. Their children were depicted in a miniature on ivory by an anonymous Indian artist in 1846. The scene shows their oldest son Edward William Spencer Login (born 1843) on a rocking horse, their daughter Lena Margaret Campbell Login (1845) in a blue dress, and the infant Louisa Marion d’Arcy Login (1846) held by the children's ayah. The Indian child in the picture is unidentified. Ultimately, they had six children one of whom was Spencer Login, an early rugby union international who represented England in 1875 and also had a career in the Royal Navy, rising to the rank of rear admiral.

As physician to the Court of Oudh, Login was barred from directly examining women in the zenana. However, here, his wife Lena was able assist in diagnosing the medical conditions.

In 1839, Login took responsibility for two thousand poor in Herat. After assisting with the re-building of the carpet weaving industry, political instability in the area caused the British mission to leave and Login to move to Kandahar and then Kabul, eventually returning again to Lucknow.

Rejoining the Horse Artillery in 1848, Login sent his wife and children back to England. He then fought in the Second Anglo-Sikh War.

== Maharajah Duleep Singh and the Koh-i-Noor ==
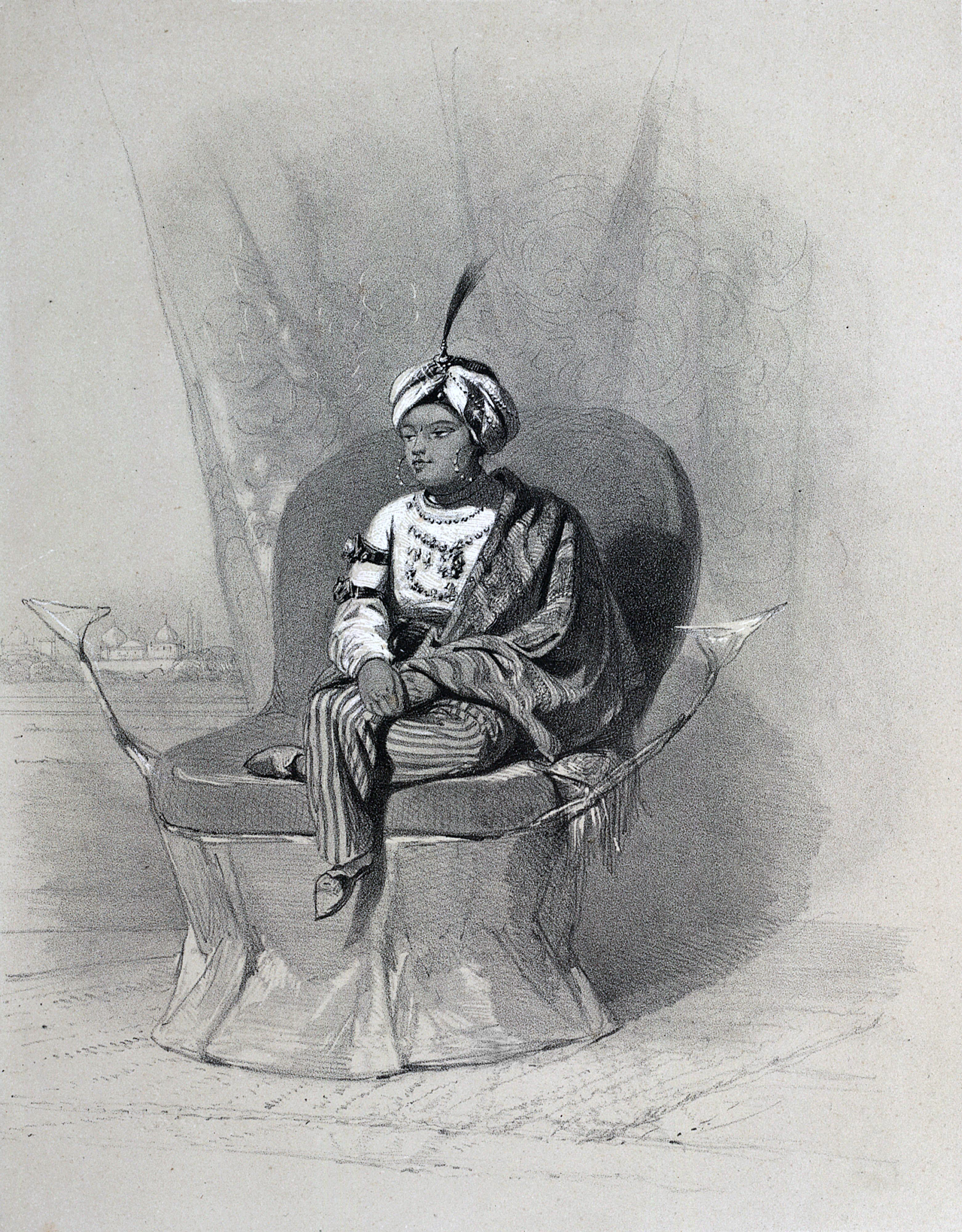
A young Maharaja Duleep Singh. After Charles Stewart Hardinge, 1847.

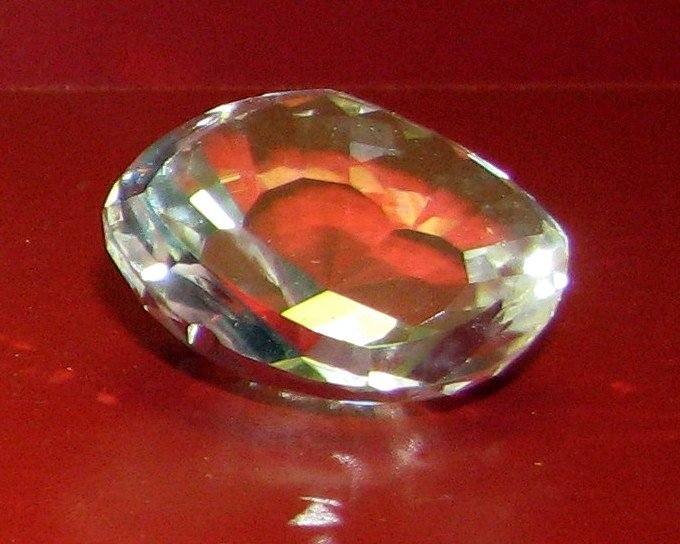
Replica of the Koh-i-Noor diamond before re-cutting in 1852

Following the death of Maharajah Ranjit Singh in 1839 and the ensuing decade of power struggles, civil war and First Anglo-Sikh War, the East India Company army defeated the Sikhs in 1849, resulting in the inducement of the ten year old Maharajah Duleep Singh to sign the Last Treaty of Lahore with the consequential annexation of Punjab. Subsequently, Login was entrusted with the company's two most significant possessions, the guardianship of Maharajah Duleep Singh and the protection of the Koh-i-Noor diamond.

In addition, Login was put in charge of cataloguing the newly acquired treasures of the Sikh government's toshakhana (treasury). He meticulously measured, described and recorded the details of each jewel. He was also in charge of the post office in Punjab. It was said that the British regarded Login as the most trustworthy man in all India.

Login was first introduced to the ten year old Maharajah Duleep Singh on 6 April 1849, just a few days after he had been appointed Governor of "the Citadel of Lahore and all that it contains". They moved from Lahore to Fatehgarh Park, Fatehgarh, where Login introduced an English type of learning. Impressed with the young Duleep Singh's handsome looks and attitudes, Login noted his (Duleep's) preferences for isolation, but attributed this to the "maharajah's contemplative nature" rather than to unhappiness. Apprehensive about the manner in which the diamond had been obtained, he avoided the subject with Duleep Singh. In addition, he avoided conversation about Singh's mother Jind Kaur. It was, according to George Bruce Malleson, under Login's guidance that Duleep Singh "developed into a Christian gentleman, an English courtier, and a Scottish laird", who saw Login as a significant figure in his life, calling him "MaBap", a collective appellation for mother and father.

The Koh-i-Noor was eventually handed over to Governor-General Dalhousie at the end of 1849 by Login, whilst still set in the armlet that Maharajah Ranjeet Singh had once worn.

Lena Login returned to India to assist in the upbringing of Duleep Singh and later they escorted Duleep Singh to England in 1854.

== Later life ==
Back in England, Login was knighted in 1854, and with his wife continued the guardianship of the Duleep Singh until 1858. In the same year, he retired from the Bengal Medical Service.

Following the Indian Rebellion of 1857, he sat on the committee that was set up to investigate all reported brutalities, being one of the interviewers himself.

== Death and legacy ==
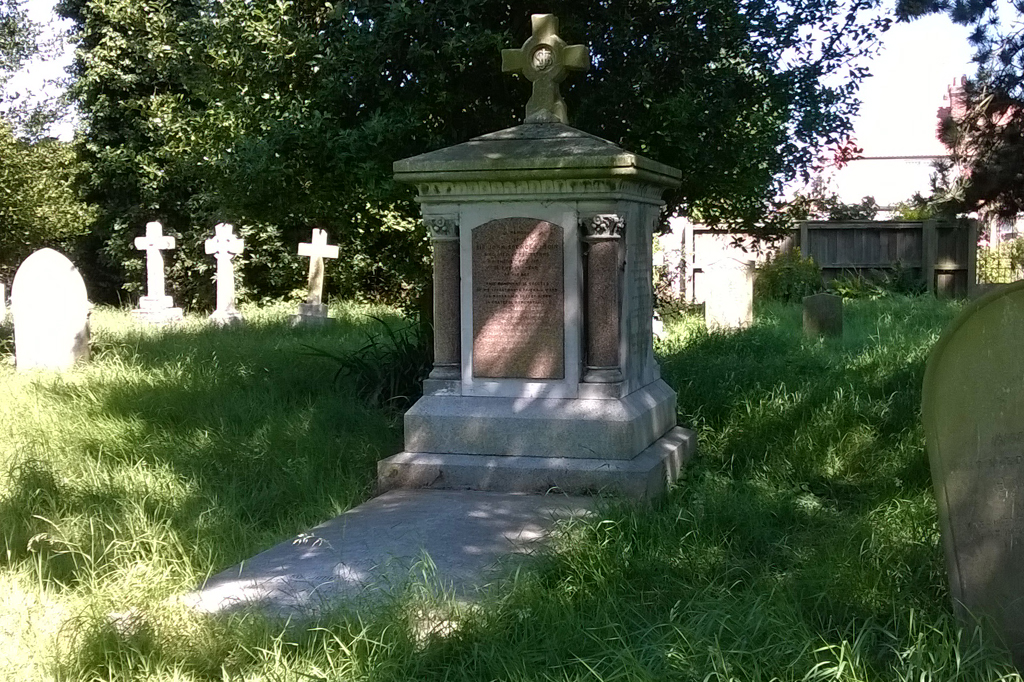
Grave of John Login, Felixstowe, Suffolk

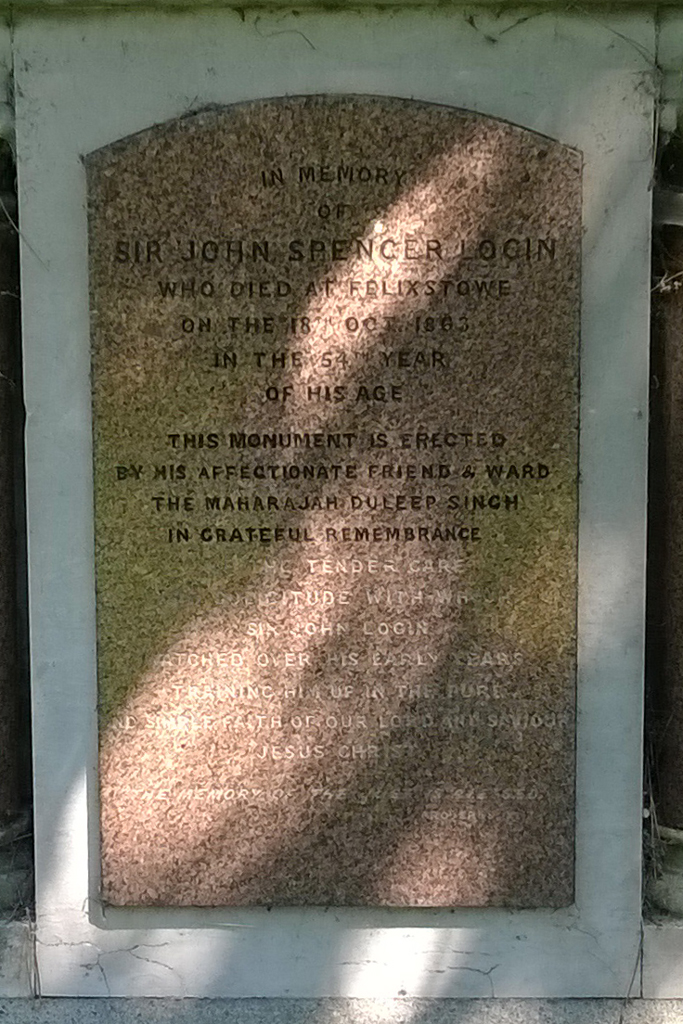
Tombstone of Login

In 1862-3 he visited India for the last time, to establish the Indian Railways. Upon his return to Britain, he died suddenly at Felixstowe on 18 October 1863 following a short illness and two months after the death of Duleep Singh's mother.

Local coastguards in Felixstowe carried his coffin for one mile to the church. He had been described as "truthful" by Lord Lawrence, past Viceroy of India and "a thoroughly good, conscientious man" by Queen Victoria's private secretary, Sir Charles Phipps. For a "heartbroken" Duleep Singh, Login's death was likened to the loss of a father. His tombstone, erected by Duleep Singh, was engraved with words chosen by Queen Victoria.

In 1890 Login's wife, Lady Lena Login, published Sir John Login and Duleep Singh, her memoirs of their relationship.

In 2015, photograph albums thought to have once belonged to Login were sold at auction.

== Citations ==
- William Dalrymple and Anita Anand, Koh-i-Noor: The History of the World's Most Infamous Diamond. Bloomsbury Publishing (2017). ISBN 978-1-63557-077-9
