= Timur Ruby =

Historical Precious Gemstone (Ruby)

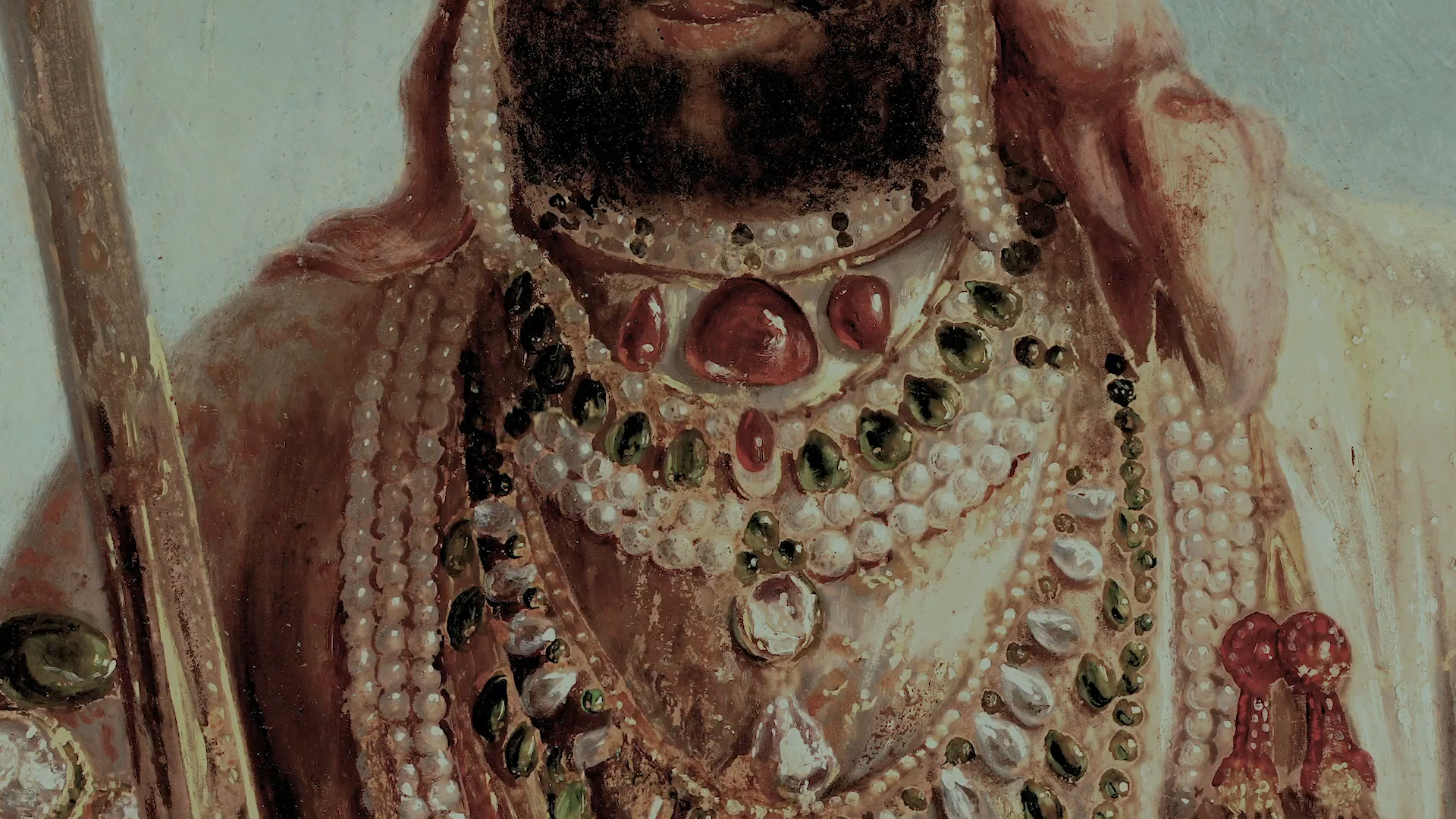
Detail of the Timur Ruby from a painting of Maharaja Sher Singh of the Sikh Empire, by August Schoefft, c. 1841–42

The Timur Ruby (also Khiraj-i-alam, "Tribute to the World") is an unfaceted, 352.54-carat (71 g) polished red spinel set in a necklace. It is named after the ruler Timur, founder of the Timurid Empire and purportedly one of its former owners. It was believed to be a ruby until 1851.

It is inscribed with the titles of five of its previous owners: Jahangir (who also had the name of his father Akbar the Great inscribed), Shah Jahan, Farrukhsiyar, Nader Shah and Ahmad Shah Durrani.

Since 1612, the owners of the Timur Ruby have also owned the Koh-i-Noor diamond. It has been in the possessions of the Safavid, Mughal, Sikh and British empires, and is currently part of the Royal Collection.

== History ==
=== Origins ===
Spinels are found in various parts of the world, including the Transoxiana region that was home to the Mughal ancestors.

The Timur Ruby is historically associated with Timur, who was believed to have taken the gem during the invasion of Delhi in 1398. In 1996, however, research indicated that it was never owned by Timur.

=== Possession of the Mughal emperors ===
During the seventeenth century, the gem was in the ownership of Shah Abbas I, the Safavid Emperor of Iran. In 1612, he gave it to the Mughal Emperor Jahangir. Jahangir had it engraved with his own name and that of his father (Akbar the Great).

The stone passed to subsequent Mughal Emperors, including Shah Jahan (who had it set in the Peacock Throne) and Aurangzeb. Shah Jahan and Farrukhsiyar also inscribed their names on the stone.

=== Removal from India ===
In 1739, Iranian ruler Nader Shah seized the gem during his occupation of Delhi. Nader took the Peacock Throne as part of his treasure, but removed the Timur Ruby and the Koh-i-Noor diamond to wear on an armband. He called the Timur ruby the "Ayn al-Hur" ("Eye of the Houri), and added to its inscription.

In 1747, Nader Shah was assassinated. The Timur Ruby was taken by his commander Ahmad Shah Durrani, who became King of Afghanistan.

=== Return to the Punjab ===
In 1810, it returned to India when Ahmad Shah's grandson Shah Shujah was forced into exile in the Punjab. In 1813, Maharaja Ranjit Singh took possession of the gem. It subsequently passed into the ownership of Maharaja Sher Singh (1841) and Maharaja Duleep Singh.

=== Removal to London ===
When the East India Company invaded Punjab in 1849, they took possession of the Timur Ruby and the Koh-i-Noor diamond from Duleep Singh.

In 1851, the Timur Ruby was displayed at the Great Exhibition in London. That year, it was also reclassified as a spinel rather than a ruby. After the Great Exhibition closed the Court of Directors of the East India Company presented the gem to Queen Victoria as a gift after which it became her private possession.

The gem was set in a necklace by Garrards in 1853. Shortly afterwards, it was modified so that it could hold the Koh-i-Noor as an occasional alternative.

After the necklace was lengthened in 1911, it was rarely worn.

The spinel is now part of the Royal Collection.

== See also ==
- List of individual gemstones
