= Land Reform Board =

Government body in Bangladesh

- Formation: 1989
- Headquarters: Dhaka, Bangladesh
- Region served: Bangladesh
- Official language: Bengali
- Chairman (Secretary): A. J. M Salahuddin Nagari
- Website: Land Reform Board

The Land Reform Board (Bengali: ভূমি সংস্কার বোর্ড) is a government board responsible for land reform and monitoring the implementation of government policies on land. It is located in Dhaka, Bangladesh. It is under the Ministry of Land. It carries out its duties through the local Upazila Land Offices and Union Tehsil offices.

== History ==
The Land Reform Board traces its origins to the Board of Revenue formed on 13 August 1772 by Warren Hastings, which continued till 1971 when it was abolished after the Independence of Bangladesh. The functions of the Board of Revenue was placed under the Land Administration and Land Reforms Division of the Ministry of Land Administration and Land Reforms in 1971. The functions of the board were taken over by the ministry and the supervision and inspection functions were given to land reforms commissioner and four deputy land reforms commissioners in 1973. The Land Administration Board was formed in 1980 through the Land administration Board Act-1980 (Act no X111 of 1981). In 1987 the Ministry of Land Administration and Land Reforms was reorganized and renamed as the Ministry of Land. The Land Reform Board was formed in 1989 through passage of the Act no-23 of 1989 in the Bangladesh Parliament and based on the recommendations of the National Land Reforms Council.
