= Lena, Lady Login =

Scottish courtier and author

Lena Login
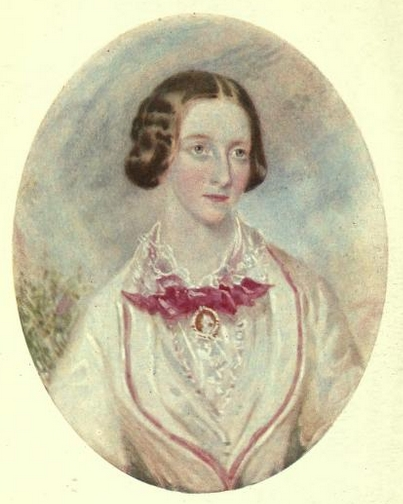
- Lena Login from a miniature by Fisher, 1850
- Born: Lena Campbell; 1820; Perth, Scotland
- Died: 17 April 1904 (aged 83–84); Aylesford, England
- Occupations: Courtier, author
- Spouse: Sir John Spencer Login
- Children: 6

Lena, Lady Login (née Campbell; 1820 – 17 April 1904) was a Scottish courtier and author. She was involved with educating Duleep Singh, deposed maharaja of the Sikh kingdom of the Punjab, when he was still a child, and later with bringing him to the UK. Queen Victoria asked her to look after another exiled Indian noble, Victoria Gouramma, daughter of the deposed ruler of Coorg, and to find her an acceptable husband.

== Life ==
Login was born in Perth in Scotland in 1820. She went to India with her sister and brother-in-law, Major Hope Dick. It was in Lucknow that she married John Spencer Login in 1842. He was the Resident Surgeon at Lucknow, the physician to the court of Oudh and Postmaster General of Oudh.

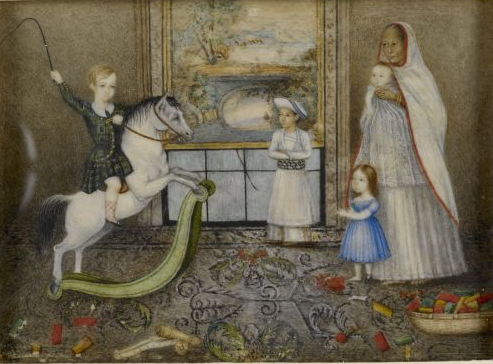
The Children of Sir John Spencer Login in Lucknow, anon. Miniature on ivory, 1846.

As physician to the Court of Oudh, Login was barred from directly examining women in the zenana. However, here, his wife Lena was able assist in diagnosing the medical conditions.

Their children were depicted in a miniature on ivory by an anonymous Indian artist in 1846. The scene shows their oldest son Edward William Spencer Login (born 1843) on a rocking horse, their daughter Lena Margaret Campbell Login (1845) in a blue dress, and the infant Louisa Marion d’Arcy Login (1846) held by the children's ayah. She and the Indian child in the picture are unidentified. They had six children.

In 1849 her husband was made the guardian to Duleep Singh who was a deposed teenage ruler. Lena became part of his education giving him lessons in expected (British) behaviour. Duleep Singh became a Christian in 1853 and the following year they all went to Britain where her husband was knighted.

In 1858 Queen Victoria asked her to find a suitor for her goddaughter, Victoria Gouramma. There was an expectation that she would be a suitable wife for Duleep Singh who was a deposed member of royalty, but he instead chose to marry Bamba Müller, the daughter of a German merchant and Ethiopian concubine, whom American Presbyterian missionaries had educated in Cairo. Lady Login tried to find a suitable European noble to become Gowramma's husband, but Gowramma married Lena's brother Lt. Col. John Campbell, who was 30 years older.

Login died in Aylesford in 1904. She left memoirs that offer valuable descriptions of her life in India and her interactions with the young Duleep Singh.
