= Shah Jahan Diamond =

Golconda diamond

The Shah Jahan Diamond mined from Kollur, Golconda—(currently Hyderabad, India). It is a hololithic flat, table cut 56 carat diamond, used as an amulet—(Tawid'th). In late 1600 AD Mughal Emperor Jahangir gifted it to Prince Shah Jahan—(by his name it is known). Currently it is owned by Dar al Athar al Islamiyyah, Kuwait.

== History ==
The diamond is mined in Kollur, Golconda. It was first recorded when Mughal prince Shah Jahan received it as a gift from his father Mughal Emperor Jahangir who owned it since late 1600 AD, it is seen in a portrait of Shah Jahan of (1592–1666), it came in the possession of Mughal Emperor Aurangzeb and it was evaluated by Jean-Baptiste Tavernier—(17th-century French gem merchant and traveler). Later in 1739 it was brought to Persia after the Nader Shah invasion of Delhi, It was offered for sale in 1985 in Geneva auction and remained unsold. Currently owned by Dar al Athar al Islamiyyah, Kuwait National Museum, Kuwait.

== Dimensions ==
Height 3.3 centimeter, width 4.6 centimeter and weight 56.72 carat.

== See also ==
- List of diamonds
