= Thomas Shortt =

Scottish physician

Dr Thomas Shortt FRSE FRCPE (17 June 1788 – 1843) was a Scottish physician. He is chiefly remembered for drafting Napoleon's official autopsy report while serving as the Principal Medical Officer on St Helena.

== Life ==
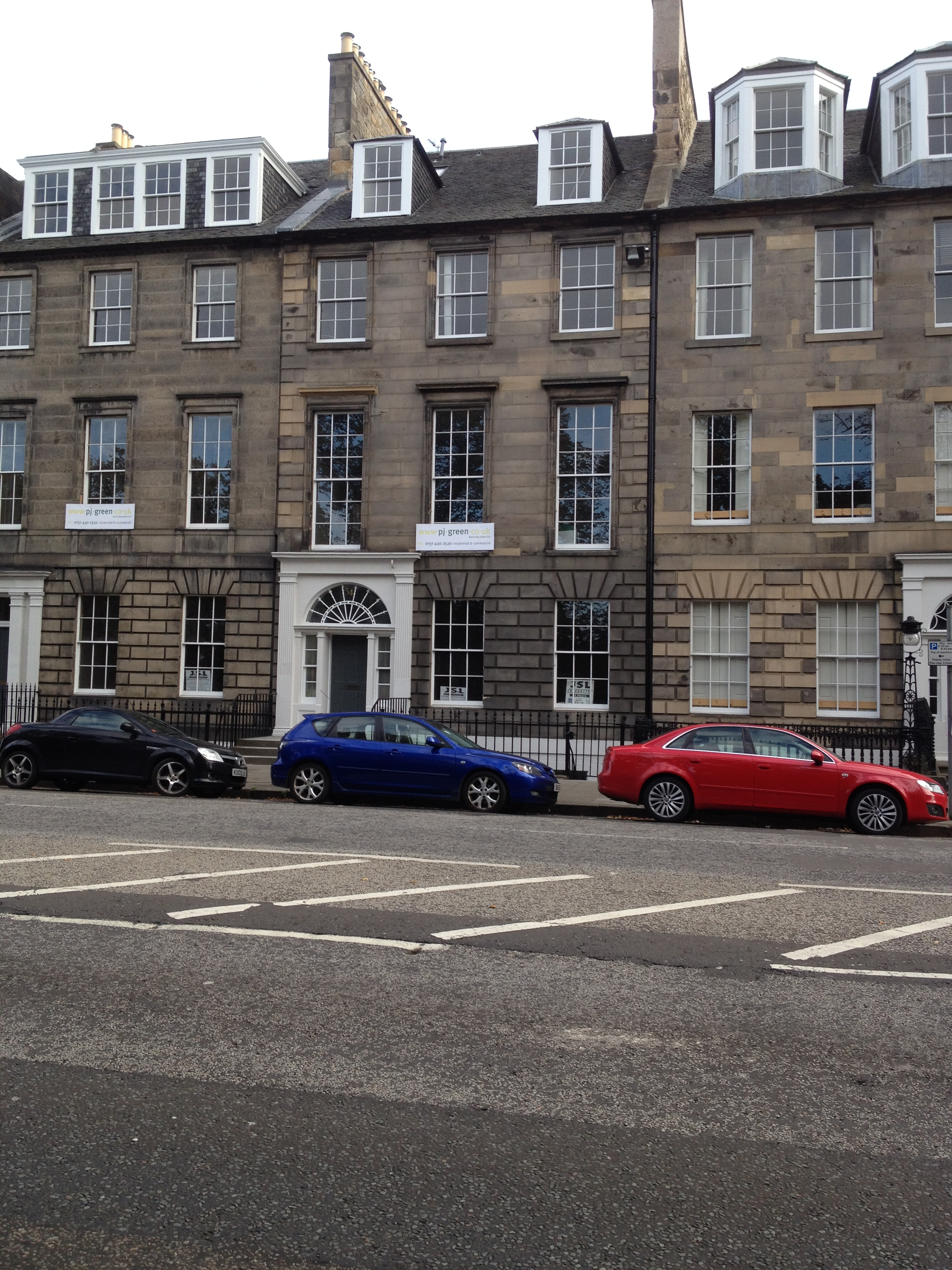
54 Queen Street, Edinburgh

Shortt was born near Dumfries on 17 June 1788, the son of Francis Shortt (of Courance & White Laird) and his wife, Bridget Smith.

He studied medicine at the University of Edinburgh graduating MB ChB. He joined the British Army in 1806 as assistant surgeon to the 10th Regiment of Foot. Most of his service was spent in Italy, Sicily, and Egypt. In 1813 he was promoted surgeon to the 20th Light Dragoons and in 1815 Physician to the Forces, before returning to practice in Edinburgh. In 1815 he gained his doctorate (MD) from the University of Edinburgh.

In 1819 he was appointed Physician Extraordinary to the King in Scotland and Principal Medical Officer in St Helena, arriving on St Helena in December 1820, during Napoleon's period of exile there. Shortt never saw Napoleon professionally, but was repeatedly consulted by the other doctors on St Helena.

From 1828 he worked at Edinburgh Royal Infirmary. He was then living at 54 Queen Street in Edinburgh's New Town.

He died on 5 March 1843.

== Family ==
He married Henrietta Young. They had five children.
