= August Schoefft =

19th-century Hungarian painter

August Theodor Schoefft
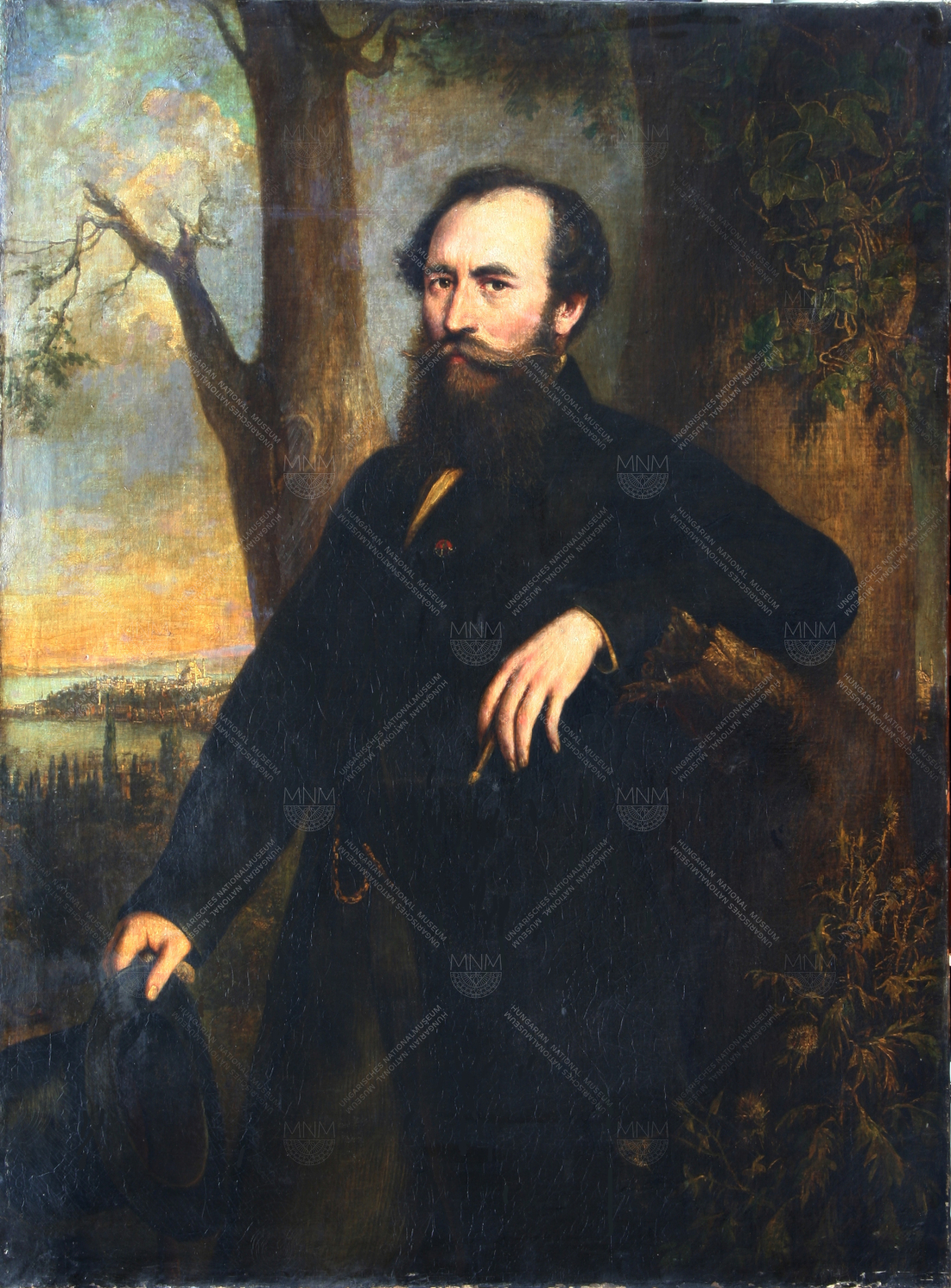
- Self-portrait of August Schoefft, oil on canvas, 1860, Hungarian National Museum, Budapest
- Born: Ágoston Schöfft; 1809; Pest, Hungary
- Died: 1888 (aged 78–79); London, England
- Notable work: Court of Lahore; Maharajah Ranjit Singh at Darbar Sahib

August Theodor Schoefft (1809 – 1888) was a 19th-century Hungarian painter. He spent more than one year in the Sikh Empire, arriving in 1841, where he painted portraits and scenes of the surrounding area. His best known works include The Court of Lahore and Maharaja Ranjit Singh at Darbar Sahib. A painting by Scheofft sold at Christie's for over £91,250 in 2009. While in India, Schoefft painted portraits of British and French officials, diplomats, and Indian princes. He also travelled to Mexico, the United States, and several countries in the Middle East, where he made further paintings, with his works being exhibited at Vienna, Paris, and London.

Interested in visually recording the exotic, Schoefft travelled from an early age, crossing several continents in his quest for foreign artistic inspiration. Engaging in Orientalism, Schoefft's paintings presented cultural imagery —sometimes accurately and other times salaciously— designed to engage European audiences with their far removed subject matter.

== Family background and early life ==
Schoefft was born into a family of sculptors from Pest whose familial atelier was active from 1775 to 1850. The familial atelier was founded by Joseph Schöfft (Doberchau, c. 1742 – Pest, 1808), grandfather of August Schoefft, who must have learnt his skills in the familial workshop in Saxony. Joseph came to Pest via Vienna and must have reached high-acclaim, seeing as a street in the city-centre was named after his atelier (Malergasse). Dozens of surviving works by Joseph have been re-identified by the Hungarian National Museum.

Joseph's son and August's father, József Károly Schöfft [Joseph Charles Schöfft] (Pest, 1776 –1851) had already enrolled as a finished painter in the preparatory class of the Academy of Fine Arts in Vienna in 1802, where he learnt drawing from Hubert Maurer (1738–1818) and painting from Franz Caucig (1755–1828). Károly came under the influence of the neoclassicist Heinrich Friedrich Füger (1751–1818) during this time. Károly graduated from the academy with the title of 'Historienmaler' ("historical painter"), which was the highest rank among the genres of painting. Károly's son was Ágoston Schöfft [August Schoefft] (Pest, 1809 – London, 1888).

The son of a local portrait painter, Schoefft was raised in an artistic milieu in Pest, Hungary; an atmosphere which encouraged his inquisitive mind and taste for the observation. Schoefft worked at his familial atelier until 1828, where-after he began his studies in Vienna.

== Artistic career ==
=== Early years in Hungary ===
Schoefft financed his various international expeditions by securing commission for several prestigious portraits in the 1820s and 30s; most famously that of Hungarian politician and aristocrat Count István Széchenyi, entitled Istvan Szechenyi at the Iron Gate of the Danube, now housed in the Bakony Museum, Veszprém. After completing his European studies, Schoefft had a short-stay in hometown of Pest, and then after that embarked on a world-tour to kick-start an international-career. He would never again live in Hungary but always made sure that he was described as a Hungarian in later newspaper reports.

=== Stay in India ===
Schoefft was in India between 1838 and 1842, which left a long-term impact on his career as a painter. Schoefft may have been motivated to go to India based on a sense of adventure but also to find employment. In 1835, the artist travelled to India via Turkey.

While in Delhi, Schoefft painted portraits of Mughal royalty and officials, such as Bahadur Shah Zafar (1775–1862) and his two sons, Mirza Mughal (1828–1857) and Mirza Jawan Bakht (1841–1884). He also secretly painted the only authentic profile portrait of Sándor Kőrösi Csoma in Calcutta during a whist card game in secret. He also created art work depicting thugee prisoners whilst in Meerut.

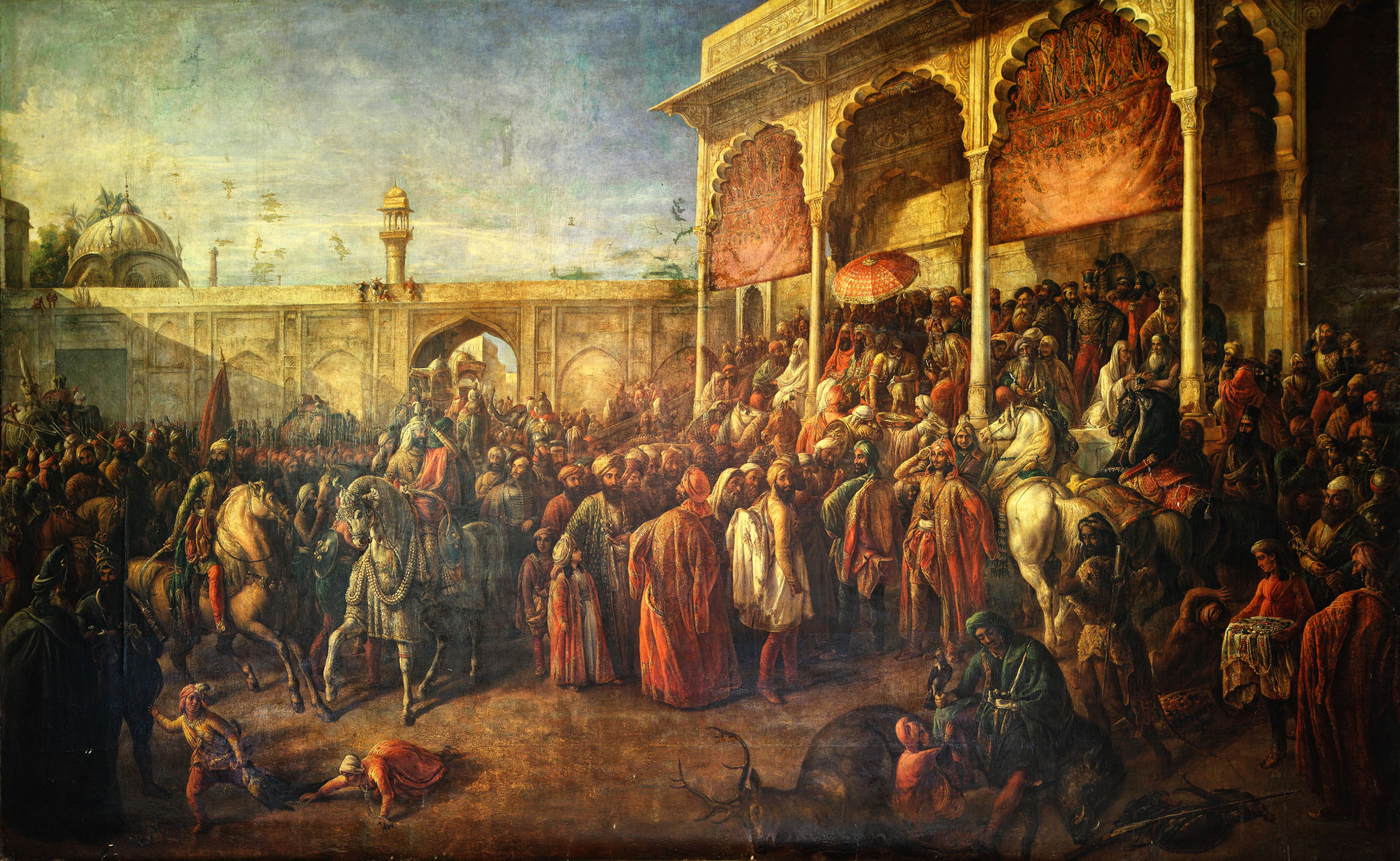
'The Court of Lahore', by August Schoefft, ca.1840's–1855, Vienna, after drawings made at Lahore, ca.1841–55

Schoefft eventually reached the Sikh kingdom's capital of Lahore in November 1841, where he found employment by the Sikh court as a royal painter in the court of Maharaja Sher Singh. Some sources state Schoefft had arrived in Lahore earlier on 14 November 1840. He was employed by the Sikh court for a year and a half and successfully secured a large number of commissions after gaining the trust of the local rulers. Schoefft had higher-prestige in the Sikh court as he painted in the European-style rather than the traditional Indian miniature-style. Schoefft faced dangers in the Punjab, as the area was not safe for European travellers, but European painters at that time, even second-rate ones, were in-demand in the Sikh court.

A few days after arriving in Lahore, Schoefft travelled to Amritsar, the sacred city of the Sikhs. There he sketched a picture of Maharaja Ranjit Singh, the late ruler of the kingdom, listening to a recitation of the Sikh scripture at the Golden Temple. However, some nearby bystanders mistook Schoefft's unused brush he was holding his mouth as a cigar, thus members of the Akali-Nihang sect confronted Schoefft, as smoking is a cardinal sin in the Sikh religion, with it being an especially egregious offence to do so in such close proximity to the sacred shrine. Schoefft was nearly lynched due to this mistaken perception and only managed to escape by getting to the house of Bhai Gurmukh Singh, his patron at the time.

During his one-year stay in Lahore as the guest of Dr. Martin Honigberger, the personal physician to the Sikh Royal Court and a fellow German speaker, he composed a series of sketches and notes on which he would rely for the development of much larger oil compositions upon his return to Europe.

M. Schoefft who has resided amongst us for some months and acquired considerable reputation as an artist is, we understand on the point of quitting Calcutta on a journey to Lahore. On his way thither, M. Schoefft propoes to halt at Moorshedabad, Monghyr, Patna, Dinapore, Benares, Allahabad, Lucknow, Cawnpore, Agra, Delhi, Meerut, Kurnaul etc. etc. and will, we believe be happy to be employed by the residents at the several stations in every way in which his talents can be made available. It should be stated that M. Schoefft is not merely a portrait painter. He has much skill in painting historical subjects, landscapes, costumes, etc. works with astonishing quickness and is, we thing more reasonable in his charge than any artist who has preceded him. — Calcutta Courier, June 13, 1840

Schoefft left Lahore in March 1842 and returned to Hungary for a short-term visit via Agra and Bombay.

=== Return to Europe and later life ===
On the way back to Europe, Schoefft made a detour to Egypt, where he painted a portrait of Khedive Muhammad Ali. Near the end of 1842 in Hungary, he dined with his patron, István Széchenyi, in Pest. During this time, Schoefft began to produce oil paintings after original sketches he drew whilst he was employed in the Sikh Empire. In 1848, he painted the Court of Lahore, a large 3 x 5 metre work which depicts many members of Ranjit Singh's court. Schoefft continued creating Orientalist artwork of India throughout his life.

Schoefft toured around Europe and also went on overseas trips to Mexico and the United States of America. Schoefft kept in-touch with the former Sikh ruling family, who had been deposed after British conquest of the Punjab in 1849 forced into exile in England. Schoefft commissioned portraits of the former Sikh royal family in 1873. Schoefft purchased a palazzo on the Canal Grande in Venice.

== Death ==
Schoefft died in London, England in 1888. He was apparently "impoverished, lonely and with a distraught mind" at the time of his death.

== Style ==
Schoefft's altarpiece compositions follow Baroque examples, most of them based on graphic models. The late Baroque style is mixed with Classicism in his paintings, while after 1825 Romantic Academicism appears in his works. His paintings were Orientalist, with his style remaining unaffected despite spending five years travelling the East. He painted in the Biedermeier style and his works are described as cheerful and pleasing. His Orientalist paintings were rich in intense colours.

== Collections ==
Surviving works of Schoefft can be found scattered around in Hungary, Croatia, Romania, and Serbia. The Hungarian National Museum has works in its collection, including portraits of the Schoefft family members, members of the public of Pest, royalty, and officials. Most of this works are in private collections and only resurface at auction, thus it is unknown how many surviving works by Schoefft exist. The largest collection is perhaps the ones in the Princess Bamba Collection purchased by the Pakistani government in 1961, consisting of eleven paintings by Schoefft that had originally been acquired by Maharaja Duleep Singh. Schoefft's paintings from the Princess Bamba Collection are held in Lahore today. There exists two portrait paintings of Maharaja Sher Singh by Schoefft, one in a private collection in London (Toor Collection) and the other is kept at the Lahore Museum.

== Exhibitions ==
In 1855, Schoefft opened a solo exhibition in Vienna, for which he published a catalogue. Schoefft's paintings were shown at the Salon in Paris and the Kunstverein in Vienna, and more than 70 of his paintings were exhibited in a café-restaurant at the 1862 London World's Fair. Schoefft also had several solo exhibitions in England. Schoefft's exhibition in Constantinople was held in the newly built Dolma Bakçe Theatre, part of the palace of the same name, was visited by Sultan Abdul-Medjid in 1859.

In 2023, there was a joint exhibition of the Hungarian National Museum and the Subotica City Museum in the framework of the Ars Sacra Festival on the Schoefft family, titled Schöfft 3 – Egy festőcsalád három generációja, which ran from 2023/09/16 – 2023/12/31.

== Legacy ==
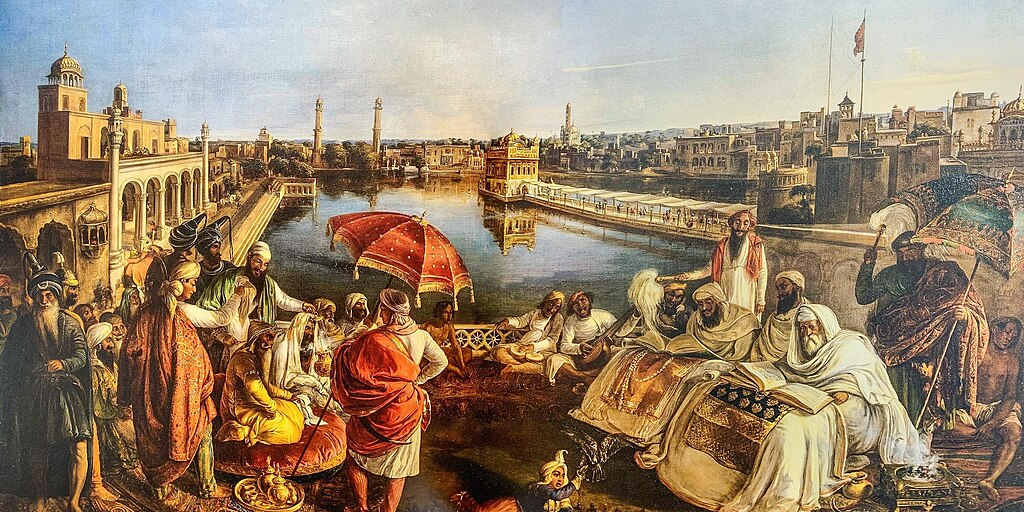
Painting of Maharaja Ranjit Singh at the Darbar Dahib, by August Schoefft, ca.1840's–1855 after a sketch made by Schoefft in Amritsar in 1841 (post-varnish removal)

During his time in Lahore, Schoefft expanded his oeuvre with various scenes and portraits of prominent members of the Sikh Royal Court; most notably the monumental work Maharaja Ranjit Singh at Darbar Sahib, and The Court of Lahore, which features over one-hundred portraits of courtiers. The historic painting received critical acclaim when it was exhibited at the Vienna Salon in 1855. Schoefft likely was popular and successful during his life as a painter because his works exhibited Orientalism, which appealed to people's desire for the exotic and foreign objects and people, which is characteristic of his Indian works. Although many of Schoefft portraits of Sikh nobles have been lost, the artist fortunately made copies of several for his own reference. Russian Prince Alexis Soltykoff, visiting Lahore in March 1842, tells of finding Schoefft's paintings in the palace treasures:

Five or six portraits in oils without frames, the work of Schoeft, the German painter who has returned to British India. There was also a portrait of the King covered with jewels and holding in his hand a scimitar straight and very broad at the point and a portrait of the chief minister, Raja Dhian Singh, a good looking man, on horseback and wearing that suit of armour which I have already described. The King who admires the armour wished to be painted in it also.

Despire reaching acclaim and repute during his lifetime due to his travels and exhibitions, after Schoefft's death in 1888, he became forgotten in Hungary and was only rediscovered in the 1960s as an important painter in Hungarian art history. Meanwhile, the Sikhs have always held him as an important painter in their history. His legacy may have been forgotten more readily in Hungary as comparatively few of his original works survive in Hungarian collections.

== Gallery ==
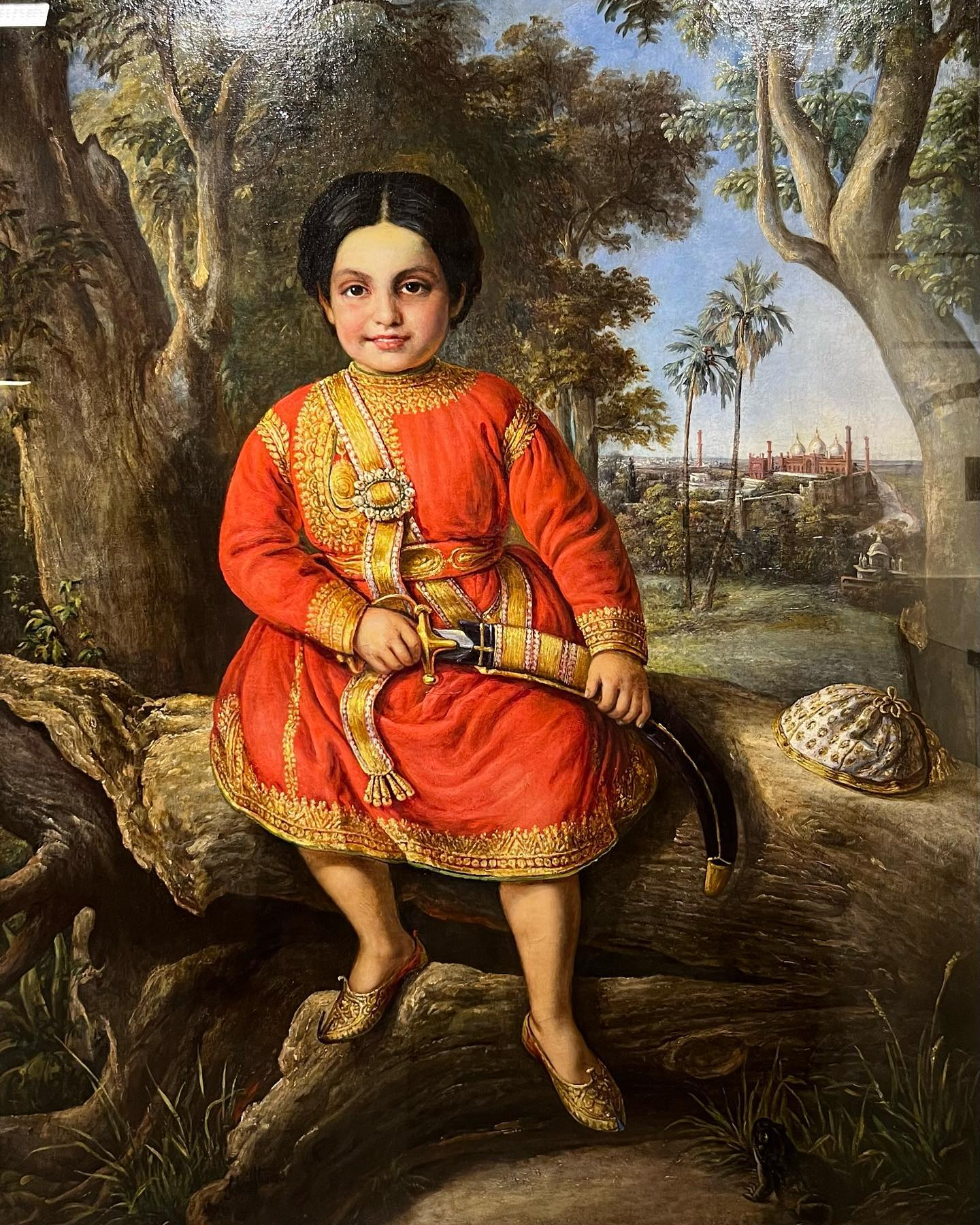
Prince Frederick Duleep Singh, oil on canvas, painted by August Schoefft in ca.1868–70, Princess Bamba Collection, Lahore Fort.

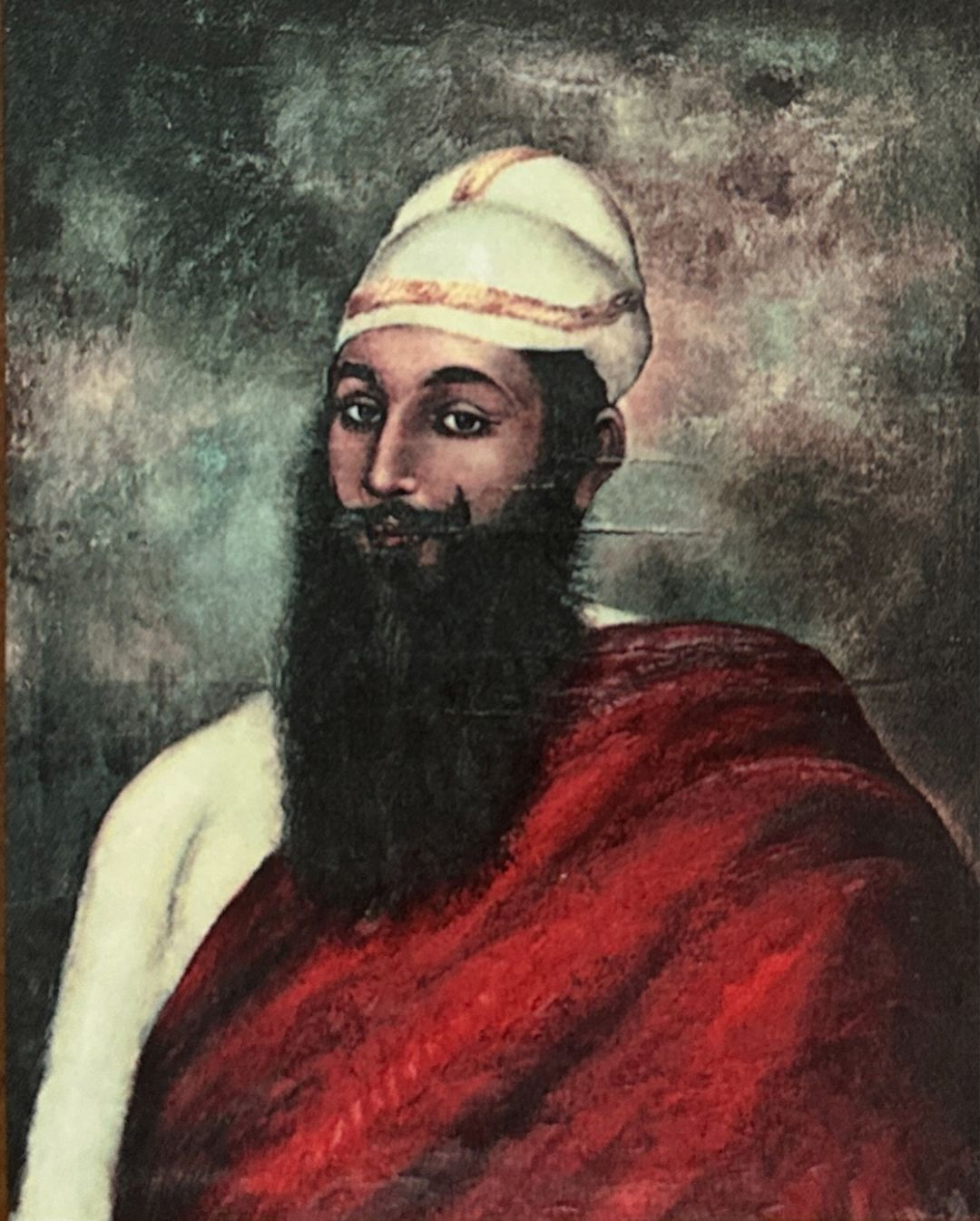
Painting of Bhai Gurmukh Singh Giani, attributed to August Schoefft, ca.1841–42.

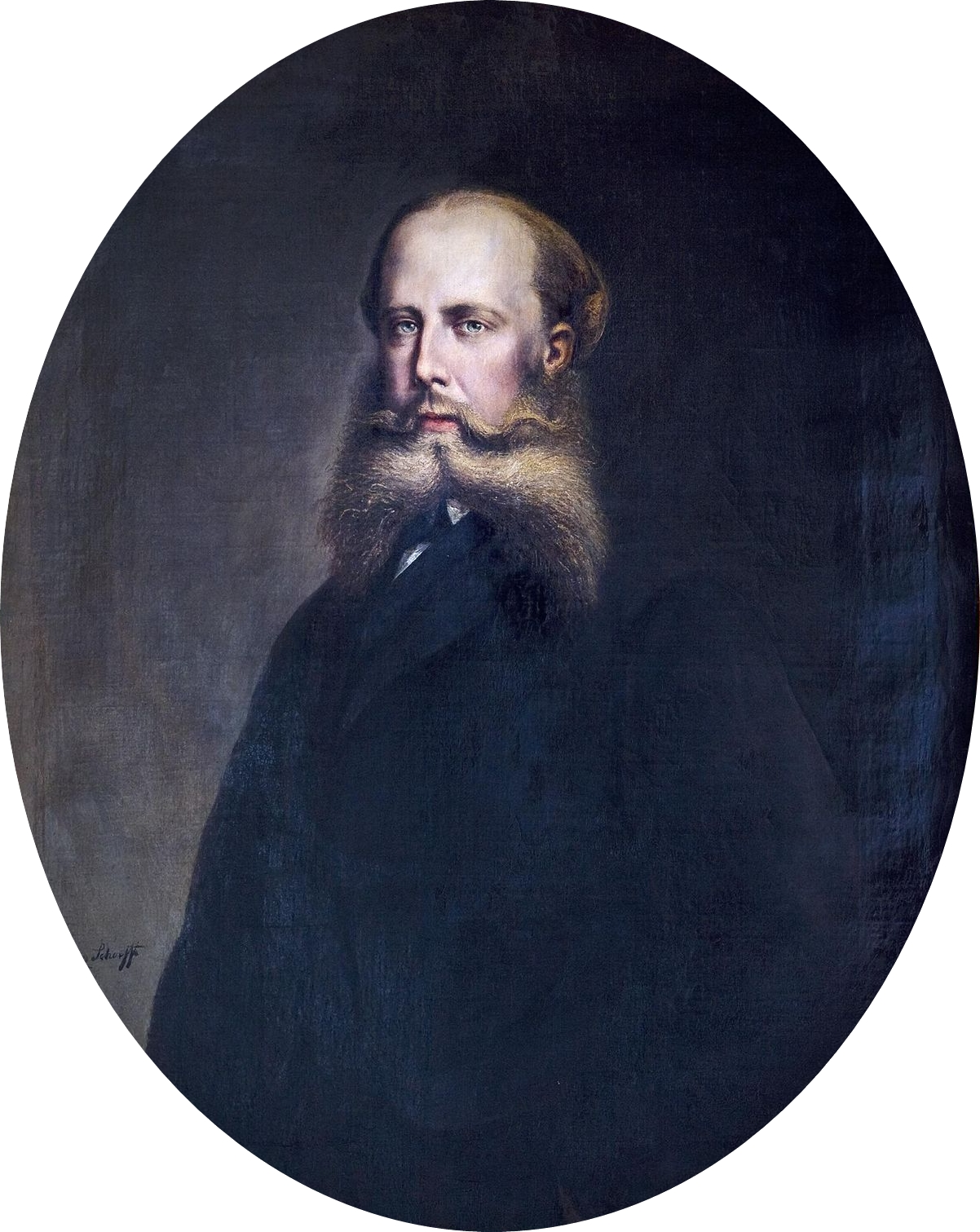
Kaiser Maximilian von Mexiko

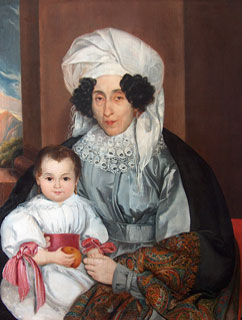
Portrait of a woman with a child

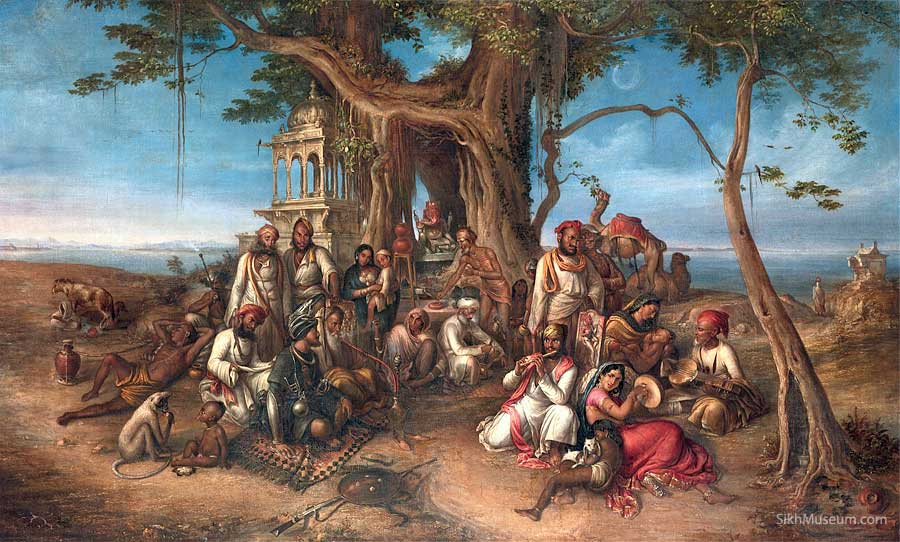
The Thugs of India - Halt at the Shrine of Ganesh, by August Schoefft, ca.1841

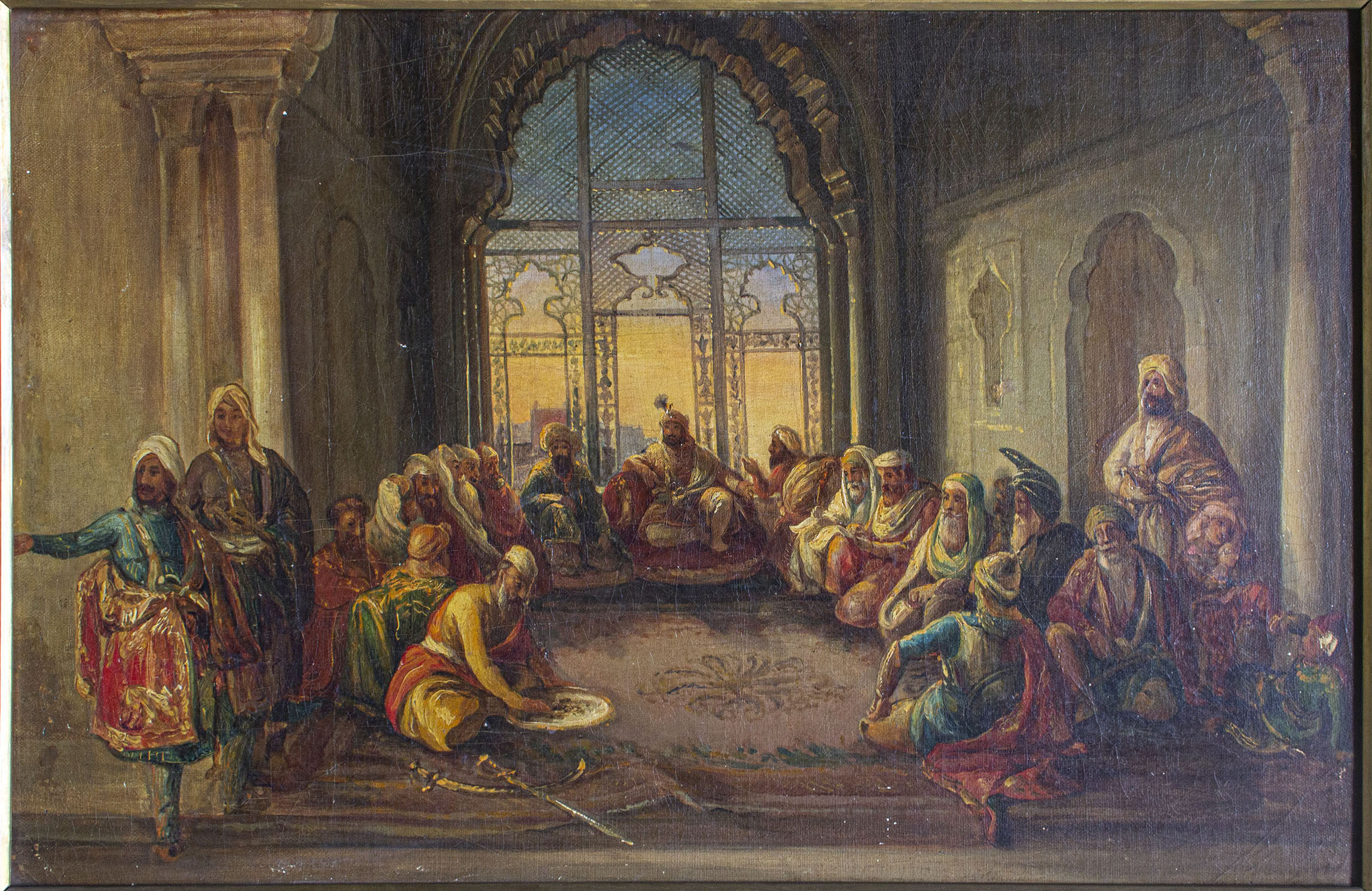
Maharaja Sher Singh seated, attended by his Council in the Lahore Fort, by August Schoefft, ca.1841
