= Peacock Throne =

Imperial throne of India (1635–1739)

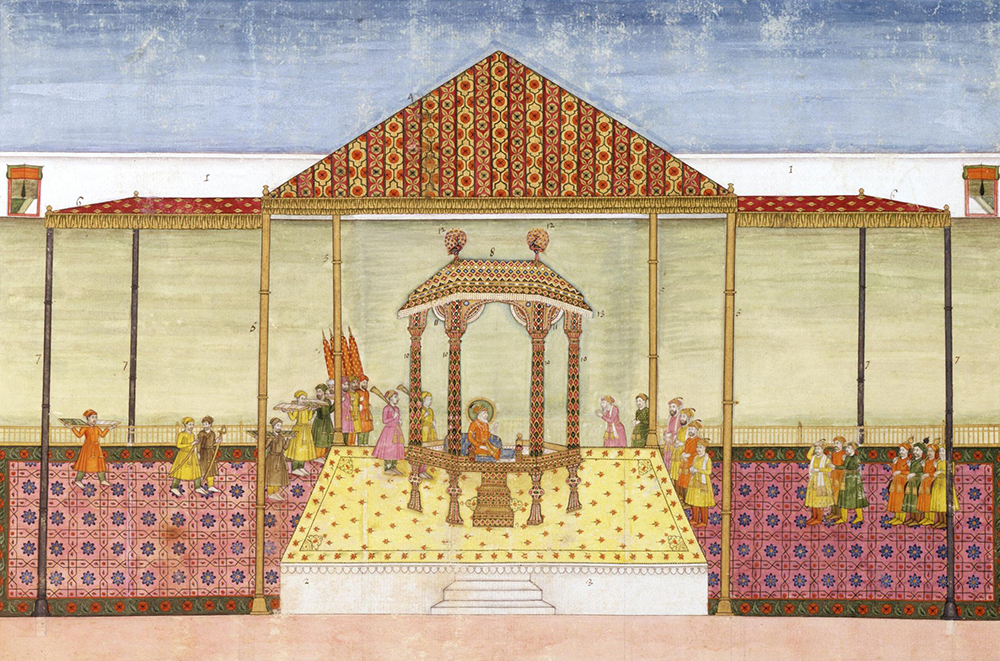
The Mughal Emperor Shah Jahan and his court

The Peacock Throne Persian: تخت طاووس, Takht-i Tāvūs) was the imperial throne of the Indian Mughal emperors, the Sunni Muslim rulers of the Mughal Empire from the Timurid dynasty, a dynasty or Barlās clan of Turco-Mongol origin. The throne was named after the two figures of peacocks displaying their train that were mounted on its canopy.

It was commissioned in the early 17th century by Emperor Shah Jahan and was located in the Diwan-i-Khas (Hall of Private Audiences, or Ministers' Room) in the Red Fort of Delhi. The original throne was taken as a war trophy by Nader Shah, in 1739 after his invasion of India. Its replacement disappeared during or soon after the Indian Rebellion of 1857.

== History ==
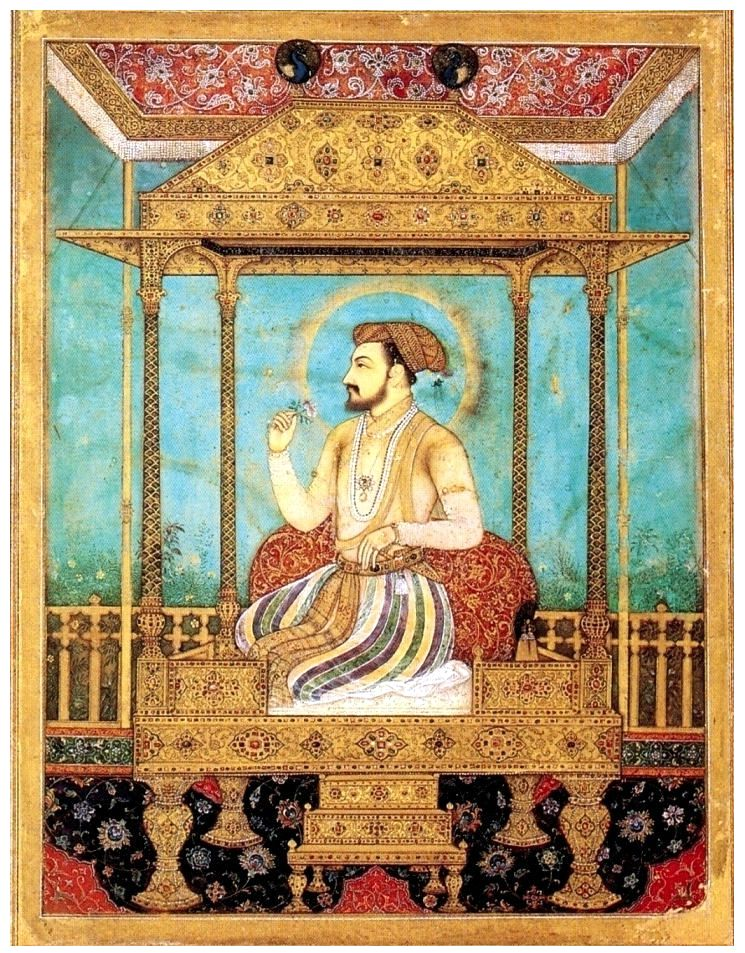
Shah Jahan seated on the Peacock Throne

Shah Jahan ruled in what is now considered the Golden Age of the vast Mughal Empire, which covered almost all of the Indian subcontinent. He ruled from the newly constructed capital of Shahjahanabad. The emperor was the focus around which everything else revolved, giving audiences and receiving petitioners. The ruler's court was to be a mirror image of paradise on earth, in the very center of the empire, and such a ruler would be worthy of a Throne of Solomon (تختِ سليمان, Takht-e-Sulaiman) to underscore his position as a just king. Like Solomon's throne, the Peacock Throne was to be covered in gold and jewels, with steps leading up to it, with the ruler floating above the ground and closer to heaven. Said Gilani and his workers from the imperial goldsmiths' department were commissioned to construct this new throne. It took seven years to complete. Large amounts of solid gold, precious stones, and pearls were used, creating a masterful piece of Mughal artistry that was unsurpassed before or after its creation. It was an opulent indulgence that could only be seen by a few courtiers, aristocrats, and visiting dignitaries. The throne was, even by Golden Age Mughal standards, supremely extravagant, costing twice as much as the construction of the Taj Mahal.

The appearance of this new throne was in stark contrast to the older throne of Jahangir, a large rectangular slab of engraved black basalt constructed in the early 1600s, used by the father of Shah Jahan.

The new throne was not initially given the name by which it became known. It was known as the "Jeweled Throne" or "Ornamented Throne" (Takht-Murassa). It received its name from later historians because of the peacock statues featured on it.

The Peacock Throne was inaugurated in a triumphant ceremony on 22 March 1635, the formal seventh anniversary of Shah Jahan's accession. The date was chosen by astrologers and was doubly auspicious, since it coincided exactly with Eid al-Fitr, the end of Ramadan, and Nowruz, the Persian New Year. The emperor and the court were returning from Kashmir, and it was determined that the third day of Nowruz would be the most auspicious day for him to enter the capital and take his seat on the throne.

Muhammad Qudsi, the emperor's favourite poet, was chosen to compose twenty verses inscribed in emerald and green enamel on the throne. He praised the matchless skill of the artisans, the "heaven-depleting grandeur" of its gold and jewels, and included the date in the letters of the phrase "the throne of the just king".

Poet Abu-Talib Kalim was given six pieces of gold for each verse in his poem of sixty-three couplets.

The emperor summoned master goldsmith Said Gilani and showered him with honours, including his weight in gold coins and the title "Peerless Master" (Bibadal Khan). Gilani produced a poem of 134 couplets, filled with chronograms, the first twelve couplets giving the date of the emperor's birth, the following thirty-two the date of his first coronation, then ninety couplets giving the date of the throne's inauguration.

Towards India he turned his reins quickly and went in all glory,

Driving like the blowing wind, dapple-grey steed swift as lightning.
With bounty and liberality, he returned to the capital;
Round his stirrups were the heavens and angels round his reins.
A thousand thanks! The beauty of the world has revived

With the early glory of the throne of multi-coloured gems.

After Shah Jahan's death, his son Aurangzeb, who had the regnal name of Alamgir, ascended the Peacock Throne. Aurangzeb was the last of the strong Mughal emperors. After he died in 1707, his son Bahadur Shah I reigned from 1707 to 1712. Bahadur Shah I could keep the empire stable by maintaining a relaxed religious policy; however, after his death, the empire declined. A period of political instability, military defeats, and court intrigues led to a succession of weak emperors: Jahandar Shah ruled for one year from 1712 to 1713, Farrukhsiyar from 1713 to 1719, Rafi ud-Darajat and Shah Jahan II only for a couple of months in 1719. By the time Muhammad Shah came to power, Mughal power was seriously declining, and the empire was vulnerable. Nevertheless, under the generous patronage of Muhammad Shah, the court at Delhi became again a beacon of the arts and culture. Administrative reforms could not, however, stop the later Mughal-Maratha Wars, which significantly sapped the imperial forces. It was only a question of time until forces from neighbouring Persia saw their chance to invade.

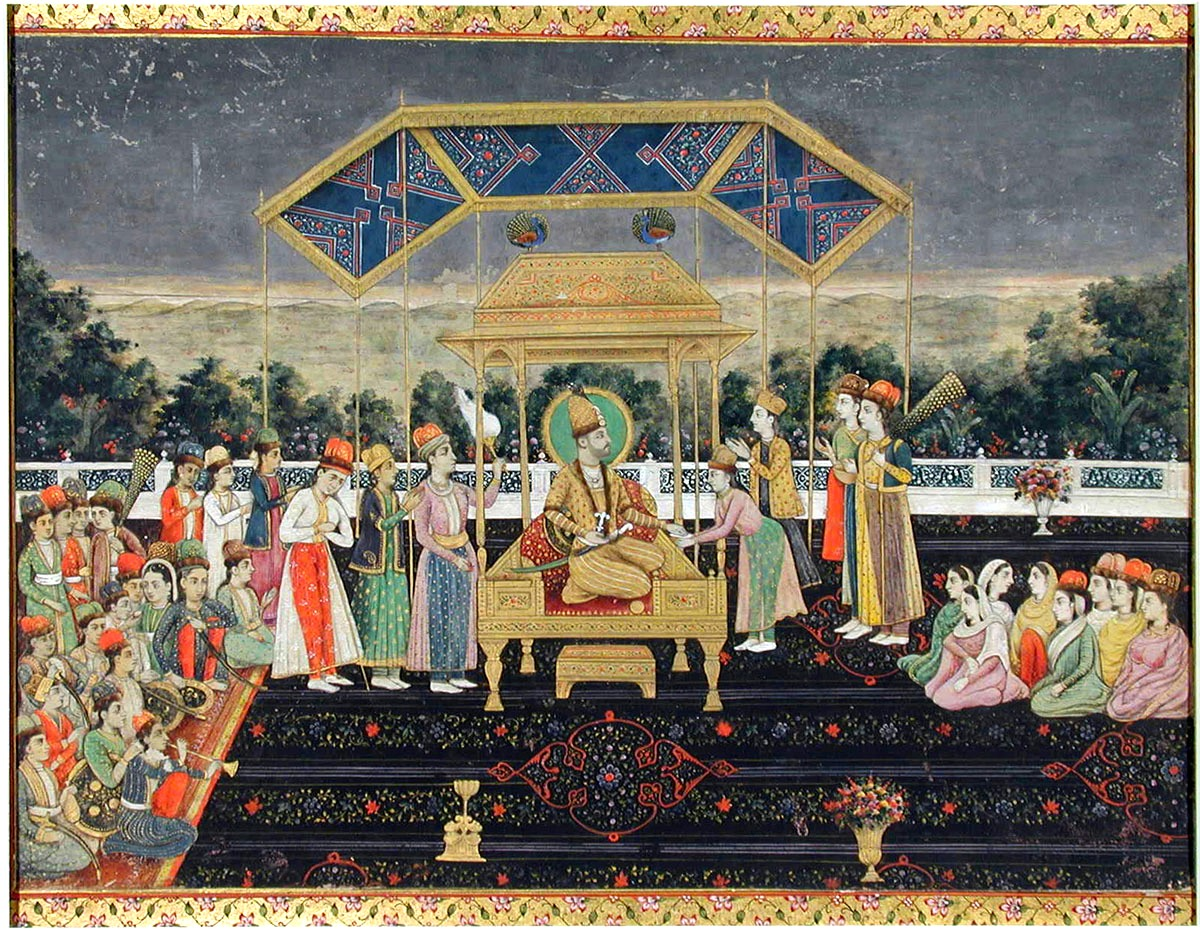
The Persian king Nader Shah seated upon the Peacock Throne with members of the court, after his victory at the Battle of Karnal

Nader Shah's invasion of the Mughal Empire culminated in the Battle of Karnal, on 13 February 1739, and the defeat of Muhammad Shah. Nader Shah entered Delhi and sacked the city, in the course of which tens of thousands of inhabitants were massacred. Persian troops left Delhi at the beginning of May 1739, taking with them the throne as a war trophy. Their treasure haul amounted to a considerable reduction in Mughal wealth and an irreplaceable loss of cultural artefacts. Among the known precious stones that Nadir Shah looted were the Akbar Shah, Great Mughal, Great Table, Koh-i-Noor, and Shah diamonds, as well as the Samarian spinel and the Timur Ruby. These stones were either part of the Peacock Throne or were in possession of the Mughal emperors. The Akbar Shah Diamond was said to form one of the eyes of a peacock, as did the Koh-i-Noor. The Shah diamond was described by Jean-Baptiste Tavernier as being on the side of the throne. Many of these stones ended up becoming part of the Persian crown jewels and, later, the British crown jewels as a result of Great Britain's colonial expansion into the region. When Nader Shah was assassinated by his officers on 19 June 1747, the throne disappeared, most probably being dismantled or destroyed for its valuables, in the ensuing chaos. One of the unsubstantiated rumours claimed the throne was given to the Ottoman Sultan, although this could have been a minor throne produced in Persia and given as a gift.

The Persian emperor Fath-Ali Shah Qajar commissioned the Sun Throne to be constructed in the early 19th century. The Sun Throne is, from the same tradition as the Peacock Throne, in the shape of a platform. Some rumours claim without evidence that parts of the original Peacock Throne were used in its construction. The Sun Throne was also called the Peacock throne on the occasion of Fath-Ali Shah's marriage to Tavus Khanum (lit. 'Lady Peacock'). Therefore, this throne has sometimes been erroneously mistaken for the older Mughal Throne of the same name. The Peacock Throne became a term the West later appropriated as a metonym for the Persian monarchy. No structural parts proven to be of the Mughal Peacock Throne survived. Only some of the diamonds and precious stones attributed to it have survived and been re-worked.

A Sikh legend has it that a rectangular stone slab measuring 6 feet (1.8 m) by 4 feet (1.2 m) by 9 inches (230 mm) was uprooted, enchained, and brought by Ramgarhia Misl chief Jassa Singh Ramgarhia to Ramgarhia Bunga, in Amritsar, after the capture of the Red Fort by the combined Dal Khalsa forces of Jassa Singh Ahluwalia, Jassa Singh Ramgarhia and Baghel Singh in 1783, as war booty. However, that this stone pedestal does indeed come from the Peacock Throne has not been independently corroborated by scientists and historians.

A replacement throne resembling the original was probably constructed for the Mughal emperor after the Persian invasion. The throne was located on the eastern side of the Divan-i-Khas, towards the windows. This throne, however, was also lost, possibly during or after the Indian Rebellion of 1857 and the subsequent looting and partial destruction of the Red Fort by the British. The marble pedestal on which it rested has survived and can still be seen today.

In 1908, The New York Times reported that Caspar Purdon Clarke, Director of the Metropolitan Museum of Art, obtained what was purported to be a marble leg from the pedestal of the throne. Although mentioned in the 1908 annual report, the status of this pedestal leg remains unknown. There is another marble leg in the Victoria and Albert Museum in London. Where precisely these two pedestal legs originate, and if they are connected to the Peacock Throne, remains unclear.

== Descriptions ==
The contemporary descriptions that are known today of Shah Jahan's throne are from the Mughal historians Abdul Hamid Lahori and Inayat Khan, and the French travellers François Bernier and Jean-Baptiste Tavernier. No known painting of the throne that would match their descriptions exists.

=== By Abdul Hamid Lahori ===
Abdul Hamid Lahori (d. 1654) describes, in his Padshahnama, the construction of the throne:

In the course of years many valuable gems had come into the Imperial jewel-house, each one of which might serve as an ear-drop for Venus, or would adorn the girdle of the Sun. Upon the accession of the Emperor, it occurred to his mind that, in the opinion of far-seeing men, the acquisition of such rare jewels and the keeping of such wonderful brilliants can only render one service, that of adorning the throne of empire. They ought therefore, to be put to such a use, that beholders might share in and benefit by their splendour, and that Majesty might shine with increased brilliancy.

It was accordingly ordered that, in addition to the jewels in the Imperial jewel-house, rubies, garnets, diamonds, rich pearls and emeralds, to the value of 200 lacs of rupees, should be brought for the inspection of the Emperor, and that they, with some exquisite jewels of great weight, exceeding 50,000 miskals, and worth eighty-six lacs of rupees, having been carefully selected, should be handed over to Bebadal Khan, the superintendent of the goldsmith's department. There was also to be given to him one lakh of tolas of pure gold, equal to 250,000 miskals in weight and fourteen lakhs of rupees in value.

The throne was to be three gaz in length, two and a half in breadth, and five in height, and was to be set with the above-mentioned jewels. The outside of the canopy was to be of enamel work with occasional gems, the inside was to be thickly set with rubies, garnets, and other jewels, and it was to be supported by twelve emerald columns. On the top of each pillar there were to be two peacocks thick set with gems, and between each two peacocks a tree set with rubies and diamonds, emeralds and pearls. The ascent was to consist of three steps set with jewels of fine water.

This throne was completed in the course of seven years at a cost of 100 lakhs [10,000,000] of rupees. Of the eleven jeweled recesses (takhta) formed around it for cushions, the middle one, intended for the seat of the Emperor, cost ten lakhs of rupees. Among the jewels set in this recess was a ruby worth a lac of rupees, with Shah 'Abbas, the king of Iran, had presented to the late Emperor Jahangir, who sent it to his present Majesty, the Sahib Kiran-i sani, when he accomplished the conquest of the Dakhin.

The names of Sahib-kiran (Timur), Mir Shah Rukh, and Mirza Ulugh Beg were engraved on it. When in course of time it came into the possession of Shah 'Abbas, his name was added; and when Jahangir obtained it, he added the name of himself and of his father. Now it received the addition of the name of his most gracious Majesty Shah Jahan. By command of the Emperor, the following masnawi, by Haji Muhammad Jan, the final verse of which contains the date, was placed upon the inside of the canopy in letters of green enamel.

On his return to Agra, the Emperor held a court, sat for the first time on his throne.

=== By Inayat Khan ===
The following is the account given of the throne in the Shahjahannama of Inayat Khan:

The Nauroz of the year 1044 fell on the 'Id-i fitr, when His Majesty was to take his seat on the new jeweled throne. This gorgeous structure, with a canopy supported on twelve pillars, measured three yards and a half in length, two and a half in breadth, and five in height, from the flight of steps to the overhanging dome. On his Majesty's accession to the throne, he had commanded that eighty-six lakhs worth of gems and precious stones, and a diamond worth fourteen lakhs, which together make a crore of rupees as money is reckoned in Hindustan, should be used in its decoration. It was completed in seven years, and among the precious stones was a ruby worth a lakh of rupees that Shah 'Abbas Safavi had sent to the late Emperor, on which were inscribed the names of the great Timur Sahih-Kiran, etc.

=== By François Bernier ===
The French physician and traveller François Bernier described, in his Travels in the Mogul Empire A.D. 1656–1668, the throne in the Diwan-i-Khas:

The King appeared seated upon his throne, at the end of the great hall, in the most magnificent attire. His vest was of white and delicately flowered satin, with a silk and gold embroidery of the finest texture. The turban, of gold cloth, had an aigrette whose base was composed of diamonds of an extraordinary size and value, besides an Oriental topaz, which may be pronounced unparalleled, exhibiting a lustre like the sun. A necklace of immense pearls, suspended from his neck, reached to the stomach, in the same manner as many of the Gentiles wear their strings of beads.

The throne was supported by six massive feet, said to be of solid gold, sprinkled over with rubies, emeralds, and diamonds. I cannot tell you with accuracy the number or value of this vast collection of precious stones, because no person may approach sufficiently near to reckon them, or judge of their water and clearness; but I can assure you that there is a confusion of diamonds, as well as other jewels, and that the throne, to the best of my recollection, is valued at four crores of Rupees. I observed elsewhere that a lakh is one hundred thousand rupees, and that a crore is a hundred lakh; so that the throne is estimated at forty millions of rupees, worth sixty millions of pounds [livres] or thereabouts. It was constructed by Shah Jahan, the father of Aurangzeb, for the purpose of displaying the immense quantity of precious stones accumulated successively in the treasury from the spoils of ancient Rajas and Patans, and the annual presents to the Monarch, which every Omrah is bound to make on certain festivals. The construction and workmanship of the throne are not worthy of the materials; but two peacocks, covered with jewels and pearls, are well conceived and executed. They were made by a workman of astonishing powers, a Frenchman by birth, named..... who, after defrauding several of the Princes of Europe, by means of false gems, which he fabricated with peculiar skill, sought refuge in the Great Mogul's court, where he made his fortune.

At the foot of the throne were assembled all the Omralis, in splendid apparel, upon a platform surrounded by a silver railing, and covered by a spacious canopy of brocade with deep fringes of gold. The pillars of the hall were hung with brocades of a gold ground, and flowered satin canopies were raised over the whole expanse of the extensive apartment fastened with red silken cords, from which were suspended large tassels of silk and gold. The floor was covered entirely with carpets of the richest silk, of immense length and breadth.

=== By Jean-Baptiste Tavernier ===
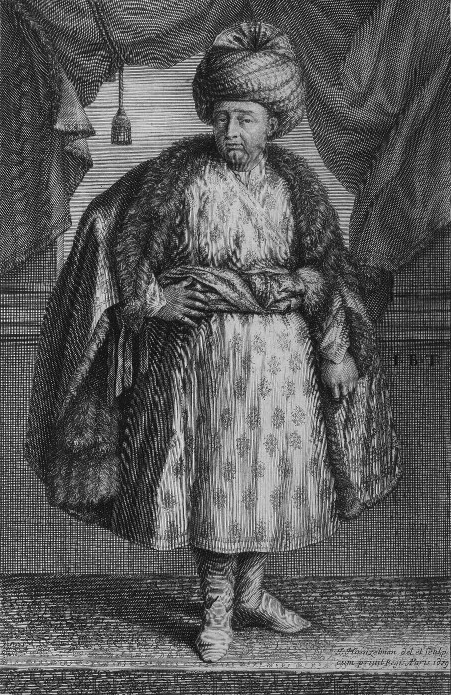
Portrait of Jean-Baptiste Tavernier, as a traveller wearing Mughal dress, from his Les Six Voyages, published in 1679

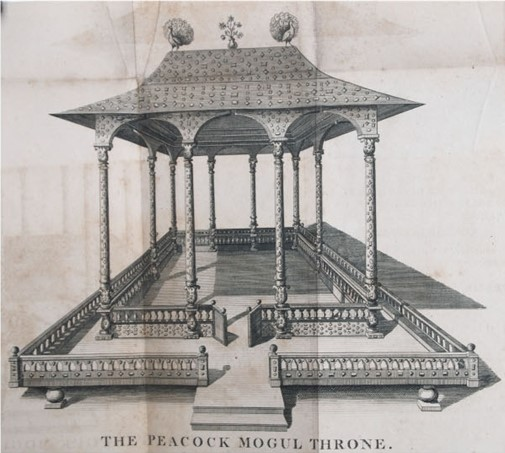
The throne, as seen by Baron Tavernier, at the end of the 16th century, according to Thomas Maurice, published in 1794. Tavernier speaks of one peacock only, but two appear in this print. which was drawn at Delhi, by a European artist in the train of Nadir Shah who plundered it in 1739.

The French jeweler Jean-Baptiste Tavernier made his sixth voyage to India between 1663 and 1668. It was his great privilege to be invited by emperor Aurangzeb himself to visit the court at Delhi, where he remained as Aurangzeb's guest for two months, from 12 September 1665 to 11 November 1665.

Tavernier was invited so the emperor could inspect the jewels he had brought from the West, intending to purchase them. During this visit, Tavernier sold several jewels to the emperor and the emperor's uncle, Jafar Khan, and established a close relationship with the emperor, leading to a more extended stay. Tavernier was invited to stay until the conclusion of the emperor's annual birthday celebrations. During that time, he had the opportunity to visit the Red Fort and inspect the Peacock Throne. He was also allowed to inspect the valuable jewels and stones belonging to the emperor but could not see those still kept by Aurangzeb's father, Shah Jahan, who was imprisoned at Agra Fort. In January 1666, only a few months after Tavernier's stay, Shah Jahan died, and Aurangzeb claimed the remaining stones.

Tavernier gives a detailed description of the Peacock Throne in his book Les Six Voyages de J. B. Tavernier, published in 1676 in two volumes. The account of the throne appears in Chapter VIII of Volume II, in which he describes the preparations for the emperor's annual birthday festival and the court's magnificence. Tavernier is considered among the least reliable from a conventionally historical perspective.

Tavernier, however, describes seeing the throne in what is probably the Diwan-i-Am. One theory is that the throne was sometimes moved between the two halls, depending on the occasion. Tavernier also describes five other thrones in the Diwan-i-Khas.

== Discrepancies between descriptions of Lahori and Tavernier ==
The descriptions of Lahori, from before 1648, and Tavernier's, published in 1676, are generally in broad agreement on the essential features of the thrones, such as its rectangular shape, standing on four legs at its corners, the 12 columns on which the canopy rests, and the type of gemstones embedded on the throne, such as balas rubies, emeralds, pearls, diamonds, and other coloured stones. There are, however, some significant differences between the two descriptions:

- Lahori's account of the throne, based on the language used, could describe the projected design. Tavernier's account of the throne seems to be an eyewitness observation during his 1665 visit to the Red Fort. It could be that there were differences between the projected and final designs of the throne that Shah Jahān ascended for the first time on 12 March 1635.
- According to Lahori, the throne was to have a length of 3 yards (9 feet) and a breadth of 2½ yards (7½ feet). Tavernier, however, gives the length at 6 feet and breadth of 4 feet. Lahori describes the height as 5 yards (15 feet), but Tavernier's account does not mention its total height. Only the height of the four legs at the corners, about 2 feet, is mentioned.
- Lahori describes the canopy as being supported by 12 emerald columns; Tavernier describes 12 columns surrounded by and embedded with rows of pearls, which were round and of fine water and weighed 6 to 10 carats each. He thinks these pearls were, in fact, the most costly and precious aspect of the throne.
- A significant difference is the position of the eponymous peacock statues. Lahori states that on the top of each pillar, there were to be two peacocks, thick-set with gems, and between every two peacocks, a tree set with rubies and diamonds, emeralds, and pearls. If the reference to "pillar" here means "column" there would be 24 peacocks right round the throne. Tavernier, however, saw only a single large peacock above the quadrangular-shaped, dome-like canopy, with an elevated tail embedded with blue sapphires and other coloured stones; the body of the peacock is made of gold inlaid with precious stones, having a large ruby in front of the breast, from which hung a pear-shaped pearl around 60 carats in weight. Apart from the single large peacock, Tavernier's account speaks of a large bouquet, representing many kinds of flowers, made of gold inlaid with precious stones, of the same height as the peacock, situated on either side of the peacock.
- According to Lahori, ascending the throne was by way of three steps, also set with jewels of fine water. Tavernier, however, describes four steps on the longer side of the throne embedded with the same types of gemstones used on the throne and with matching designs.

Apart from the significant differences between the two accounts given above, there are several details provided in Lahori's account that are not mentioned in Tavernier's, and vice versa.

=== Lahori's description ===
- Lahori's account mentions several historical diamonds that decorated the throne, such as the 186-carat Koh-i-Noor diamond, the 95-carat Akbar Shah diamond, the 88.77-carat Shah diamond, and the 83-carat Jahangir diamond, apart from the 352.50-carat Timur Ruby, the third-largest balas ruby in the world. Tavernier makes no mention of these most precious stones. One explanation is that when Tavernier saw the throne in 1665, all these historical diamonds and the balas ruby were in the possession of Shah Jahan, who was under house arrest at the Fort in Agra. Shah Jahan died on 22 January 1666—two months after Tavernier left Delhi, and reached Bengal, during this, his sixth, and last, voyage to India—and his son and successor Aurangzeb was able to claim all these gems. Lahori's descriptions were made during the rule of Shah Jahan when all the gems were probably incorporated into the throne.
- According to Lahori, a twenty-couplet poem by Muhammad Qudsi praising Shah Jahan in emerald letters was embedded in the throne. Tavernier does not mention this in his account, either because of his inability to read and understand what was written or because Aurangzeb had ordered its removal.

=== Tavernier's description ===
Tavernier was allowed to inspect the throne and its jewels closely and wrote the most well-known detailed description.

- In his account, Tavernier gave details of the design in which the balas rubies, emeralds, diamonds, and pearls were arranged on the four horizontal bars connecting the four vertical legs, from which the 12 vertical columns supporting the canopy arose. A large cabochon-cut balas ruby was placed in the middle of each bar, surrounded by four emeralds forming a square cross. Smaller such square crosses were situated on either side of the central large cross, along the length of the bar, but arranged in such a way that while in one square cross, a balas ruby occupied the center, surrounded by four emeralds, in the next square cross, four balas rubies surrounded an emerald. The emeralds were table-cut, and the intervals between the emerald-and-ruby crosses were covered with diamonds, also table-cut and not exceeding 10 to 12 carats in weight.
- There were three cushions or pillows upon the throne. The one behind the emperor's back was large and round; the other two, placed at his sides, were flat. The cushions were also studded with gems.
- Tavernier mentioned some royal standards and weapons suspended from the throne, such as a mace, a sword, a round shield, a bow and quiver with arrows, all studded with gemstones.
- He counted the number of large balas rubies and emeralds on the throne. Accordingly, there were 108 large balas rubies on the throne, all cabochon-cut, the smallest weighing around 100 carats and the largest over 200 carats in weight. He counted 116 large emeralds on the throne, all of excellent colour but with many flaws (a characteristic feature of emeralds), the smallest weighing around 30 carats and the largest approximately 60 carats.
- The underside of the canopy was covered with diamonds and pearls, with a fringe of pearls all round.
- On the side of the throne facing the court was suspended a diamond of 80 to 90 carats in weight, with rubies and emeralds surrounding it. When the Emperor was seated on the throne, this suspended arrangement of jewels was in full view before him.
- Tavernier then wrote about two large gem-studded royal umbrellas, which were not part of the throne but were placed on either side at a distance of 4 feet from it. The central stems of these umbrellas, 7 to 8 feet long, were covered with diamonds, rubies, and pearls. The umbrella cloth was made of red velvet and embroidered and fringed all round with pearls. The height of these umbrellas might indicate the throne's height, which was probably the same height. Thus, the height of the throne would have been around 7 to 10 feet.

== Later Peacock Thrones ==
After Nader Shah took the original, another throne was made for the Mughal emperor. Along with the Peacock Throne, Nader had also taken the fabulous Koh-i Noor and Darya-i Noor diamonds to Persia, where some became part of the Persian crown jewels, and others were sold to the Ottomans. The plunder taken by Nader was so great that he stopped taxation for three years. The bottom half of the Peacock Throne might have been converted into the Sun Throne, also a part of the Persian crown jewels. Various 19th-century Indian paintings of this later throne exist. It was located in the Diwan-i-Khas and might have been smaller than the original. However, the appearance would have been similar, based on either the original plans or from memory and eyewitness accounts. The replacement throne was made out of gold, or was gilded, and was studded with precious and semi-precious stones. Just like the original, it featured 12 columns. The columns carried a Bengali do-chala roof, which was graced with two peacock statues on the two ends, carrying pearl necklaces in their beaks and two peacocks at the top, also carrying pearl necklaces in their beaks. The two lower peacocks were in the center underneath a flower bouquet made of jewels or under a royal umbrella. A canopy of precious and colorful textiles and gold and silver threads protected this throne. The canopy was carried by four slender columns or beams made out of metal. Underneath the throne, colorful and precious carpets were laid out.

Later Shahs of Persia used the Naderi Throne, but they were sometimes referred to as holders of the “Peacock Throne”, in reference to the historical throne. This was meant to be symbolic rather than a reference to the actual piece of furniture.

Inspired by the legend of the throne, King Ludwig II of Bavaria had a romanticized, contemporary interpretation of it built in the 1860s in the "Moorish Kiosk" in the park of his Linderhof Palace.

== Gallery of the later throne ==
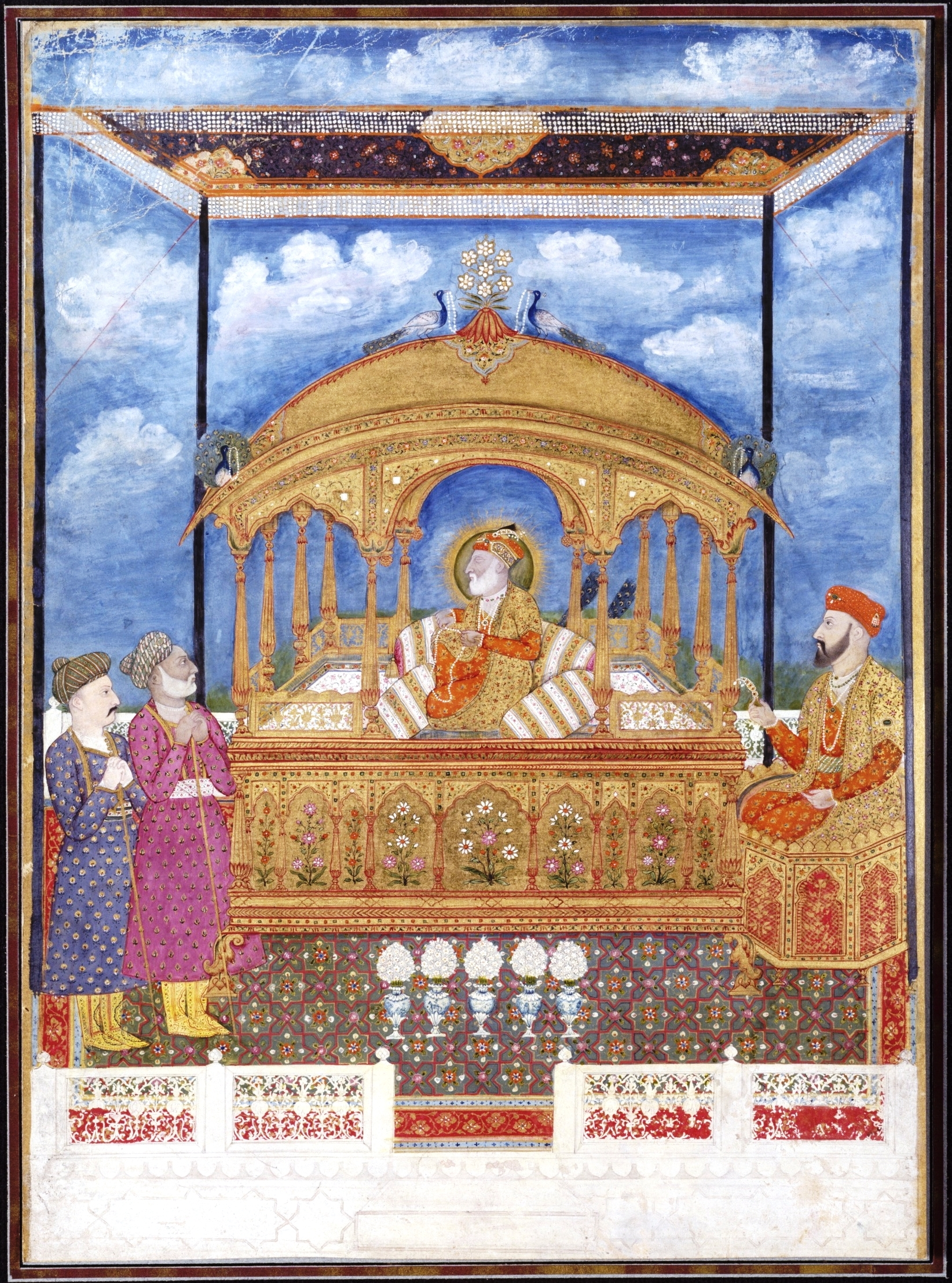
Shah Alam II seated on the throne, next to him the crown prince, circa 1800

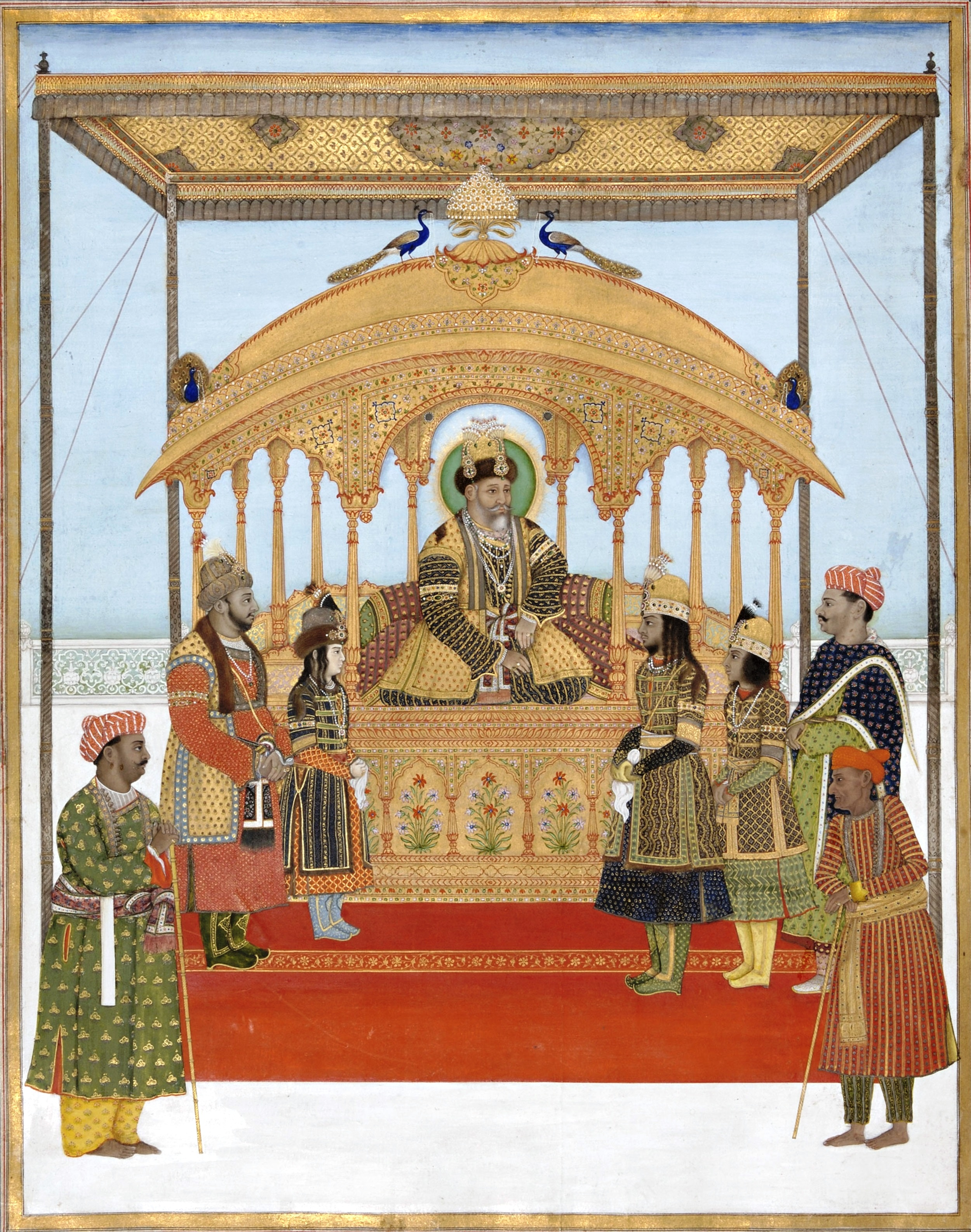
Akbar II seated on the throne, circa 1811

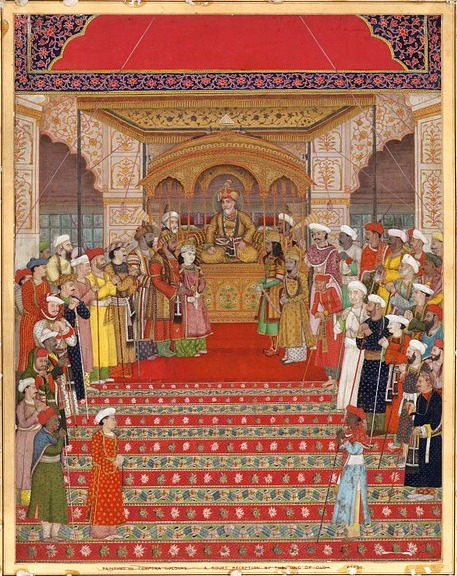
Akbar II in durbar (holding court) in the Diwan-i Khas at the Red Fort, circa 1830

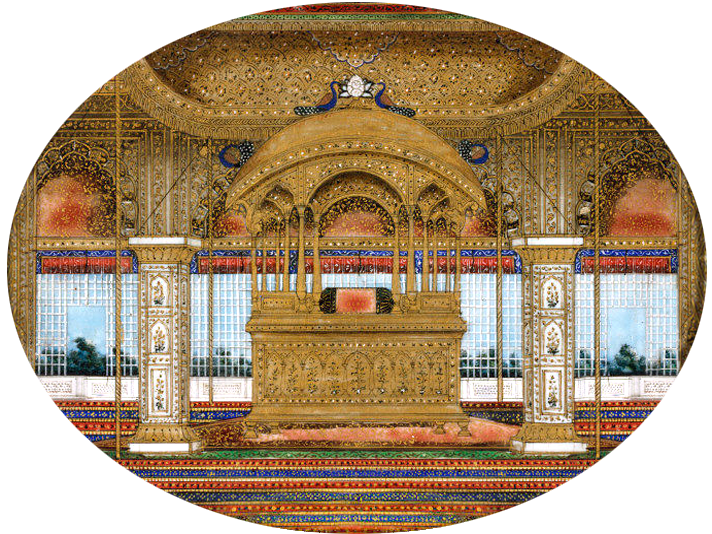
Painting of the later Peacock Throne in the Diwan-i-Khas of the Red Fort, around 1850

== See also ==
- Golden Throne (Mysore)
- Maharaja Ranjit Singh's throne
- Marble Throne
- Naderi Throne
- Sun Throne
- Throne of Jahangir
- Turquoise Throne
