= Diwan-i-Am =

Diwan-i-Am may refer to:

- Agra Fort#Diwan-i-Am
- Diwan-i-Am (Red Fort)

== See also ==
- Divan
