= Noor-ol-Ain =

One of the largest pink diamonds in the world

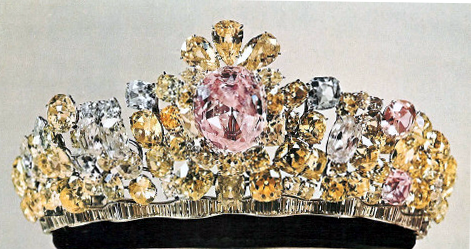
- The Noor-ol-Ain mounted in a tiara of the same name
- Weight: Around 60 carats (12 g)
- Color: Pale pink
- Cut: Oval brilliant
- Country of origin: India
- Mine of origin: Golconda
- Original owner: Kollur Mine
- Owner: Iranian National Jewels

The Noor-ol-Ain (Persian: نورالعین, lit. 'the light of the eye') is one of the largest pink diamonds in the world, and the centre piece of the tiara of the same name.

== History ==
The diamond is believed to have been recovered from the mines of Golconda, Hyderabad in India. It was first in possession with the nizam Abul Hasan Qutb Shah; later it was given as a peace offering to the Mughal emperor Aurangzeb when he defeated Qutb Shah in 1687 and after an eight-month Siege of Golconda. It was brought into the Iranian Imperial collection after Nader Shah of Iran looted Delhi in the 18th century.

The Noor-ol-Ain is believed to have once formed part of an even larger gem called the Great Table diamond. That larger diamond is thought to have been cut in two, with one section becoming the Noor-ol-Ain and the other the Daria-i-Noor diamond. Both of these pieces are part of the Iranian Crown Jewels.

== History of the tiara ==
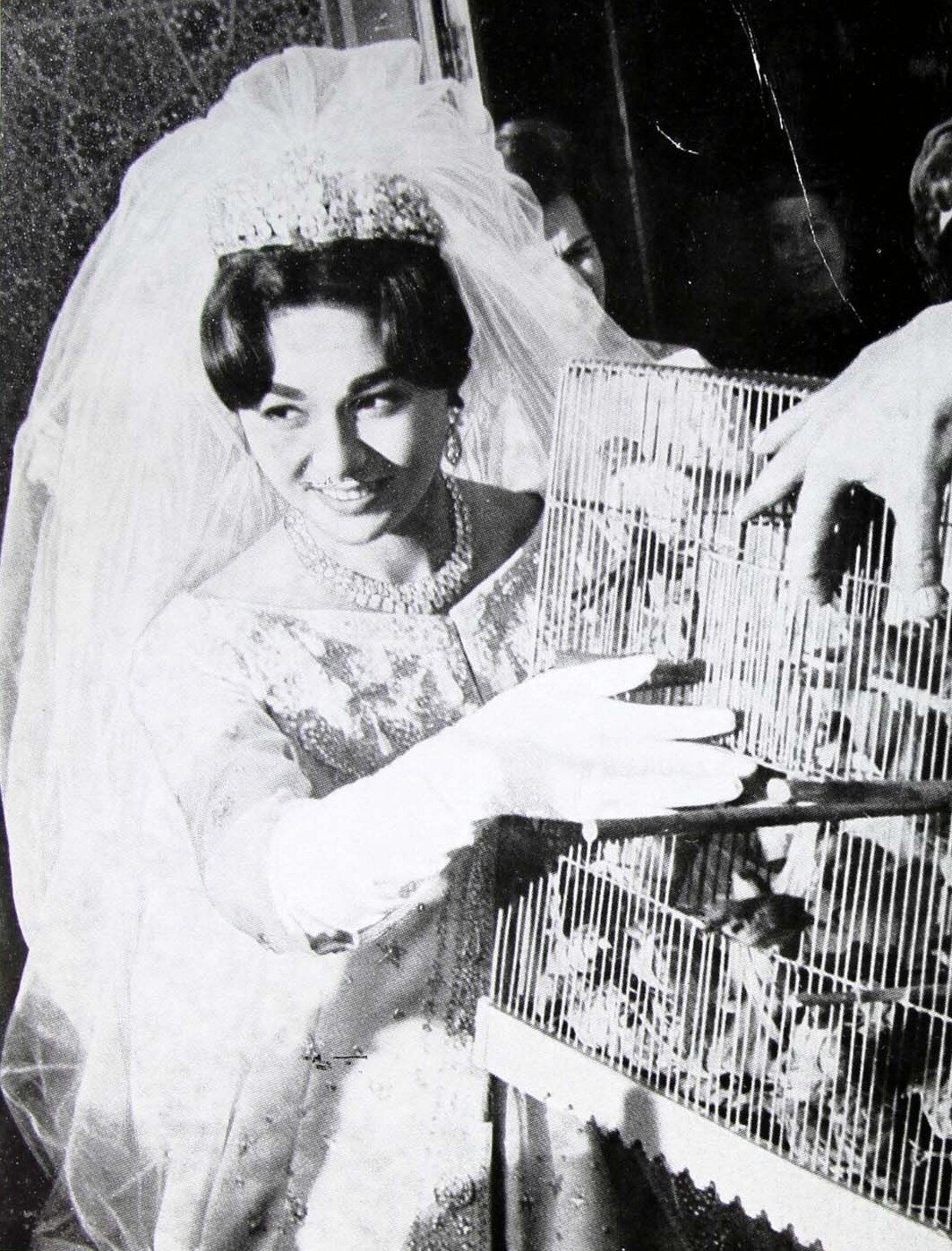
Empress Farah wearing the Noor-ol-Ain tiara at her wedding, 1959

The Noor-ol-Ain is the principal pink diamond mounted in a tiara of the same name made for Iranian Empress Farah Pahlavi's wedding to Shah Mohammad Reza Pahlavi in 1958. The tiara was designed by Harry Winston. It is a modern design, featuring 324 pink, yellow, and white diamonds set in platinum. It is said to weigh around 2 kg (4.4 lb). The tiara forms part of the Iranian crown jewels, held at the National Treasury of Iran in the Central Bank in Tehran.

It is a Type IIa diamond.

== Gallery ==
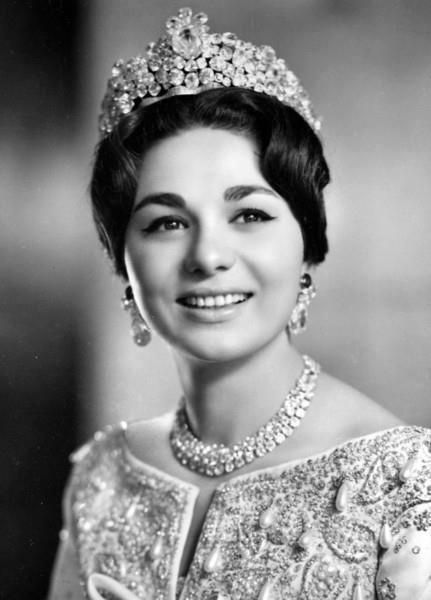
Empress Farah wearing the tiara, 1959

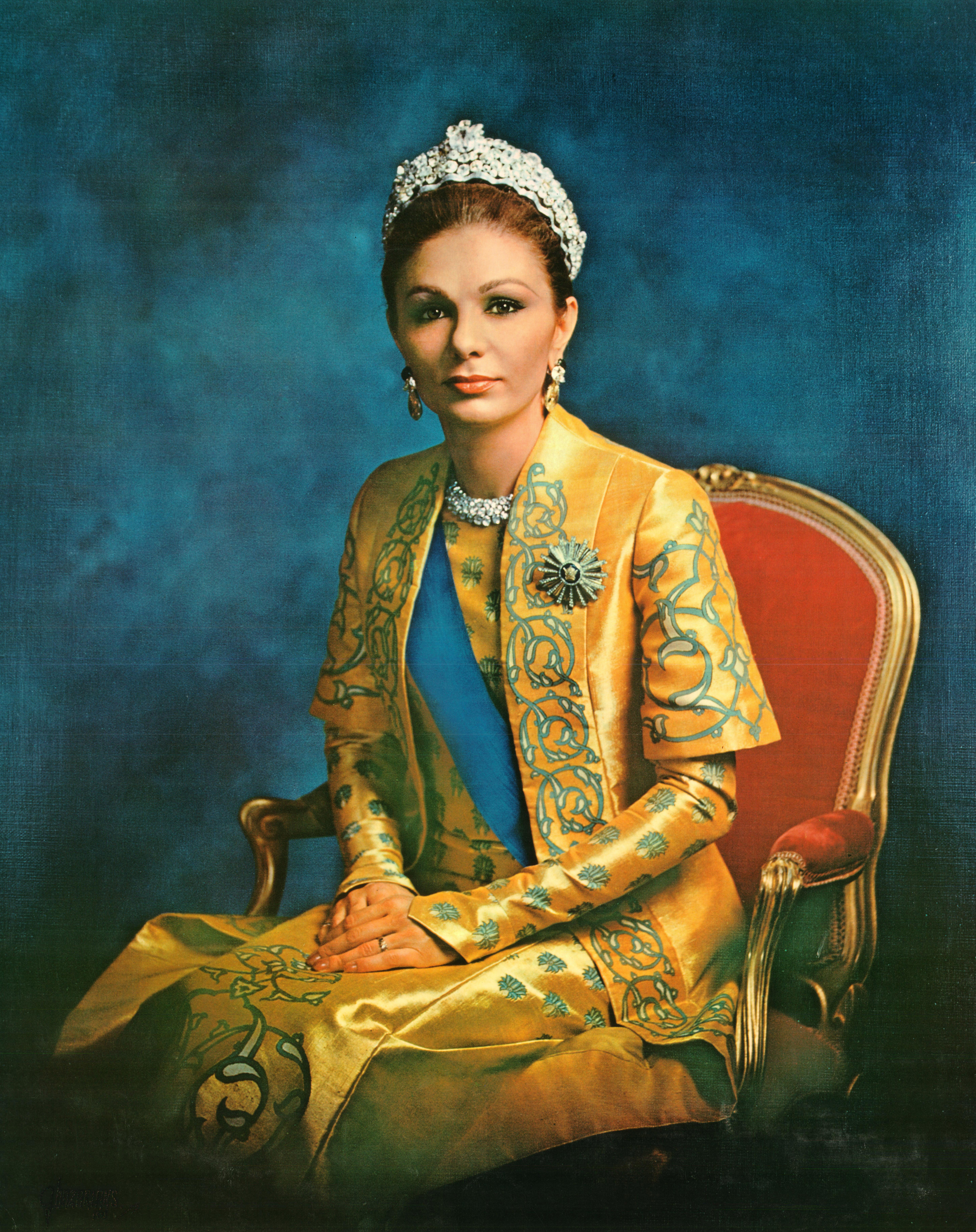
Official portrait of Empress Farah with the tiara, 1973

== See also ==
- Great Table diamond
- Koh-i-Noor diamond
- List of diamonds
- List of largest rough diamonds
