= Throne of Jahangir =

17th century Mughal throne

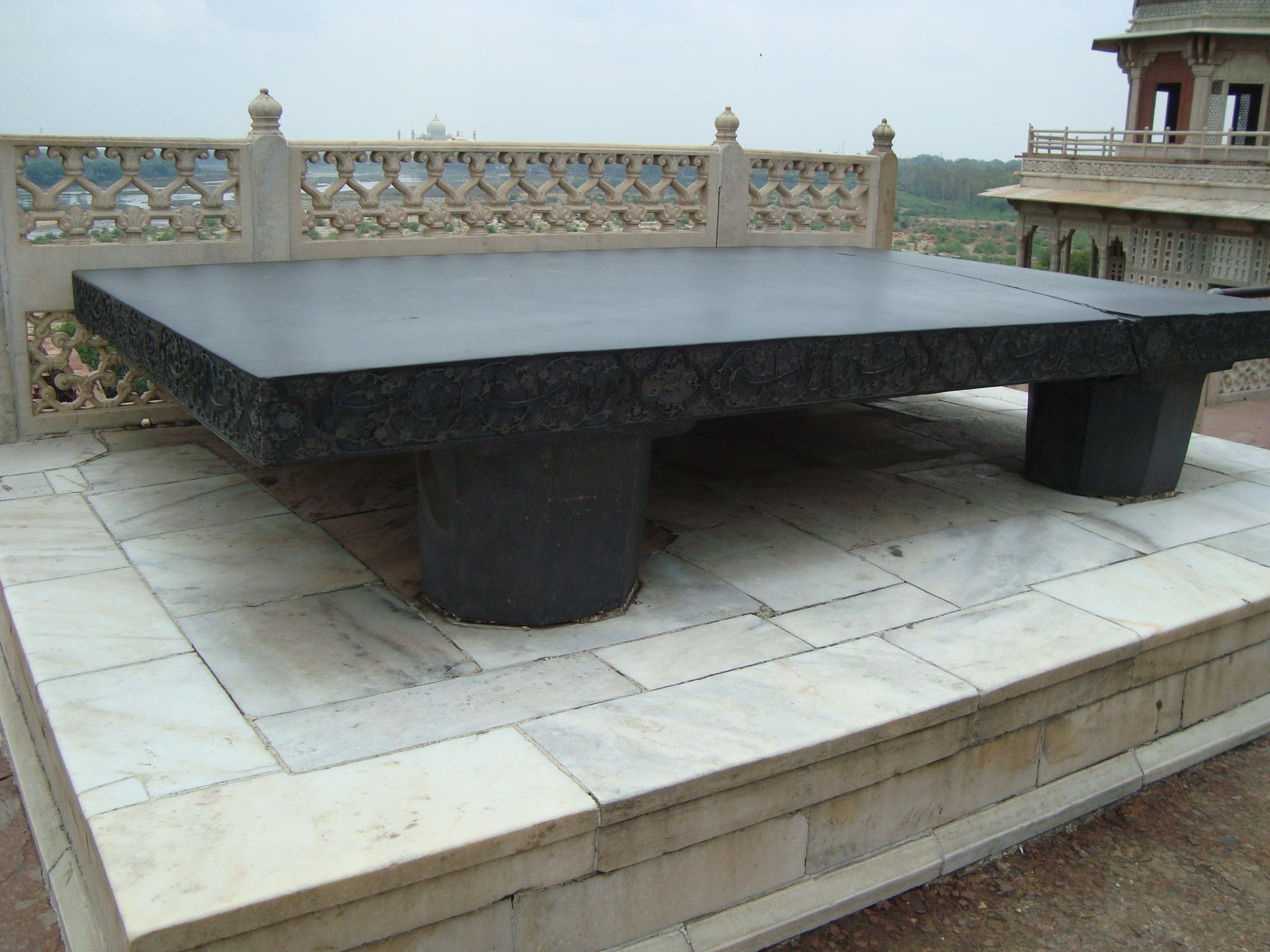
Throne of Jahangir

The Throne of Jahangir (Urdu: Takht-i-Jahangir) was built by Mughal emperor Jahangir (31 August 1569 – 28 October 1627) in 1602 and is located at the Diwan-i-Khas (hall of private audience) at the Red Fort in Agra.

== History ==
The throne was built in 1605 in Allahabad and kept at the Allahabad Fort. Even after Jahangir became king when his father, emperor Akbar died in 1605, the throne remained there. It was only in 1610, that it was brought from Allahabad to Agra by Jahangir.

There is a crack in this throne, said to be caused by the Jat ruler Maharaja Jawahar Singh, when Agra was under Jat rule.

== Structure ==
The throne is made of touchstone. It is 10 feet 7 inches long, 9 feet 10 inches broad and 6 inches thick. Its octagonal pedestals are each 1 foot 4 inches in height. At the top, it gently slopes from the centre to the sides like the shell of a tortoise. Persian inscriptions, dated 1602 are carved, in ornamental cartouches on its sides, in praise of Jahangir, whom they state as Shah and Sultan. This amounted to defiance of Akbar, who was at that time alive and on the throne. When the throne was finally brought to Agra, Jahangir had two inscriptions carved on top of the two western pedestals, stating that he had been only the heir to the throne, and that he had assumed the title of Nuruddin Muhammad Jahangir Badshah (Badshah Jahangir), only after his righteous accession.
