= Daria-i-Noor =

Large cut diamond

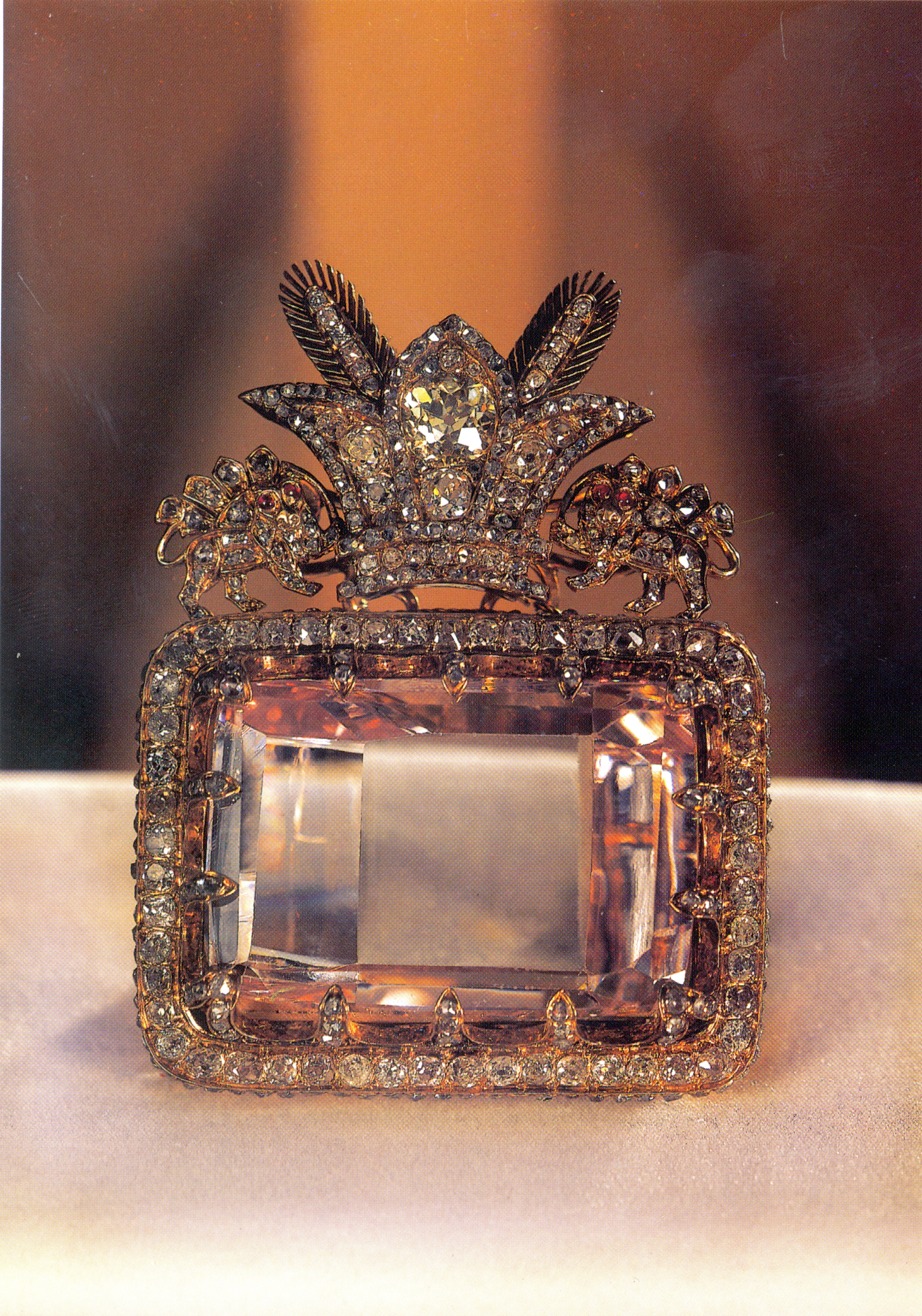
- The Daria-i-Noor diamond from the collection of the Iranian National Jewels
- Weight: 182 carats (36.4 g)
- Color: Pale pink
- Cut: Tabular, free-form; Inscribed
- Country of origin: India
- Mine of origin: Kollur Mine, present-day Andhra Pradesh, India
- Owner: Central Bank of Iran, Tehran, Iran

The Daria-i-Noor is one of the largest cut diamonds in the world, weighing an estimated 182 carats (36 g). Its colour, pale pink, is one of the rarest to be found in diamonds. The diamond is currently in the Iranian National Jewels collection of the Central Bank of Iran in Tehran. During the reign of Naser al-Din Shah Qajar, an elaborate frame was crafted from 457 smaller diamonds and four rubies, crowned by Iran's imperial insignia.

== Dimensions ==
It is 41.40 mm × 29.50 mm × 12.15 mm (1.630 in × 1.161 in × 0.478 in) and weighs around 182 metric carats. It is the world's largest known pink diamond. Originally, it may have been cut from an even larger stone.

== History ==
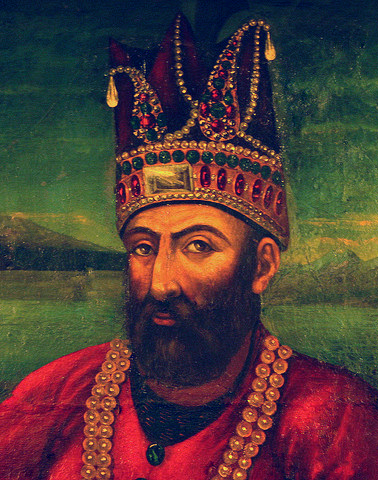
Posthumous painting of Nader Shah wearing the Daria-i-Noor by Abu'l-Hasan Mostawfi Ghaffari, 1774

This diamond, as is also presumed for the Koh-i-Noor, was mined in Kollur Mine in the Golconda region of Andhra Pradesh, India. Its early origins are shrouded in mystery, but it is believed to have been one of the eyes of the Mughal Peacock Throne. Its name means "sea of light".

In 1739, Nader Shah of Iran invaded Northern India and occupied Delhi. As payment for returning the crown of India to the Mughal emperor Muhammad Shah, he took possession of the entire fabled treasury of the Mughals, including the Daria-i-Noor, the Koh-i-Noor, and the Peacock Throne.

After Nader Shah's death in 1747, the diamond was inherited by his grandson, Shahrokh Shah. From there, it fell into the hands of Lotf Ali Khan. After Lotf Ali Khan's defeat at the hands of Agha Mohammad Khan Qajar, who established the ruling Qajar dynasty of Iran, the Daria-i-Noor entered the Qajar treasury. During this time, Naser al-Din Shah Qajar was said to be very fond of the diamond, often wearing it as an arm band, an aigrette, or a brooch, and maintenance of the diamond was an honour bestowed upon higher ranking individuals.

== Possible association ==
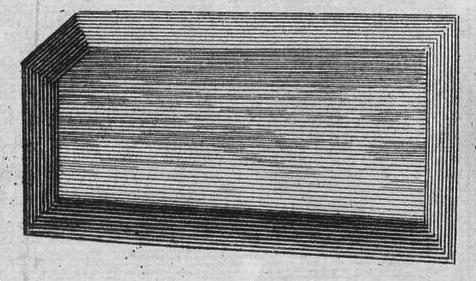
Drawing of the Great Table diamond, by Tavernier, in 1676

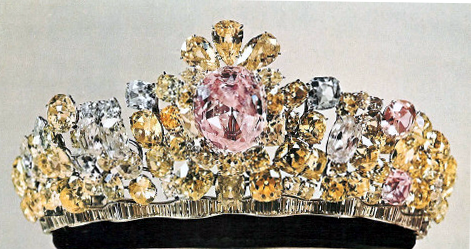
Noor-ul-Ain tiara

In 1965, a Canadian team conducting research on the Iranian Crown Jewels concluded that the Daria-i-Noor may well have been part of a large pink diamond that had been studded in the throne of the Mughal emperor Shah Jahan, and had been described in the journal of the French jeweller Jean-Baptiste Tavernier in 1642, who called it the Great Table diamond ("Diamanta Grande Table"). This diamond may have been cut into two pieces; the larger part is the Daria-i-Noor; the smaller part is believed to be the 60-carat (12 g) Noor-ul-Ain diamond, presently studded in a tiara also in the Iranian Imperial collection.

== Namesake ==
A different, much smaller, diamond has occasionally been called "Daria-i-Noor" in Bangladeshi reporting, and is reportedly kept in a bank vault in Dhaka.

== Gallery ==
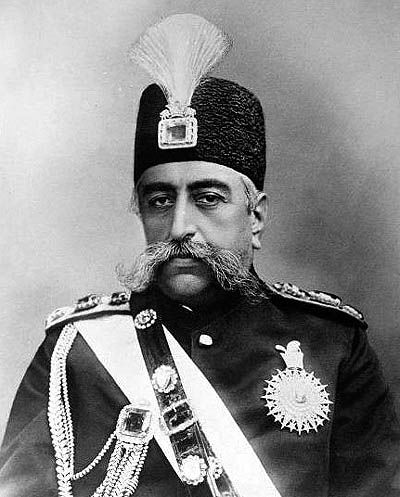
Mozaffar ad-Din Shah Qajar wearing the Daria-i-Noor on his hat, turn of the century

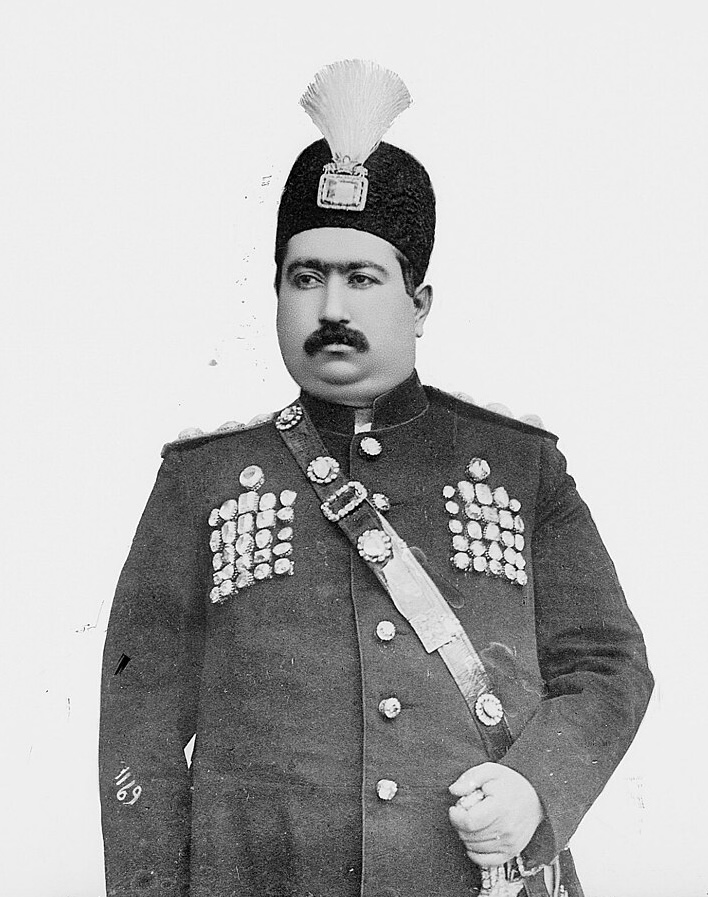
Mohammad Ali Shah Qajar wearing the Daria-i-Noor on his hat, 1907–1909

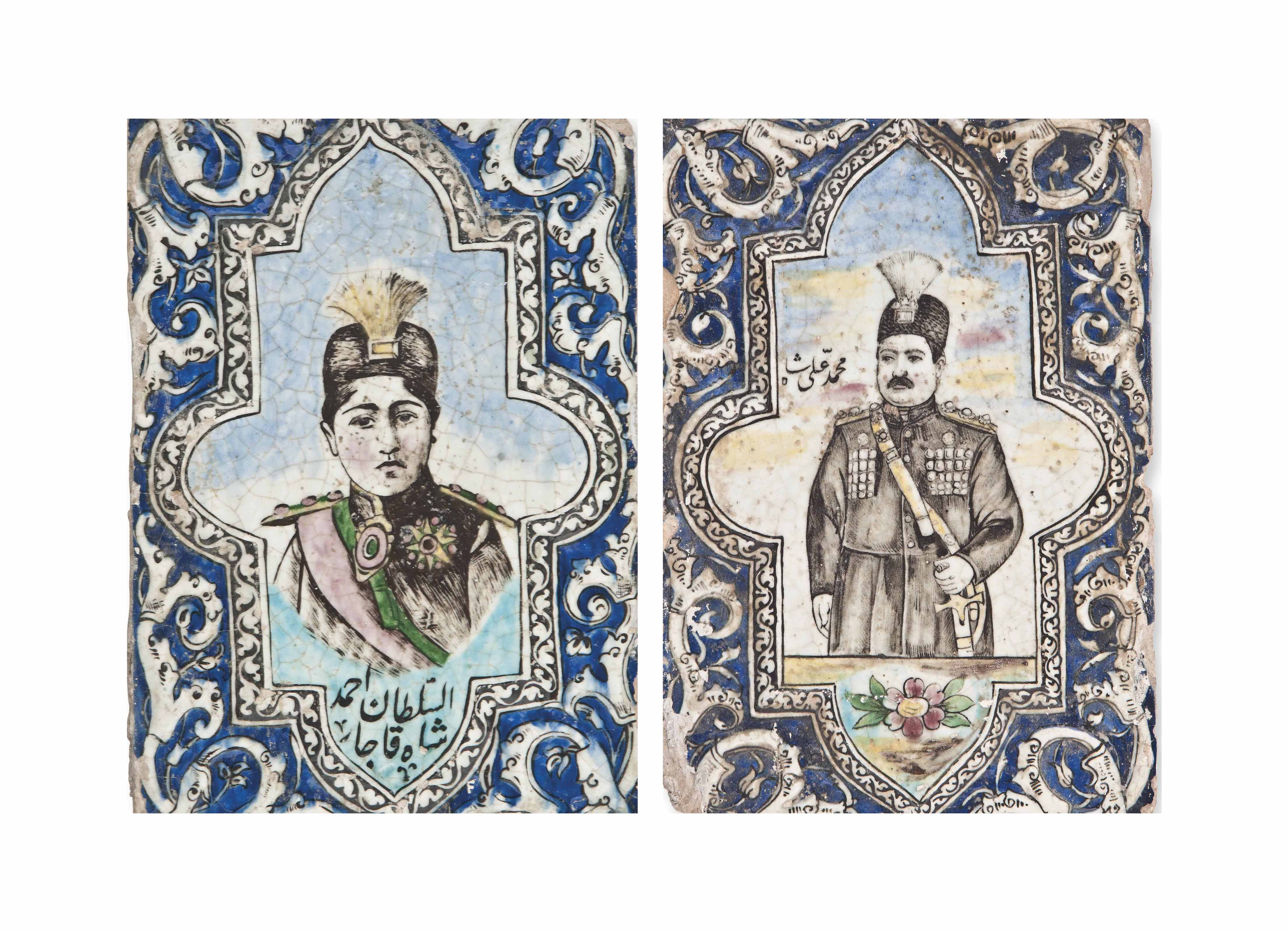
Tiles depicting Ahmad Shah Qajar (left) and Mohammad Ali Shah wearing the Daria-i-Norr on their hats, early 20th century

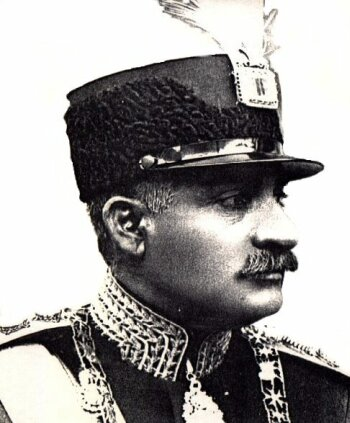
Reza Shah wearing the Daria-i-Noor on his hat

== See also ==
- Golconda diamonds
- Great Table diamond
- Koh-i-Noor
- List of diamonds
- List of largest rough diamonds
- Noor-ul-Ain
