= Diwan-i-Khas (Lahore Fort) =

Diwan-e-Khas
- دیوانِ خاص
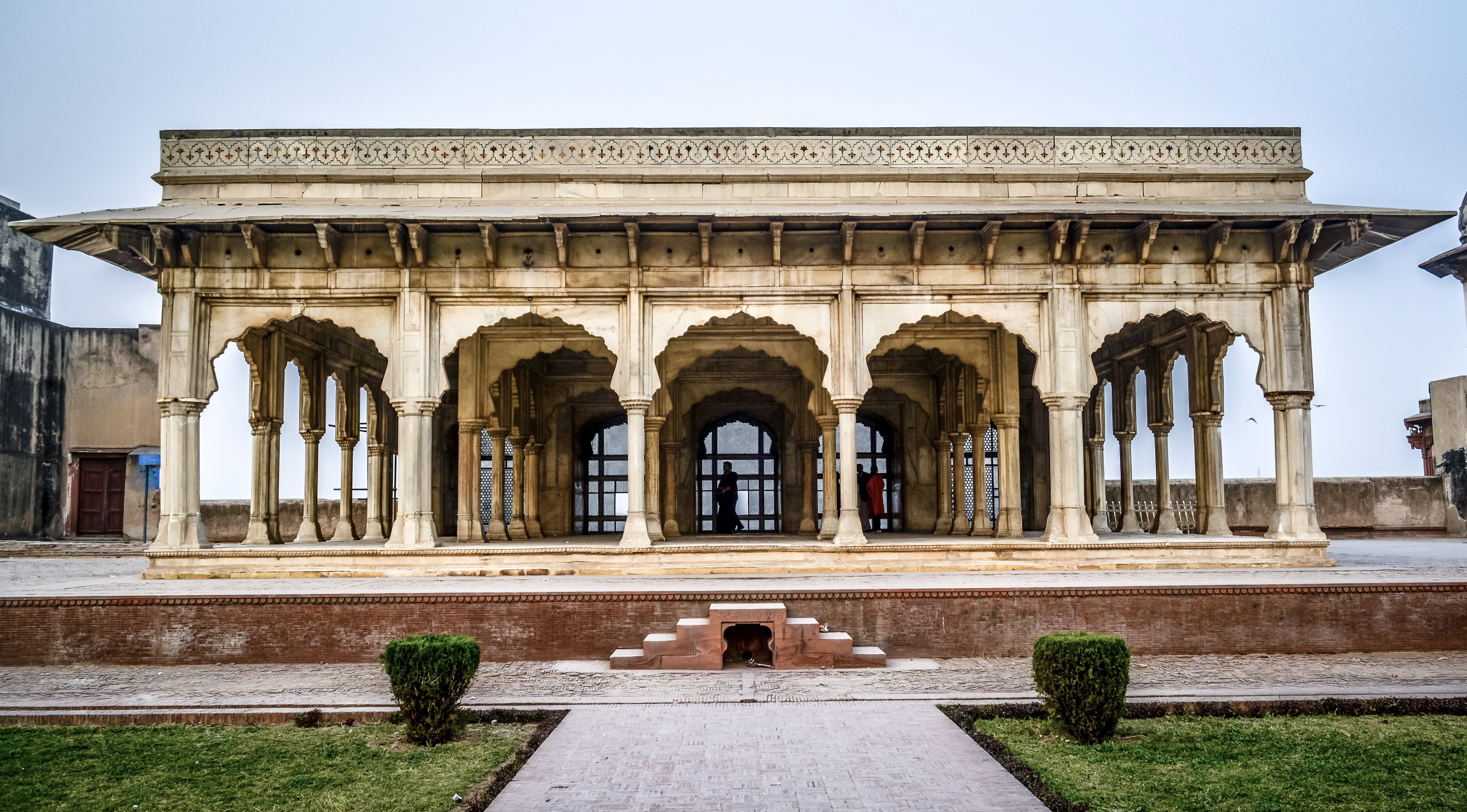

General information
- Type: Public monument
- Architectural style: Mughal
- Location: Lahore, Punjab, Pakistan

The Diwan-i-Khas (Urdu: دیوانِ خاص, or "Hall of Private Audiences") is located in the Lahore Fort in Lahore, Pakistan. It served as the place where the Mughal emperors received courtiers and state guests.

In contrast to the Diwan-i-Aam ("Hall of Public Audience"), the Diwan-i-Khas served as a hall where the Mughal Emperor would attend to matters of the state. The hall was the site of elaborate pageantry, with processions of up to one hour long occurring before each audience session.

== Gallery ==
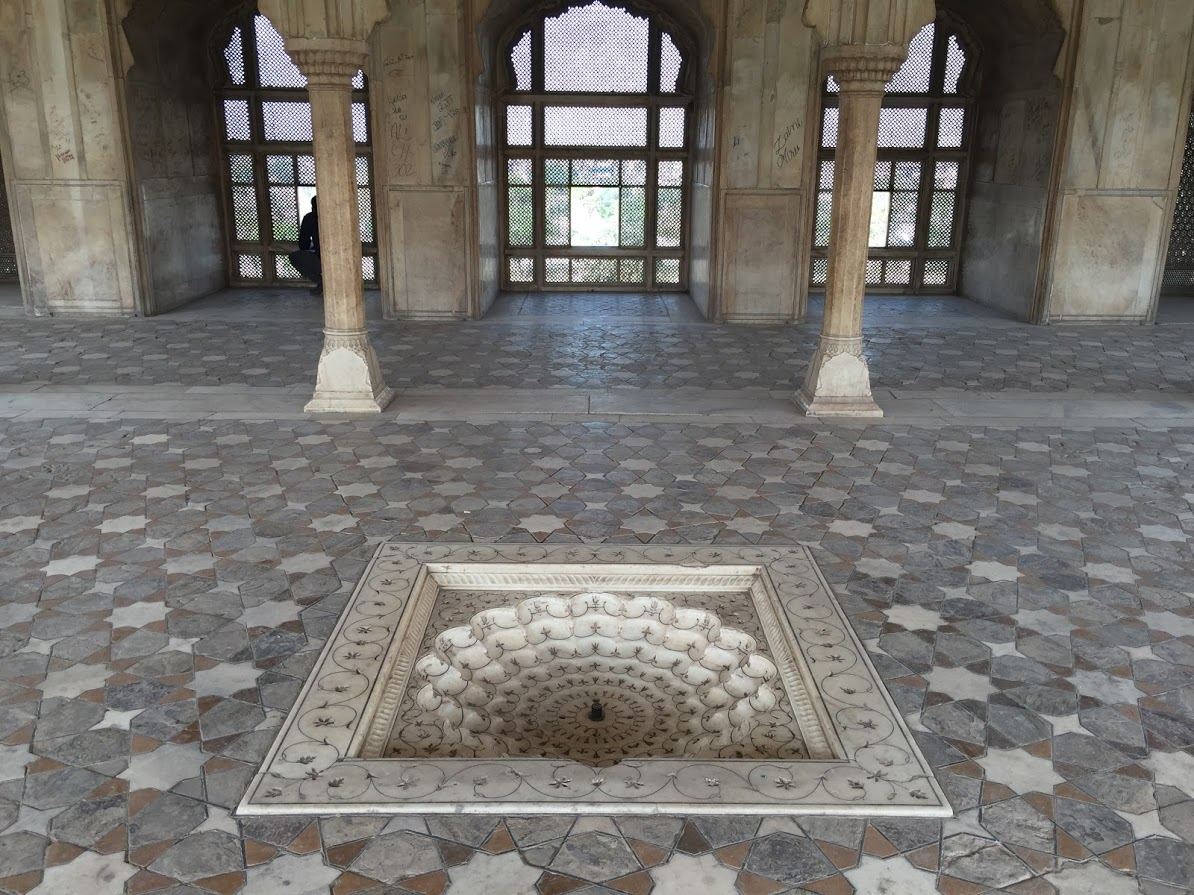
Interior, March 2016

== See also ==
- Diwan-i-Khas (Red Fort), Delhi
