= Shahjahannama =

17th century book by Mughal historian Inayet Khan

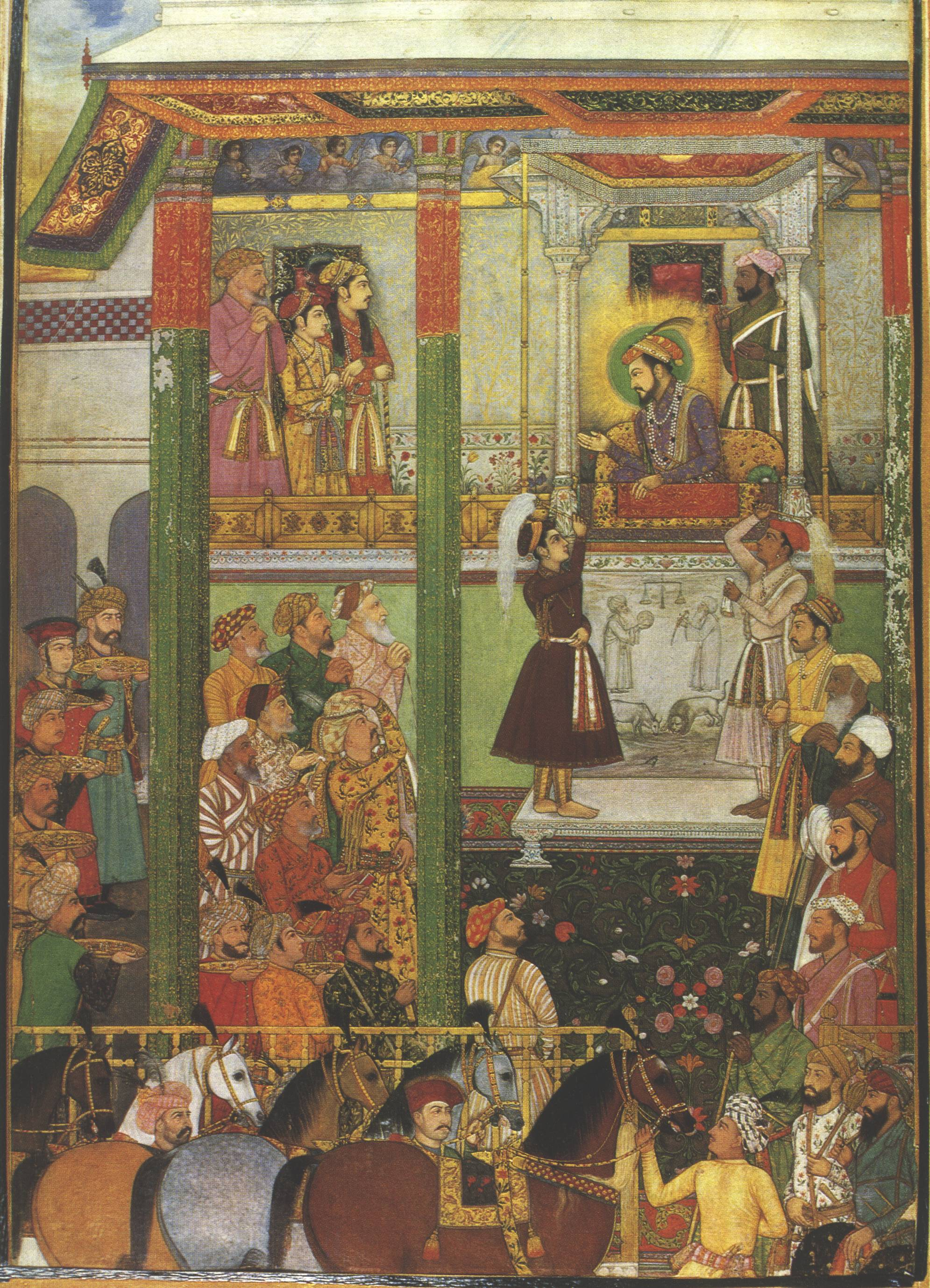
- The Mughal Emperor Shah Jahan receives Safavid ambassadors in the year 1636, from a Padshahnama.
- Author: Inayat Khan
- Language: Persian
- Genre: Biography
- Set in: 17th century Mughal India
- Publication place: Mughal Empire (India)
- Text: Shahjahannama at Wikisource

The Shahjahannama (Persian: شاه جهان نما; lit. 'Chronicle of Shah Jahan') is a genre of works written about the Mughal Emperor Shah Jahan. Padshahnama is a term for lavishly illuminated versions.

A significant work in this genre was written by the historian Inayat Khan in the 17th century. The first complete English translation from Persian appeared in the 19th century by A. R. Fuller.
