= Diwan-i-Am (Red Fort) =

Building in Delhi, India

Coordinates: 28.655713°N 77.242283°E

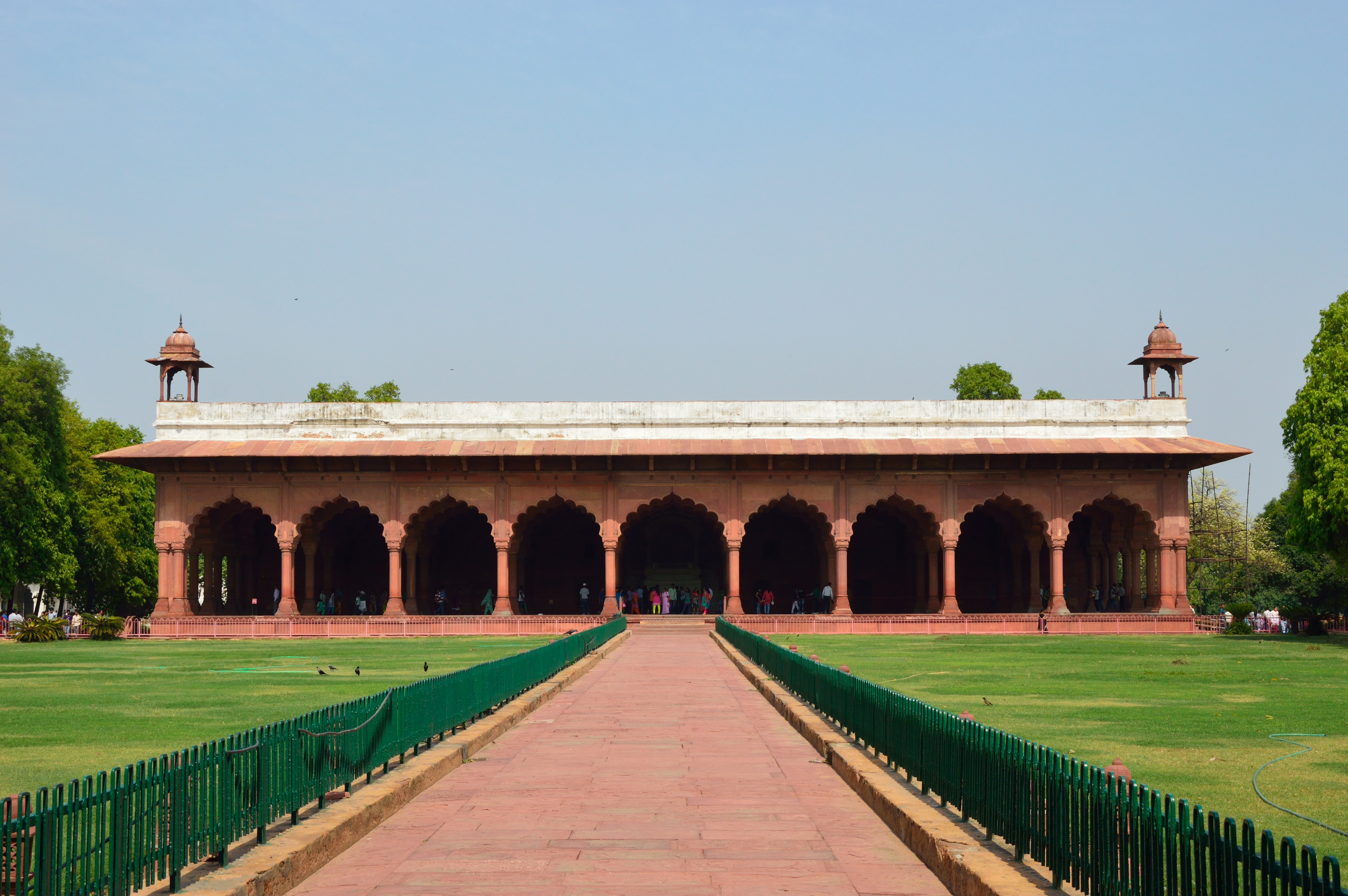

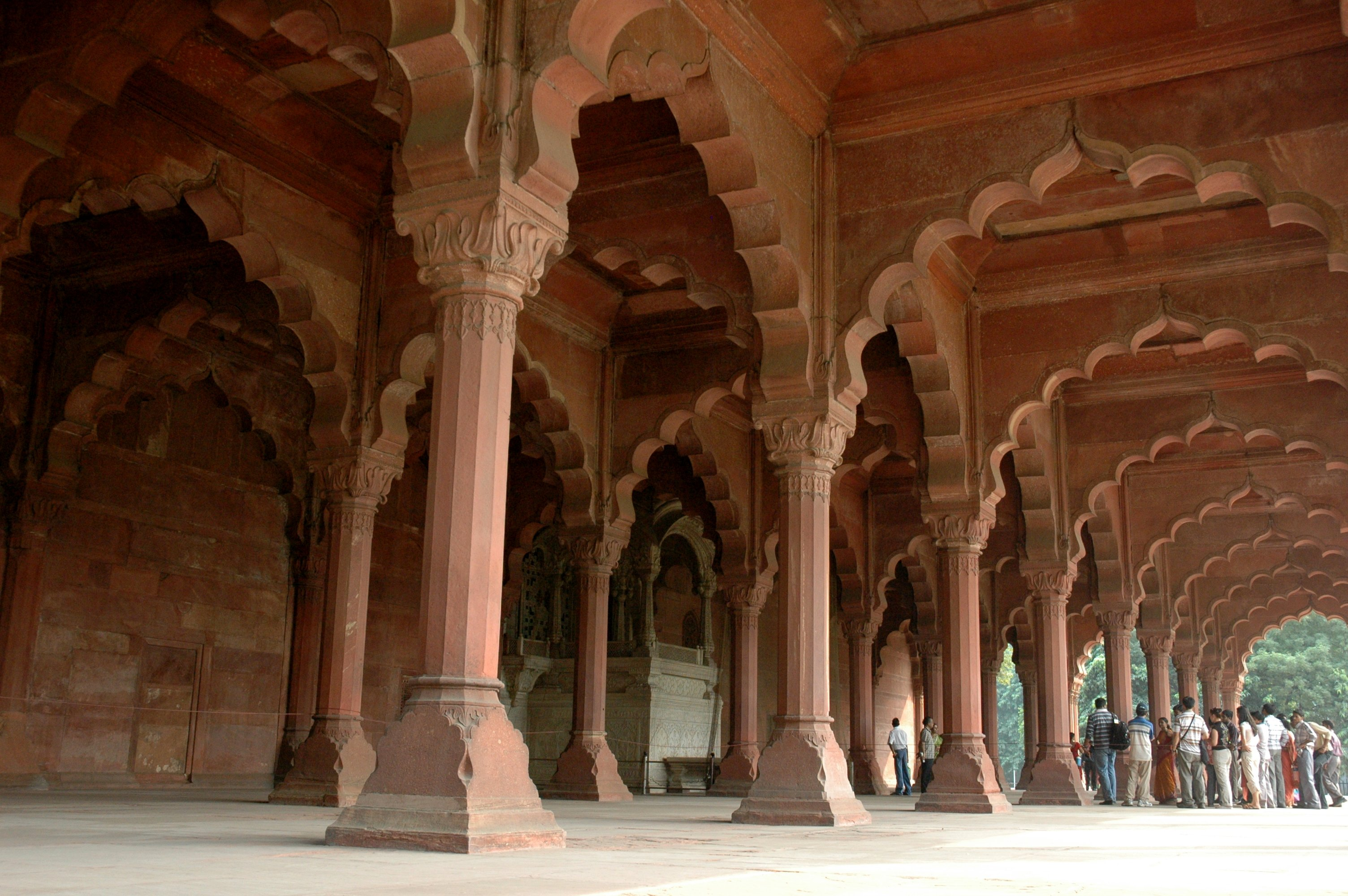
Interior view facing the jharokha

The Diwan-i-Am, or Hall of Audience, is a building in the Red Fort of Old Delhi where the Mughal emperor Shah Jahan (1592–1666) and his successors received members of the general public and heard their grievances.

The inner main court to which the Nakkarkhana led was 540 feet broad, 420 feet deep, and surrounded by arcade galleries, where chieftains (umaras) on duty were posted. On the further side of it is the Diwan-i-Am.

The Diwan-i-Am consists of a front hall, open on three sides and backed by a set of rooms faced in red sandstone. The hall is 100 ft × 60 ft and divided into 27 square bays on a system of columns which support the arches. The roof is spanned by sandstone beams.

The proportions of this hall, of its columns, and of the engraved arches have been described as showing high aesthetics and fine craftsmanship. With a façade of nine engraved arch openings, the hall was ornamented with gilded and white shell lime chunam plaster work. Its ceiling and columns were painted with gold.

In the centre of the eastern wall stands a marble canopy (jharokha) covered by a "Bengal" roof. A marble dais below the throne, inlaid with semi-precious stones, was used by the prime minister (wazir) to receive petitions. The emperor was separated from the courtiers by a gold-plated railing, while a silver railing ran around the remaining three sides of the hall. The audience ceremony is known as Jharokha Darshan.

Behind the canopy, the wall is decorated with panels inlaid with multi-coloured pietra dura stones. They represent flowers and birds and are reputedly carved by Austin de Bordeaux, a Florentine jeweler. The hall was restored by Lord Curzon, while the inlay work of the throne recess and the plaques of the arch to the west side of the throne were restored by the Florentine artist Mennegatti. Bernier gives a full account of the splendid appearance of the hall during the rule of Aurangzeb, as well as the 17th-century merchant Jean-Baptiste Tavernier.

== Gallery ==
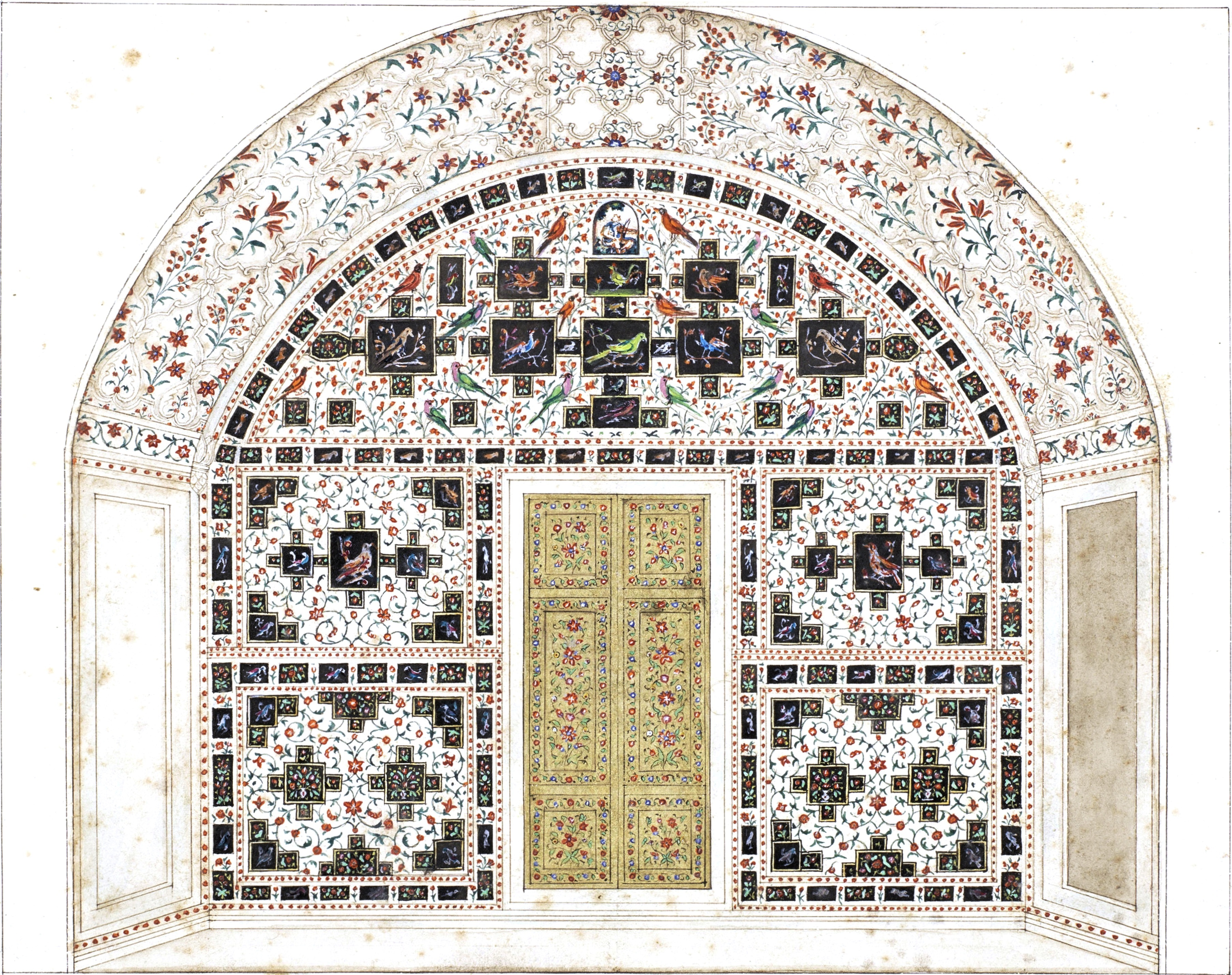
The wall of the balcony with inlay work (painting by Ghulam Ali Khan, before 1854)

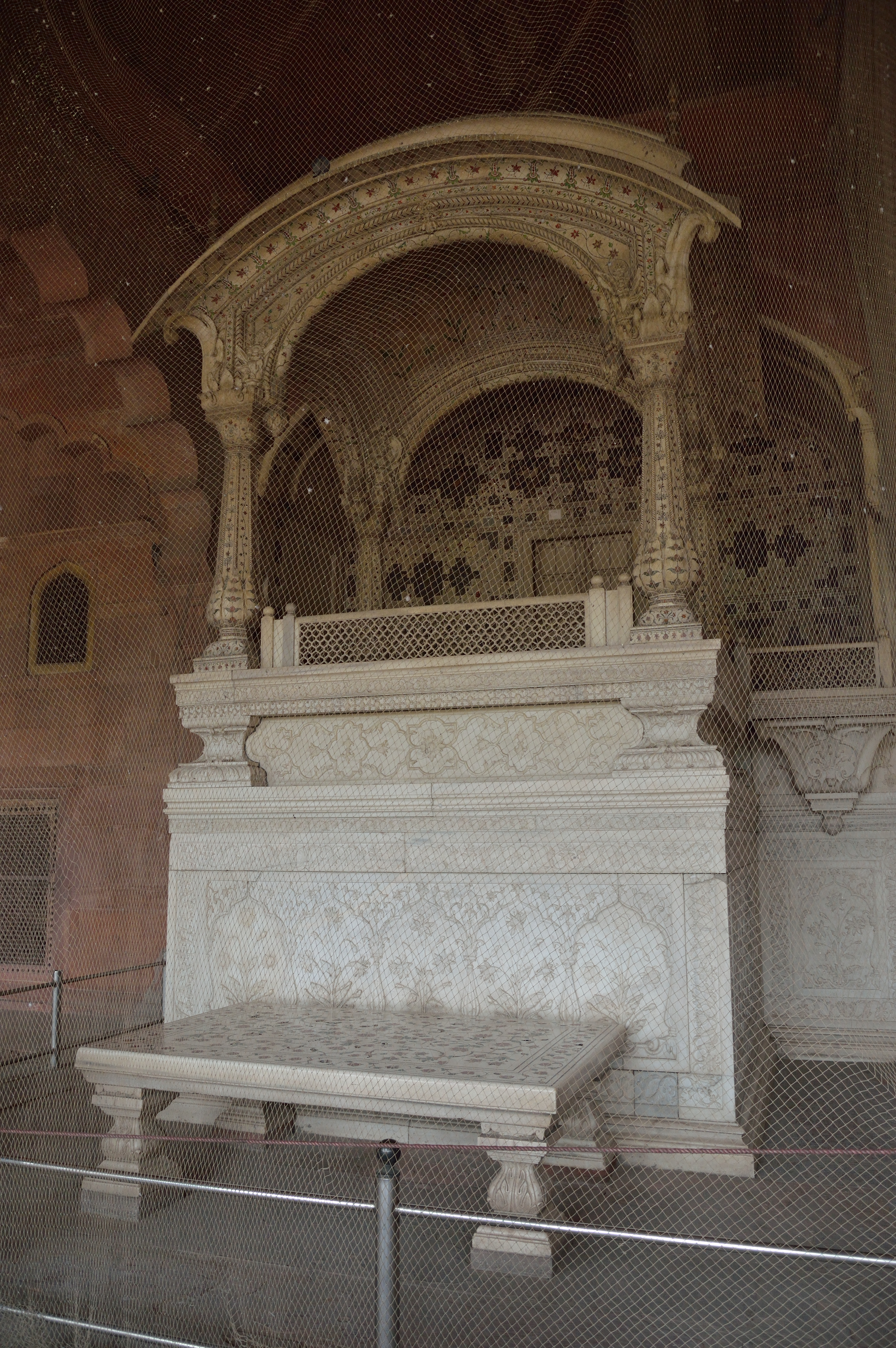
The throne of Shah Jahan (today with anti-bird netting)

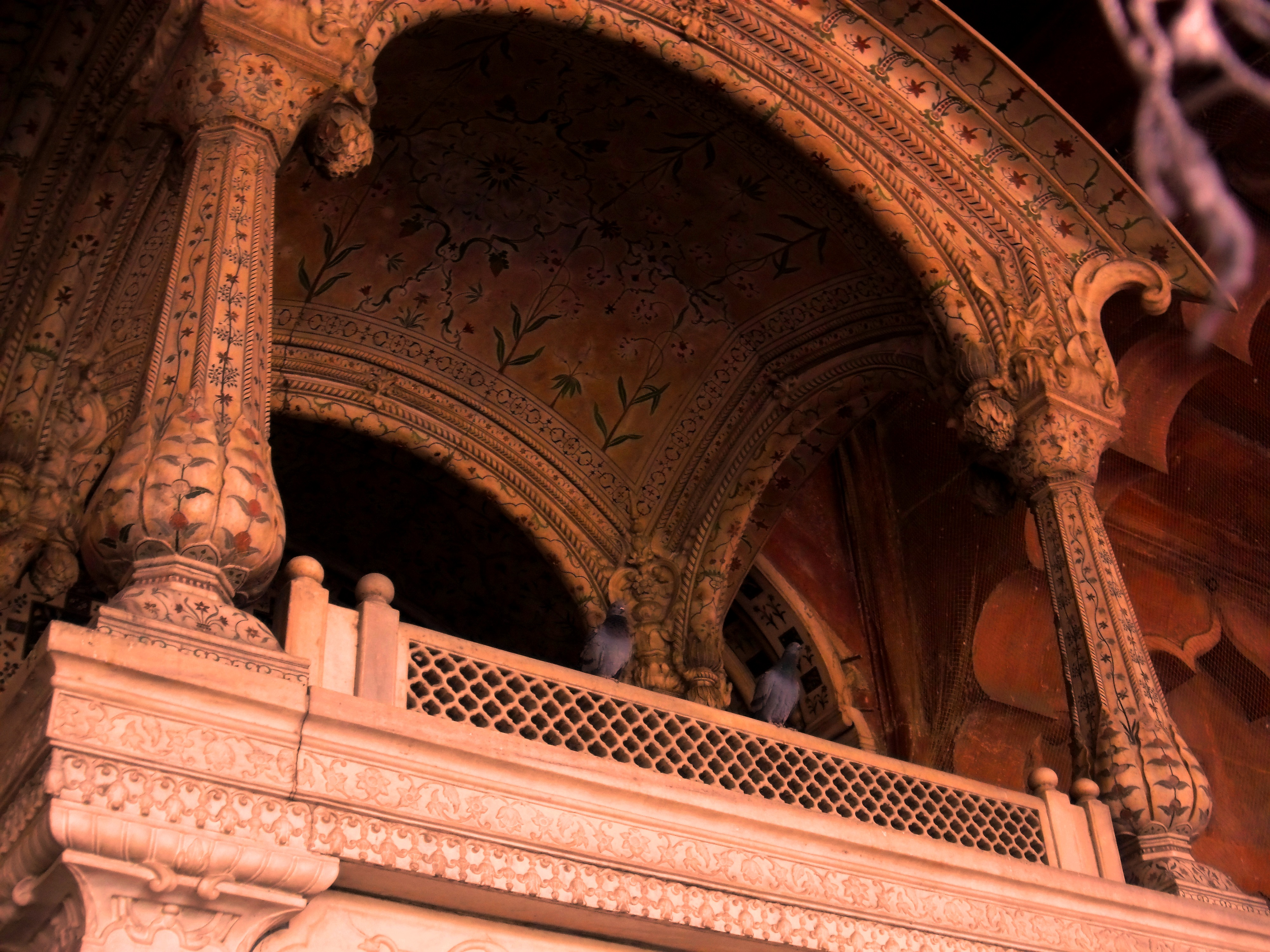
Throne detail

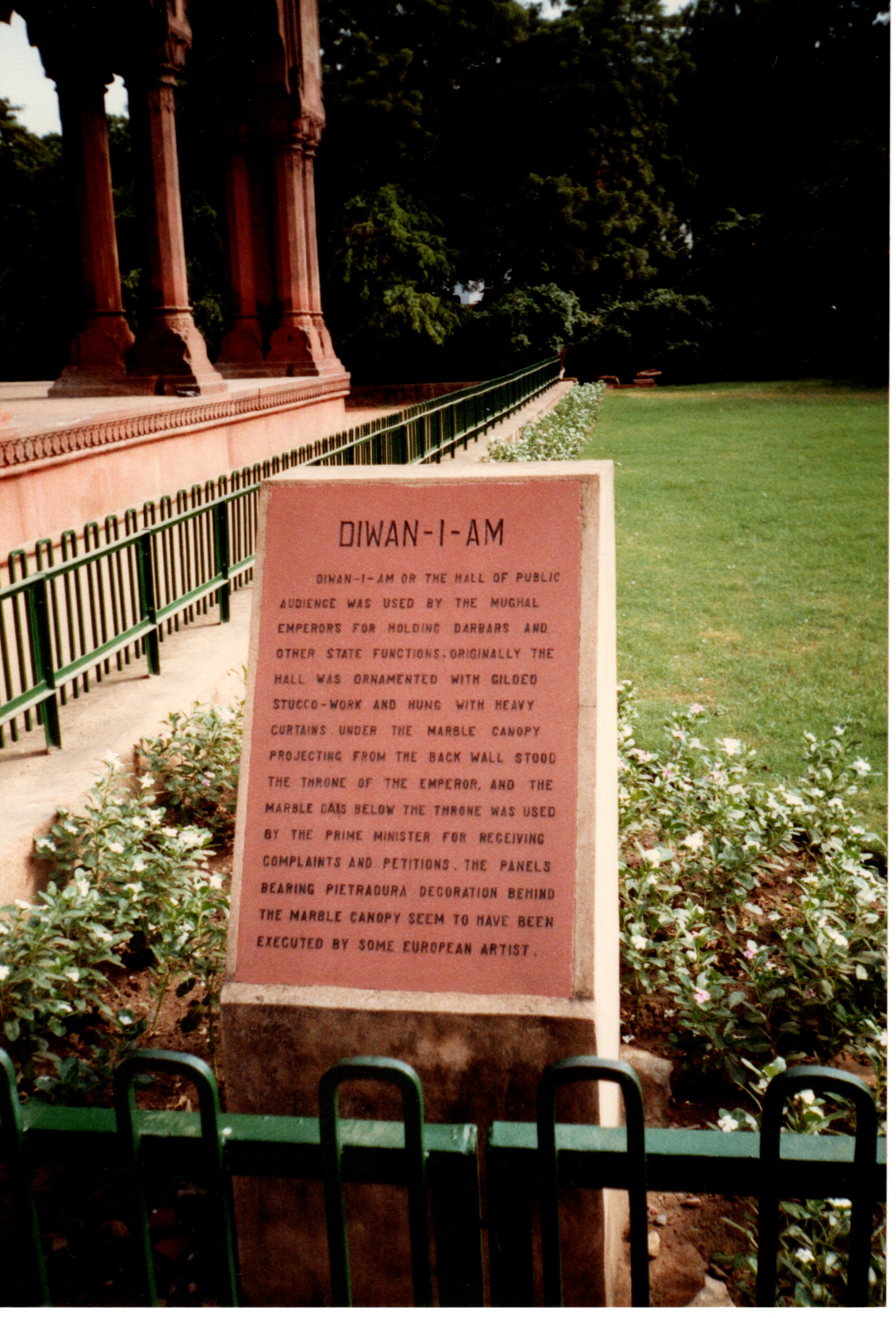
Diwan-i-Am Description

The decoration included European themes, such as this pietre dure panel of Orpheus charming the animals, reproduced in a 1840s watercolour.

== See also ==
- Diwan-i-Khas
- Peacock Throne
