= Diwan-i-Khas (Red Fort) =

Reception chamber in Delhi, India

Coordinates: 28.656426°N 77.243595°E

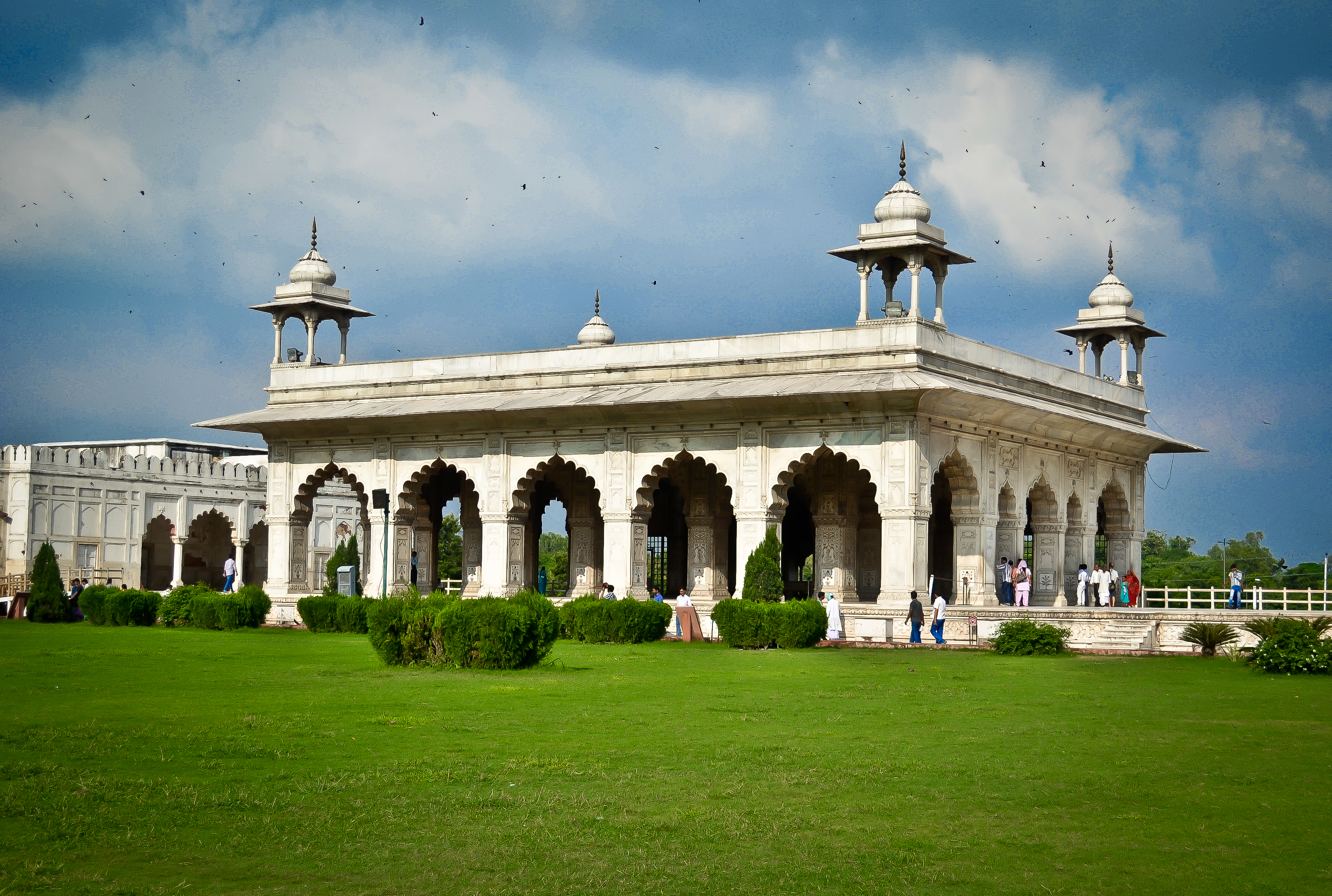
The Diwan-i-Khas in the Red Fort

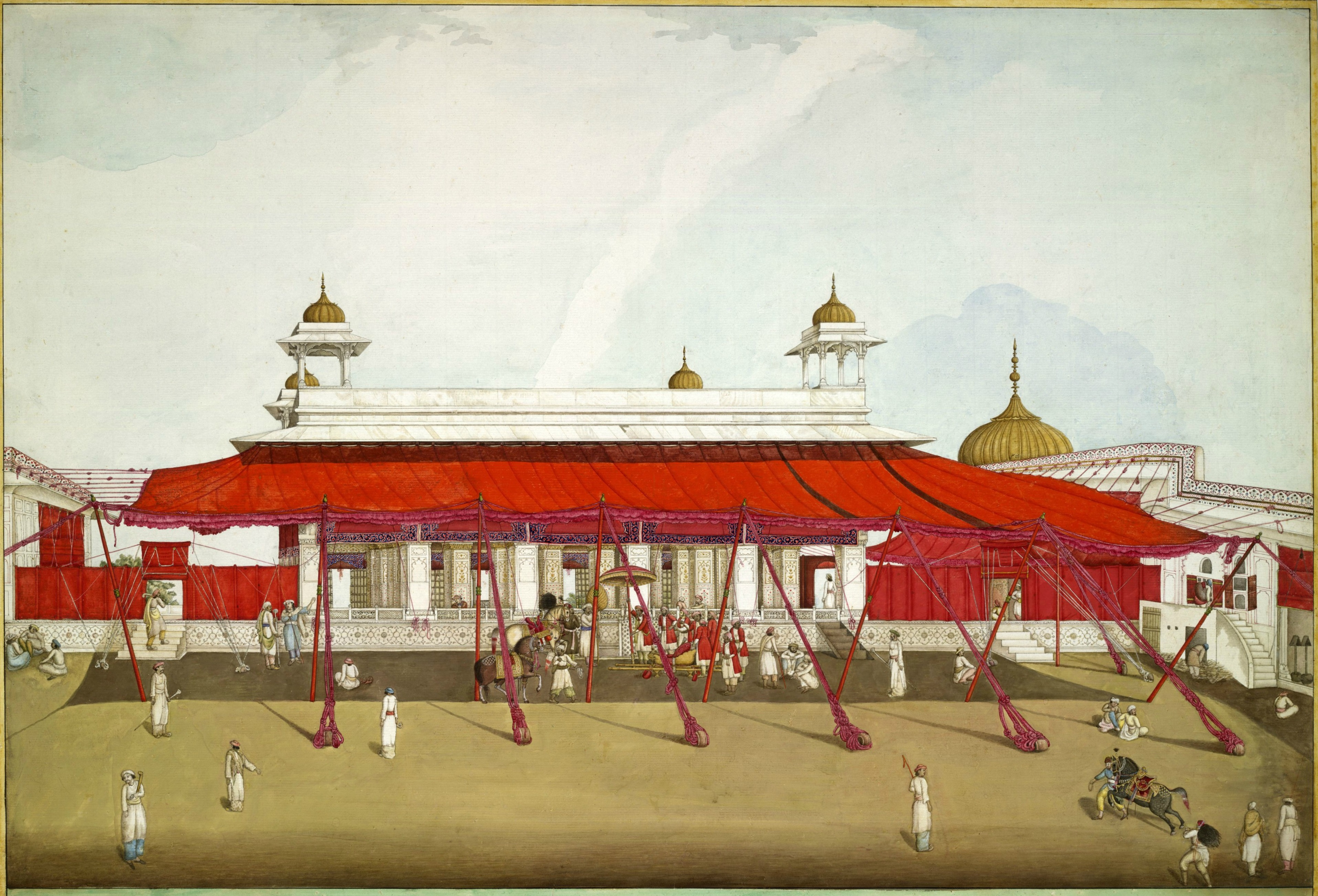
The Diwan-i-Khas with red shamiana, around 1817 (by Ghulam Ali Khan)

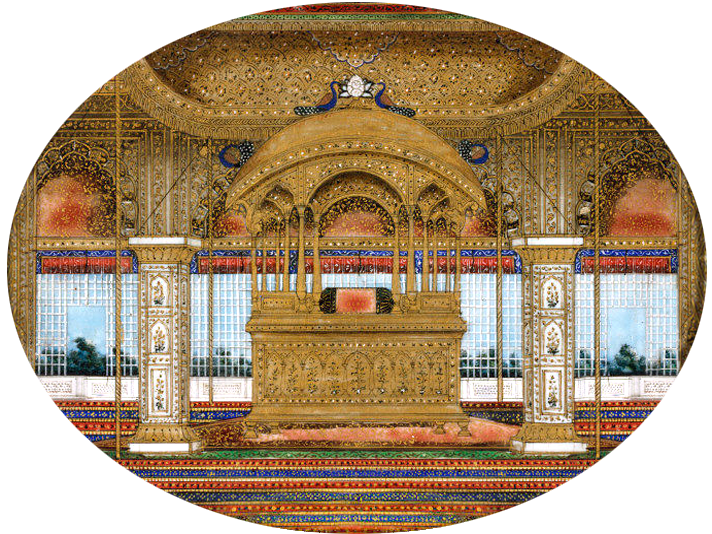
The Peacock Throne in the mid-19th century

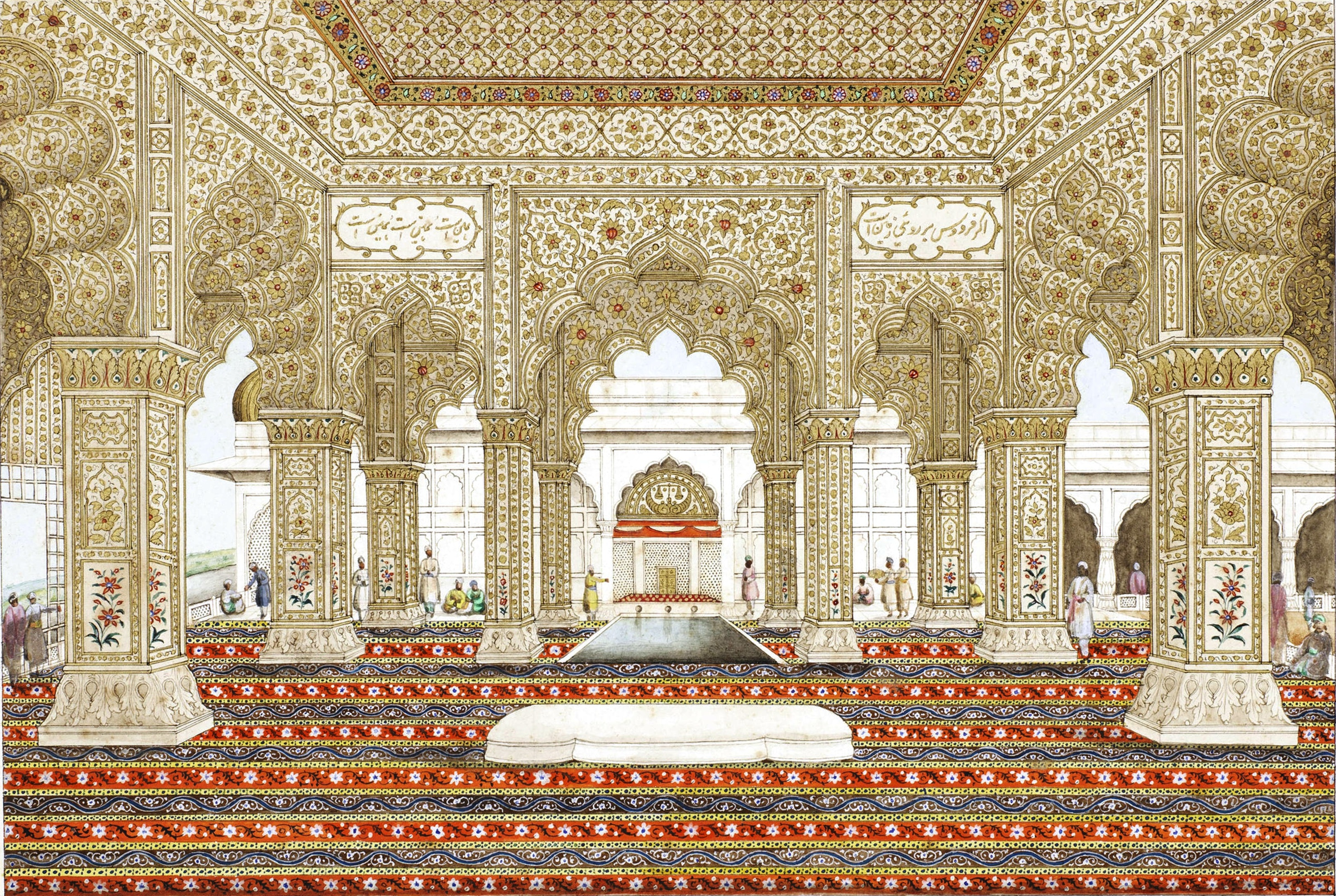
Interior view with the Stream of Paradise towards the Khas Mahal (before 1854, by Ghulam Ali Khan)

The Diwan-i-Khas (Persian: ديوان خاص), or Hall of Private Audiences, was a chamber in the Red Fort of Old Delhi built in 1648 as a location for receptions. It was the location where the Mughal Emperor Shah Jahan received courtiers and state guests. It was also known as the Shah Mahal.

A gate on the north side of the preceding Diwan-i-Am audience hall led to the innermost court of the palace called Jalau Khana and the Diwan-i-Khas. Originally there were two enclosures on the west of the hall, one for the nobles and the other for those of a lower rank. These arcaded courts were destroyed after the Indian Rebellion of 1857. The interior was completely plundered following the Indian Rebellion of 1857. The throne, the carpets, and any other items went missing. The hall today is, therefore, only a shell of what it used to be. Recent restoration work has been redone on the panels of inlay and has also reproduced the gilded pattern on one of the pillars fronting the hall.

It measures 90 × 67 feet. It consists of a rectangular central chamber, surrounded by a series of arches rising from marble piers. The lower parts of the piers are inlaid with floral designs, while the upper portions are painted and gilded. The four corners of the roof are surmounted by pillared chhatri.

The ceiling, which was originally inlaid with silver and gold, was stripped bare by successive financial crises of the empire, at the hands of the Jats or Marathas. The current ceiling was installed in 1911. The later Peacock Throne from after Nader Shah's invasion once stood in this hall, towards the east side.

Through the centre of the hall flowed the Stream of Paradise (Nahr-i-Bihisht). The building used to have red awnings, or shamianas. Over the corner-arches of the northern and southern walls below the cornice is inscribed the verse of Amir Khusrow: "If there be a paradise on earth, it is this, it is this, it is this." The French traveller François Bernier described seeing the Peacock Throne there. Jean-Baptiste Tavernier described seeing the throne in the Diwan-i-Am, to where it was probably moved, and described five smaller thrones with four on each corner and one in the middle of the hall.

In the riverbed below the hall and the connected buildings was the space known as zer-jharokha, or "beneath the lattices".

== Gallery ==
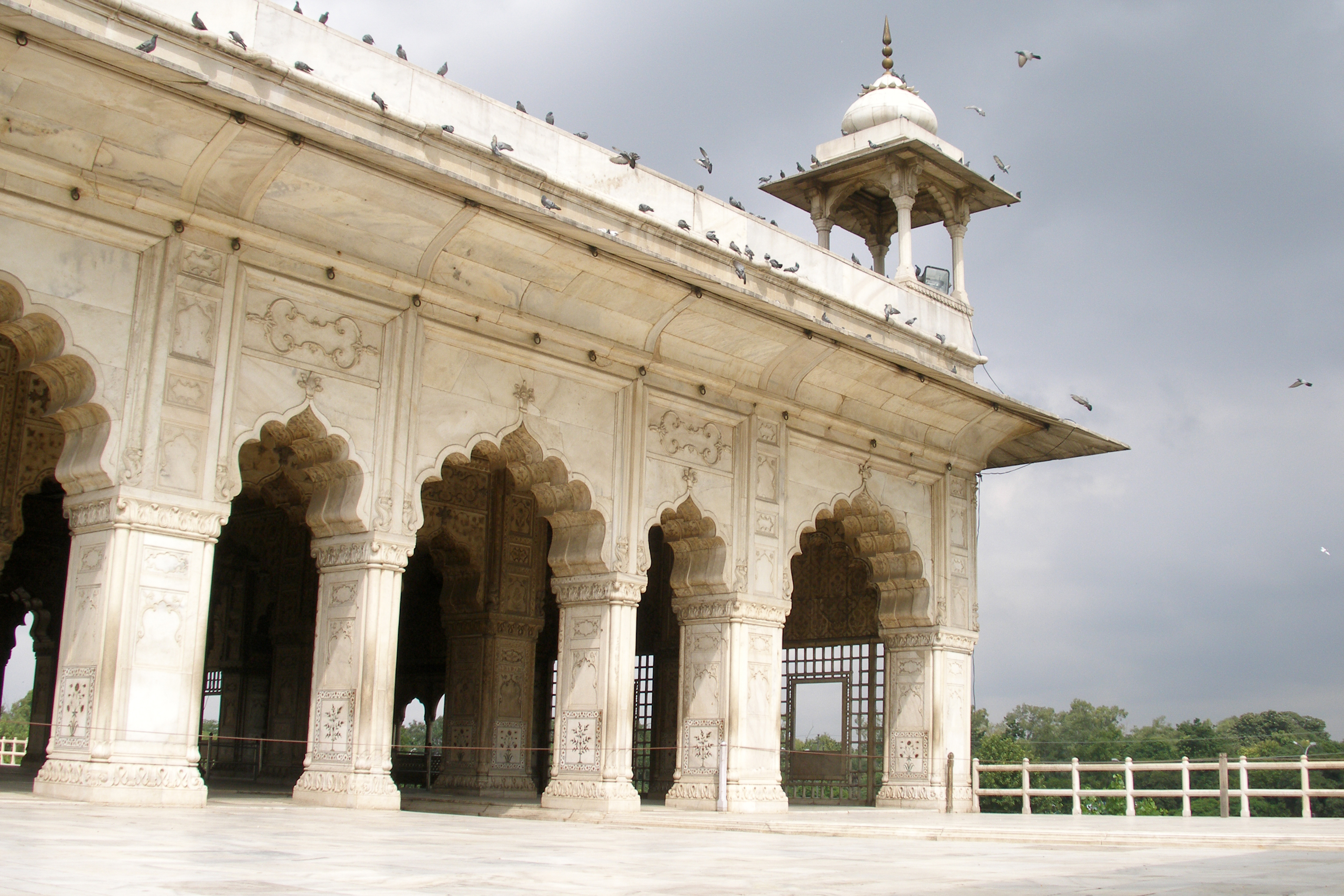
Side view

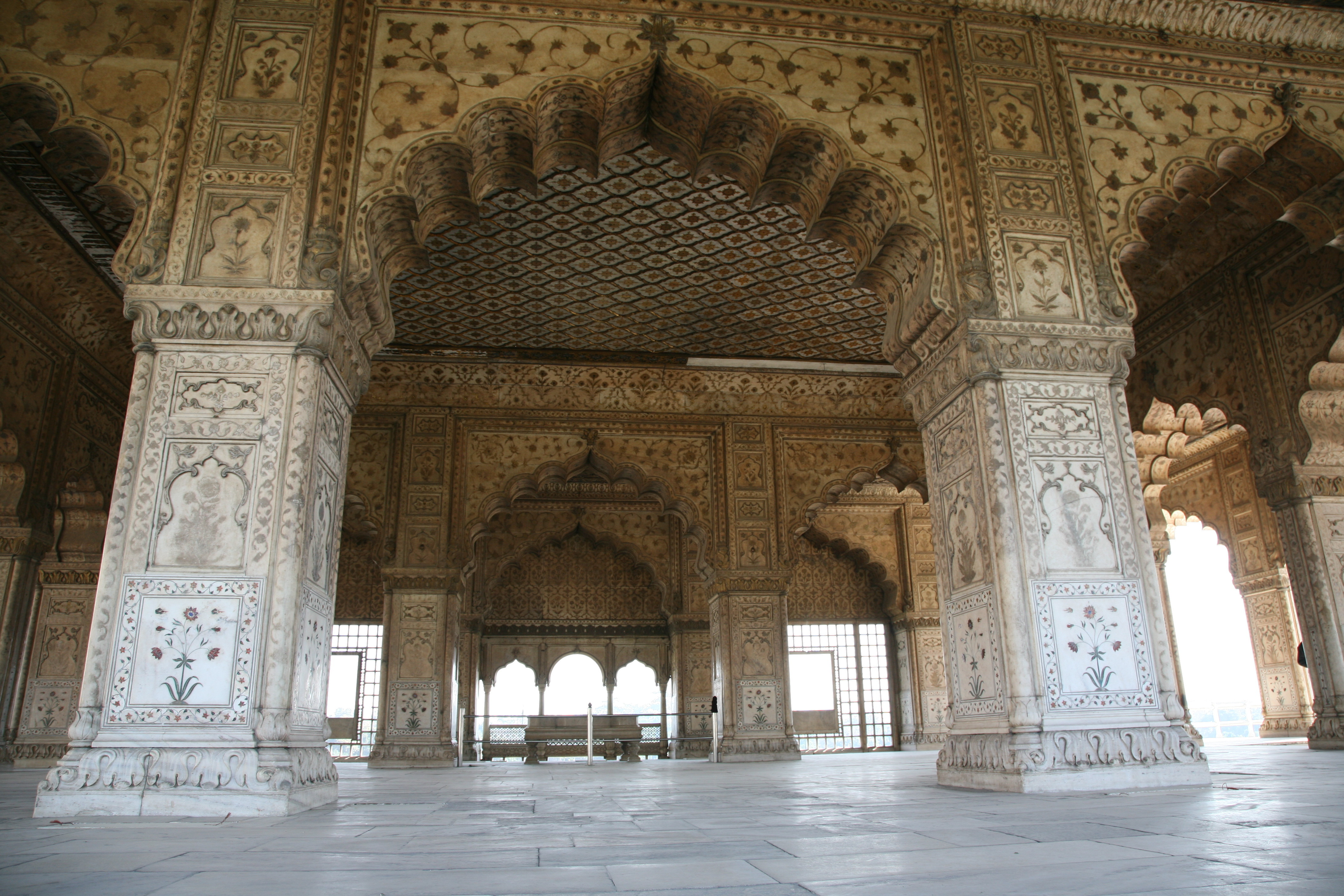
Interior today

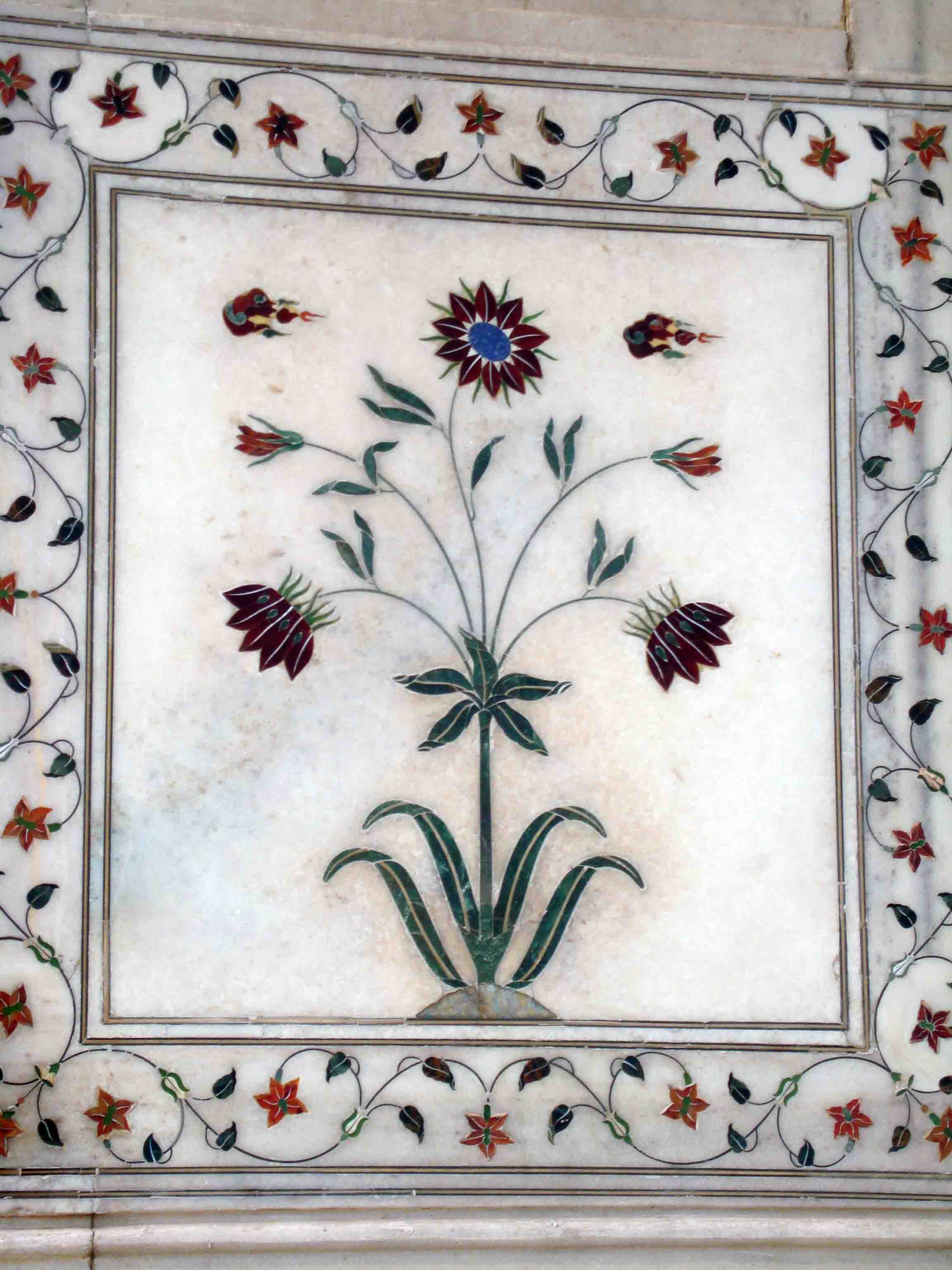
One of the inlaid marble panels

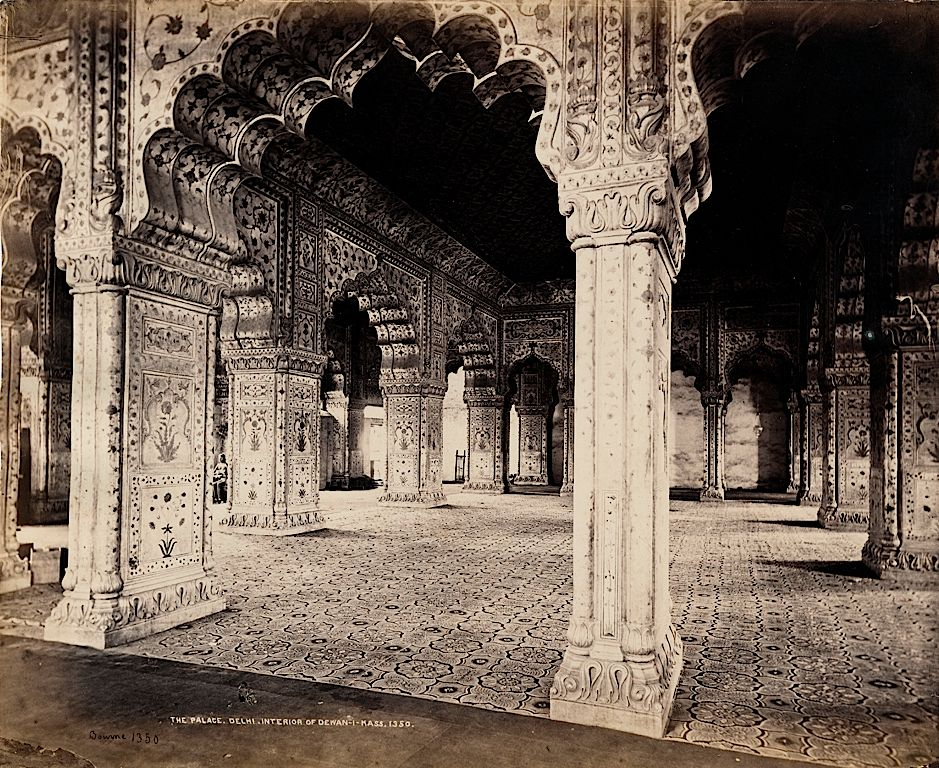
Samuel Bourne, "The Palace. Delhi. Interior of Dewan-i-Kass. 1350," 1863-1869, photograph mounted on cardboard sheet, Department of Image Collections, National Gallery of Art Library, Washington, DC

== See also ==
- Diwan-i-Am
- Diwan-i-Khas, Lahore
