= Great Table diamond =

Large pink diamond that had been studded in the throne of the Mughal emperor Shah Jahan

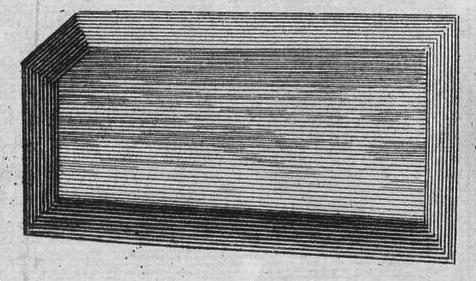
Drawing of the Great Table diamond, by Tavernier in 1676

The Great Table was a large pink diamond that had been studded in the throne of the Mughal emperor Shah Jahan. It has been described in the book of the French jeweller Jean-Baptiste Tavernier in 1642, who gave it its name ("Diamanta Grande Table").

The diamond was plundered from the Mughal treasury of Mohammad Shah by Nader Shah during his invasion of India in 1739 and disappeared after his assassination in Khorasan in 1747.

In 1965, a Canadian team from the Royal Ontario Museum conducting research on the Iranian Crown Jewels concluded that the larger Daria-i-Noor and the smaller Noor-ul-Ain 60 carats (12 g) may well have been part of the Great Table.

== See also ==
- Daria-i-Noor
- Golconda Diamonds
- Koh-i-Noor diamond
- Noor-ul-Ain
- List of diamonds
- List of largest rough diamonds
