= Inayat Khan (historian) =

Mughal historian (1628–1671)

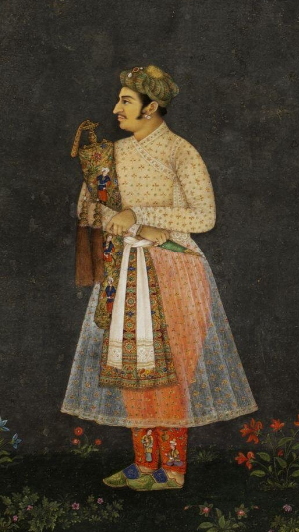
- Portrait of Inayat Khan c.1615 at the Victoria and Albert Museum
- Born: Muhammad Tahir; 1628; Agra, Agra Subah, Mughal Empire, (modern-day Uttar Pradesh, India
- Died: 1671 (aged 42–43); Kashmir Subah, Mughal Empire
- Writing career
- Years active: 1635–1666
- Notable work: Shahjahannama

Muhammad Tahir (1628 – 1671) known by his title Inayat Khan, was an Indian historian during the Mughal Empire. In his work the Shahjahannama, he chronicled the life of Mughal emperor Shah Jahan.

== Early life ==
Inayat Khan was born in 1628, the same year that Mughal emperor Shah Jahan came to the throne. In 1635, the seventh year of his life, he received as he informs us, "a suitable mansab". He was sent to join his father in Kashmir while he was Mughal governor there. He was afterwards a "Darogha" and subsequently had an office in the Imperial Library.

== Family ==
Zafar Khan, father of Inayat Khan was Wazir of Jahangir. In the reign of Shah Jahan, he was at one time ruler of Kabul, and afterwards of Kashmir, during which latter government he effected the conquest of Tibet. Later period, he was appointed to the administration of Thatta. He was celebrated as a poet, as a patron of letters, and as a just and moderate ruler.

Inayat Khan's maternal grandfather, Saif Khan, was governor of Agra, and when Shah Shuja (Mughal prince) appointed ruler of Bengal and Bihar in 1641, Saif Khan was sent thither to conduct the administration until the arrival of the Shah Shuja (Mughal prince).

== Later days ==
Inayat Khan was a close friend of Shah Jahan. After retirement he settled in Kashmir, where he died in 1666.
