= Pink Legacy =

Pink diamond

- Type of stone: diamond
- Weight: 18.96 carats (3.792 g)
- Dimensions: 17.64 mm × 14.47 mm × 8.64 mm
- Color: Fancy Vivid Pink, VS1 clarity
- Cut: cut-cornered rectangular
- Country of origin: South Africa
- Discovered: c. 1918
- Estimated value: 50.375 million Swiss francs

The Pink Legacy is a pink diamond that was purchased by Harry Winston, Inc. in 2018. It was renamed Winston Pink Legacy by CEO Nayla Hayek. The diamond was sold at a Christie's auction for 50.375 million Swiss francs ($50m), and at $2.6 million per carat it set a world record at the time of its sale for a pink diamond.

Pink Legacy was mined in South Africa around 1918 and was once owned by the Oppenheimer family, who ran De Beers. It has a cut-cornered rectangular cut, and has likely not been altered since it was first cut in 1920. It is mounted in a platinum ring.

== See also ==
- Darya-ye Noor
- Graff Pink
- List of diamonds
- Pink Star (diamond)
