= Lesotho Promise =

Diamond

The Lesotho Promise, a 603 carat (121 g) diamond stone of exceptional colour was unearthed on 22 August 2006 at the Letseng diamond mine in the mountain kingdom of Lesotho. Announced on 4 October 2006, it was the largest reported find this century and the 15th largest diamond ever found. The stone is rated 'D', the top colour band for diamonds.

The diamond was sold at an auction on 9 October 2006 in Antwerp, Belgium, for US$12.4 million. The buyer, The South African Diamond Corporation (SAFDICO), expected to sell the diamond for more than US$20 million after cutting.

In July 2007 the finished stones were unveiled. The largest gem cut from the crystal is a 75 carats (15.0 g) pear-shaped diamond, and the smallest is a 0.55 carats (0.110 g) round brilliant. In all, twenty-six stones were fashioned from the rough gem, figuring as seven pear shapes, four emerald cuts, thirteen round brilliants and one heart shape. The finished gems total 224 carats (44.8 g).

The Lesotho Brown (usually simply called the Lesotho) at 601 carats (120 g) was the largest diamond previously found at the mine.

== See also ==
- List of famous diamonds
