= Matryoshka (diamond) =

First discovered double diamond gemstone

- Weight: 0.62 carats (0.124 g)
- Color: Colorless
- Country of origin: Russia
- Mine of origin: Nakynskoye field
- Discovered: October 2019
- Cut by: Raw
- Estimated value: Never put on sale

The Matryoshka (Russian: Алмаз-матрёшка) is a double diamond, one with a second diamond moving freely inside. It was mined in Yakutia at the Nyurba mining and processing division of Alrosa.

== Double diamond ==
Due to its features, the stone resembles a traditional Russian Matryoshka doll. Experts who studied the find claimed that this was the first such diamond in the history of world diamond mining until October 2019. The maximum size of the diamond is 4.8 × 4.9 × 2.8 mm. The volume of the internal cavity is 6 mm^{3}. The internal crystal volume is 1.6 mm^{3} with an estimated weight of 0.02 carats (0.004 grams). The inner diamond has a flat shape, its size is 1.9 × 2.1 × 0.6 mm.

The diamond was discovered during the sorting process by the specialists of the Yakut Diamond Trading Company (YDTC). Specialists handed it over to the Research and Development Geological Enterprise of Alrosa. At the Enterprise, diamond was studied by a complex of methods, including Raman spectroscopy and infrared spectroscopy, as well as X-ray microtomography. As a result of the research, it was concluded that the inner diamond appeared before the external diamond. How an external diamond formed is not entirely clear. Two hypotheses are proposed to explain the formation of an external diamond. Alrosa plans to send the Matryoshka diamond to the Gemological Institute of America for further analysis.

== Second double diamond ==
In October 2021, Australian mining junior India Bore Diamond Holdings announced the discovery of a second double diamond (0.844 carats) extracted from its Ellendale alluvial deposit in Western Australia.

== See also ==
- List of diamonds
