= Lesedi La Rona =

4th largest diamond, found 2015

- The Lesedi La Rona in 2015
- Weight: 1,111 carats (222.2 g; 7.14 ozt)
- Dimensions: 65 mm × 56 mm × 40 mm (2.6 in × 2.2 in × 1.6 in)
- Colour: Colourless/white, type IIa
- Cut: Raw
- Country of origin: Botswana
- Mine of origin: Karowe Mine
- Discovered: 16 November 2015
- Original owner: Lucara Diamond
- Owner: Graff

Lesedi La Rona, formerly known in media as Karowe AK6 or as Quad 1 by the personnel at the mine, is the fifth-largest diamond ever found, and the third-largest of gem quality. It was found in the Karowe mine, (formerly called AK6) in Botswana on 16 November 2015.

British jeweller Graff bought the rough diamond for $53 million in 2017. By April 2019, Graff had cut it into one large emerald cut diamond, the Graff Lesedi La Rona, weighing 60.5 grams; 2.1 ounces; 1.9 troy ounces (302.37 carats) and 66 smaller stones.

== Description ==
The Lesedi La Rona is a colourless/white, type IIa diamond. It weighs 222.2 g; 7.84 oz (1,111 carats) and measures 65 mm × 56 mm × 40 mm (2.6 in × 2.2 in × 1.6 in). In comparison, the Cullinan, discovered in 1905 in South Africa, weighed 621.4 g (3,106.75 carats). The Lesedi La Rona was mined using Large Diamond Recovery ("LDR") XRT machines, and is the largest diamond recovered using machines for automated diamond sorting. It is estimated to be over 2.5 billion years old.

It was found on 16 November 2015, in the South Lobe of the Karowe mine about 200 m (660 ft) below the surface, and the find was announced on 18 November. A day after the discovery, two more diamonds weighing 813 and 374 carats (162.6 and 74.8 g) were found in the mine. Since the AK6 pipe was opened 18 months earlier, it has yielded over 1,000,000 carats (200 kg) of diamonds.

The stone was too big for the company's scanners.

== Name ==
The diamond was first given a generic name after the mine (Karowe) and the pipe (AK6) where it was found. On 18 January 2016, Chief Executive Officer William Lamb of Lucara Diamond announced a competition, open to all Botswana citizens, to name the stone. In addition to naming the diamond the winner would receive P25,000 (about $2,170).

On 9 February 2016, Lucara Diamond announced that the stone had been named Lesedi La Rona which means "Our Light" in the Tswana language. The winner of the competition who named the diamond was Thembani Moitlhobogi from Mmadikola. He stated that his reason for the name was that "the diamond is a pride, light and hope of Botswana". During the competition Lucara Diamond Corporation received 11,000 emails and 1,000 SMSs with name suggestions.

== History ==
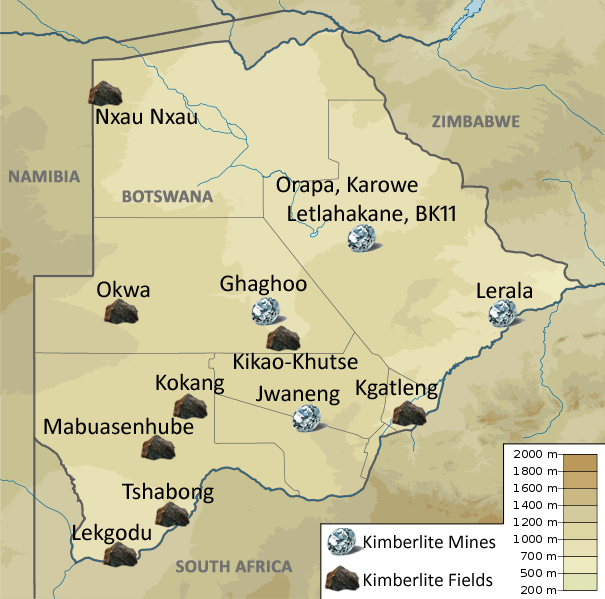
Diamond mines and kimberlite fields in Botswana

The diamond was found in the south lobe of Canadian company Lucara Diamond's Karowe Mine about 500 km (310 mi) north of Gaborone in Botswana. The mine is located in the Letlhakane region, where three other diamond-producing kimberlite fields have mines named Orapa, Letlhakane and Damtshaa, operated by the Debswana Diamond Company Ltd. The first diamond from the mine was retrieved in 2012. Botswana, South Africa and Namibia are the world's three top producers of mined diamonds.

In the months after its discovery the diamond was exhibited on a world tour in Singapore, Hong Kong, New York, and Antwerp, a major centre of the world diamond trade.

=== Value, first auction and sale ===
The exact value of the stone cannot be determined until it is decided how it will be cut and more details about its colour are known. Former diamond-mining geologist Phil Swinfen estimates, based on other similar sales, that the stone could be sold for $40–60 million. The process of selling and cutting the diamond "will likely take years to complete". In May 2016, Sotheby's in London announced that the Lesedi La Rona diamond would be offered in a stand-alone auction on 29 June 2016. It was expected to sell for around $70 million. After closer examination, the diamond was presented at the auction as weighing 221.8 g (1,109 carats). The highest bid for the diamond was $61 million. However, this bid fell short of the undisclosed reserve price and the stone was not sold. The bidding opened at $50 million and the auction lasted for less than 15 minutes.

In June 2016, Lesedi La Rona was insured for $120 million. It was sold in September 2017 for $53 million to British jeweller Graff Diamonds.

=== Cutting ===
On 10 April 2019, jeweller Graff presented the stones cut from Lesedi La Rona. It was divided into one large and 66 smaller diamonds. Due to the size of the rough stone, Graff had to custom-build a new scanner with new imaging software to analyze it for the cutting. The main stone, named the Graff Lesedi La Rona, is the world's largest emerald-cut diamond. It is a D-color (totally colorless), high-clarity stone weighing 302.37 carats (60.474 g; 2.1332 oz). According to Graff, the stone is the "largest highest clarity, highest color diamond ever graded by the Gemological Institute of America (GIA)". The other 66 stones cut from the original Lesedi La Rona range in size from 26 carats (5.2 g; 0.18 oz) to below one carat (0.20 g; 0.0071 oz). Each stone is inscribed with “Graff, Lesedi La Rona” and a specific GIA number.

== Technology ==
The diamond was recovered by a TOMRA large diamond recovery (LDR) machine utilizing X-ray transmission sensors. In May 2015, the operation at the Karowe Diamond Mine replaced their Dense Media Separation (DMS) technology with six TOMRA XRT sorters for sorting material in the -60+8 mm size range. The X-ray transmission (XRT) sorting technology was selected following a suite of tests. Each sorter can sort up to 150 tonnes (330,000 lb) of material per hour, after that the concentrate goes directly to hand sorting. Karowe Diamond Mine is the first mine using this automated diamond sorter.

== See also ==
- List of diamonds
- List of largest rough diamonds
