= Archduke Joseph (diamond) =

Cushion-shaped diamond weighing 78.54 carats

The Archduke Joseph is a colorless, antique cushion-shaped brilliant, originally weighing 78.54 carat, purchased by Molina Jewelers of Arizona sometime in the late-1990s and slightly re-cut to 76.45 carat to improve clarity and symmetry. It is, on the Gemological Institute of America (GIA) color and clarity scales, a D grade (colorless to the highest grade), IF (Internally Flawless, flawless to the second highest grade) diamond (in short: a DIF or a DIF diamond) and the largest DIF ever graded at the GIA; and it is of type IIa (as determined by the Gübelin Gem Lab of Lucerne, Switzerland).

== History ==
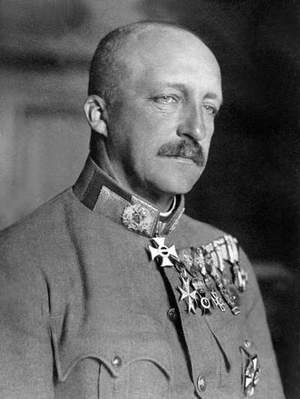
The Archduke Joseph was named after its first recorded owner, Archduke Joseph August of Austria (~1916)

The Archduke Joseph originated in India's Golconda mines, where the colorless Koh-i-Noor, the blue Hope Diamond and other famous diamonds also originated. It was named after Archduke Joseph August of Austria, its first recorded owner who had it deposited in the vault of the Hungarian General Credit Bank on 1 June 1933 in the presence of a State Counselor. This was the first record of the existence of the Archduke Joseph diamond. How it made its way into the ownership of Archduke Joseph August of Austria is not known. In 1936 it was sold to an anonymous buyer who is believed to have been a European banker and kept in France, locked away in a safe deposit box, where it remained undiscovered from the German occupation powers during World War II. It surfaced at auction (but not sold) in 1961 in London and again at Christie's in Geneva in November 1993. On 13 November 2012 the Archduke Joseph (76.02 carat) was sold for more than 20m Swiss frank ($21,474,525 including commission) at Christie's auction house by Alfredo J. Molina, chairman of California-based jeweler Black, Starr & Frost, to an anonymous bidder. The price was $6m above the $15m pre-sale estimate and more than three times the price of $6.5m it reached when it was last sold in 1993. The price fetched was a world record for a Golconda diamond and a world record price per carat for a colorless diamond.

== See also ==
- List of diamonds
