= List of diamonds =

Notable individual diamonds

Diamonds occur naturally and vary in size, color, and quality, so the largest of a particular color may not be large in absolute terms, but may still be considered very desirable. Diamonds may also have high valuations in sale prices, and large ones invariably have a noteworthy ownership history. There is no agreed-upon measure of a large or a high-quality diamond, and new ones displace others on any subjective list, so strict inclusion criteria for notable diamonds are not attainable.

== List of prominent diamonds ==
Name	Uncut weight (carat)	Cut weight (carat)	Color	Country/region of origin	Description	Image
4 February Stone (The Art of de GRISOGONO)	404.2	163.41	white	Angola	27th largest white diamond found (at that time), and largest diamond from Angola, the 404 carats (80.8 g) 4 February diamond was found in early February 2016, and was cut into a 163 carats (32.6 g) flawless D-color emerald-shaped stone.	—
26th Congress of the Communist Party of the Soviet Union	342.57		yellow	Russia / USSR	Mined at the Mir kimberlitic pipe (Yakutia, Russia) in 1980. It is the second largest gem diamond ever found in Russia or the former USSR. It is the size of a pigeon's egg and is currently kept (as of 2016) in the Russian Diamond Fund (Moscow Kremlin).	—
80th anniversary of Victory in the Great Patriotic War	468.3		amber	Russia	Mined at the Verkhne-Munskoye diamond mine (Yakutia, Russia) in 2025. It is the largest gem diamond ever found in Russia or the former USSR (as of 2025).	—
Akbar Shah	116	71.7	colorless	India	An Indian diamond which became famous during the days of the Mughal Empire. A diamond with a roughly pear-shaped outline and random faceting, including two Persian inscriptions, the first reading "Shah Akbar, the Grand King, 1028 A.H." (the letters mean Anno Hegirae). The second inscription read "To the Lord of Two Worlds, 1039 A.H. Shah Jehan". The diamond was reportedly part of the original Peacock Throne. Purchased in 1886 in Istanbul by London merchant George Blogg, who re-cut it from 116 carats (23.2 g) to a pear-shape of 71.70 carats (14.340 g), thus destroying the historic inscriptions. Blogg sold the stone in 1887 to Malhar Rao Gaekwad of Baroda, India who was the last known owner and the stone's whereabouts are presently unknown.	—
Alexander Pushkin	320.65		colorless	Russia / USSR	Mined at the Udachnaya kimberlitic pipe (Yakutia, Russia) in 1989. It is the third largest gem diamond ever found in Russia or the former USSR and is currently kept (as of 2016) in the Russian Diamond Fund (Moscow Kremlin.)	—
Allnatt Diamond		101.29	yellow	South Africa (disputed)	A 101.29-carat (20.258 g) antique cushion-shaped brilliant fancy vivid yellow diamond which is believed to have been found in the Premier mine in the South African Republic. It got the name Allnatt after one of its owners, Major Alfred Ernest Allnatt. The diamond was sold for a little more than $3 million at Christie's auction in Geneva in May 1996.	Allnatt
Amarillo Starlight	16.37	7.54	colorless	United States	The largest diamond found by a park visitor in the Crater of Diamonds State Park in Arkansas since 1972, when it was established as a state park. It was found by W. W. Johnson of Amarillo, Texas in 1975 and was a 16.37 carats (3.27 g) white diamond, but it has since been cut into a 7.54 carats (1,510 mg) marquise shape.	—
Amsterdam Diamond		33.74	black	Africa	A 33.74 carat (6.748 g) pear-shaped black diamond which sold for $352,000 in 2001.	—
Archduke Joseph	78.54	76.02	colorless	India	Historical cushion-shaped, D color, internally flawless Golconda diamond, sold on 13 November 2012 by Christies to an anonymous buyer for US$21.4M.	—
Argyle Pink Jubilee	12.76	8.01	pink	Australia	Argyle Pink Jubilee is the largest pink diamond ever found in Australia weighing 12.76 carats. The diamond was found in Western Australia in Argyle Mine who is the largest producer of pink diamonds in the world.	—
Ashberg Diamond		102.48	amber	South Africa	102.48 carats (20.496 g)	—
Aurora Butterfly of Peace				Russia South Africa Brazil Australia	A display of 240 fancy-colored diamonds.	The 240 diamonds
Aurora Pyramid of Hope					A display of 296 diamonds of natural colors.	The 296 diamonds
Beau Sancy		34.98	colorless	India	A 34.98-carat (6.996 g) pear-shaped diamond, which sold for US$10 million in 2012. Not to be confused with the Sancy.	Beau Sancy
Black Orlov also known as the Eye of Brahma Diamond	195	67.50	black	India	A 67.50-carat (13.500 g) cushion-cut black diamond, also called the Eye of Brahma Diamond.	Black Orlov
Blue Heart Diamond	102	30.62	blue	South Africa	The world's fifth largest blue diamond.	—
Blue Moon of Josephine	29.6	12.03	blue	South Africa	Found in the Cullinan mine in 2014, cushion-shaped, and originally named the 'Blue Moon' diamond. Purchased for a record breaking 48.6 million Swiss francs (US48.4 million) at a Sotheby's auction in Geneva on 11 November 2015 by the Hong Kong tycoon Joseph Lau. He renamed it "The Blue Moon of Josephine" in honor of his daughter. The previous day he had bought the 'Sweet Josephine' diamond for her.	Blue Moon of Josephine
Briolette of India		90.38	colorless	India (See article)	90.38 carats (18.076 g) - cut by Cartier around 1910. Thought to have been owned by Eleanor of Aquitaine in the early 12th century, by King Richard the Lion Heart who carried it during the third crusade, and King Henry II of France, which makes the Briolette of India the oldest diamond on record in the world, even older than the famous Koh-i-Noor.	—
Brunswick Blue		44.25	blue		May be a part of the Tavernier Blue.	—
Centenary Diamond	599	273.85	colorless	South Africa	273.85 carats (54.770 g), modified heart-shaped brilliant, the world's largest colorless (grade D), flawless diamond.	—
Chloe Diamond		84.37	colorless	Angola	Sold in November 2007 at Sotheby's in Geneva to Georges Marciano of the Guess clothing line for 18.2 million SFr, the second-highest price ever paid for a diamond at auction.	—
Cora Sun-Drop Diamond		110.03	yellow	South Africa	Largest known pear-shape fancy vivid yellow diamond, found in South-Africa	—
Creator	298.48		colored	Russia	Found in a placer mining factory in the Lower Lena River area, Yakutia, in 2004. It is the third largest gem diamond ever found in Russia or the former USSR and is currently kept (as of 2016) in the Russian Diamond Fund (Moscow Kremlin.)	—
Cross of Asia	280	79.12	yellow	South Africa	Discovered in 1902 at the Jagersfontein Mine as a 280-carat (56 g) crystal. The first cut was to 142 carats (28.4 g); it was then cut three more times until, in 1993, it was a 79.12 carats (15.824 g) radiant-cut with table facets that resemble a Maltese cross.	—
Cullinan Diamond	3106.75		colorless	South Africa	When discovered in 1905 the 3106.75 carat (621.35 g) Cullinan was the largest rough gem-quality diamond ever found. It was cut into 105 diamonds including the Cullinan I or the Great Star of Africa, 530.2 carats (106.04 g), and the Cullinan II or the Second Star of Africa, 317.4 carats (63.48 g), both of which are now part of the British Crown Jewels.	Cullinan (uncut)
Cullinan I	3106.75	530.4	colorless	South Africa	The largest stone obtained from Cullinan diamond. Cullinan I or Great Star of Africa, with a weight of 530.4 carats, is the third largest cut diamond in the world. Currently located in the head of the Sovereign's Sceptre of the British Crown Jewels.	Cullinan I (replica)
Cullinan II	3106.75	317.4	colorless	South Africa	The second largest stone obtained from Cullinan diamond. Cullinan II or Second Star of Africa, with a weight of 317.4 carats, is also one of the largest cut diamonds in the world. As Cullinan I, it is also in the British Crown Jewels located in the Imperial State Crown.	Great Star of Africa
Cullinan III	3106.75	94.4	colorless	South Africa	The third largest stone obtained from Cullinan diamond. Cullinan III or Lesser Star of Africa, with a weight of 94.4 carats, is also part of the British Crown Jewels. No longer mounted in any of the crowns, it is frequently worn in combination with Cullinan IV as a brooch.	—
Daria-i-Noor		26	white	India	Approximately 26 carats (5.2 g), originally from India but now in the vault of Sonali Bank in Dhaka, Bangladesh.	
Darya-ye Noor		182	pink	India	The largest pink diamond in the world, approximately 182 carats (36.4 g), originally from India but now part of Iranian Crown Jewels. Its exact weight is not known; 182 carats (36.4 g) is an estimate.	The Daria-i-Noor
DeBeers Diamond	440	234.5		South Africa	Discovered in 1888.	—
Deepdene		104.52	yellow	South Africa	Widely considered to be the largest artificially irradiated diamond in the world, at 104.52 carats (20.904 g).	—
DeYoung Red Diamond		5.03	brownish-red	South Africa	Weighing 5.03 carats (1.006 g), the third-largest known red diamond GIA graded as "fancy dark reddish brown", was bought in a flea market on a hatpin by Sidney deYoung a prominent Boston estate jewelry merchant. It was donated by him to the Smithsonian Institution National Museum of Natural History.	DeYoung Red
Dresden Green Diamond		40.70	green	India	41-carat (8.2 g) antique pear-shaped brilliant - its color is the result of natural irradiation	Dresden Green (glass replica)
Eagle Diamond	ab. 16			United States		—
Earth Star Diamond	248.9	111.59	brown	South Africa	a 111.59-carat (22.318 g) pear-shaped diamond with a strong coffee-like brown color.	—
Empress Eugénie	~100	51		Brazil	51-carat (10.2 g) oval-shaped brilliant diamond, perfectly cut.	—
English Dresden	119.5	76.5		Brazil	Found in 1857	—
The Enigma	-	555.55	black	either Brazil or the Central African Republic	A 555-carat black diamond, cut to have 55 sides, is currently the largest cut diamond on Earth. It went on sale in Sotheby's in February 2022. Sotheby's claims that it may originate from a meteor, though this claim is disputed.	—
Esperanza Diamond	8.52	4.602	D IF	United States	Discovered in 2015, it is the 5th largest diamond ever discovered at the Crater of Diamonds State Park, Arkansas Identified as a Type IIa crystal, the 8.52 carat diamond was cut and polished by Mike Botha into a custom-designed 4.605 carat Triolette shape during a week long event in North Little Rock and was graded a D IF, 0 Polish & 0 Symmetry by the American Gem Society Laboratories- making it the most valuable American diamond.	Esperanza
Eureka Diamond	21.25	10.73	yellow-brown	South Africa	the first diamond found in South Africa, a yellow-brown 21.25-carat (4.250 g) stone (before cutting) resulting in a finished diamond 10.73 carats (2.146 g).	Eureka
Excelsior Diamond	995.2		colorless	South Africa	The largest known diamond in the world prior to the Cullinan at 970 carats (194 g), it was later cut into 10 pieces of various sizes (13–68 carats).	Excelsior Diamond (depiction)
Florentine Diamond		137.27	yellow	India	Thought lost for a century, this diamond's location in a safety deposit box in a Canadian bank was revealed in the fall of 2025. Light yellow with a weight of 137.27 carats (27.45 g).	Florentine (glass replica)
Fortuna Diamond		26.29	colorless	India	A cushion-shaped diamond set into a pendant with a 0.75ct Argyle pink diamond, and 4.5 carats of Argyle pinks. The stone has been given a name to fit its history, rarity and setting – the Fortuna Diamond. Classified as a Type 2A with a color grade of I and clarity grade of VVS2.	—
Fortune Pink		18.18	pink	Brazil	Pear-shaped fancy vivid pink diamond sold for 28.4 million Swiss francs ($28.8 million), including fees and taxes, in 2022. It had been mined in Brazil over 15 years ago.	—
French Blue (or Tavernier Blue before its cut)	112	69	blue	India	(Stolen during French Revolution) Largest blue diamond allegedly discovered up to this date before its cut, it was faceted by Jean Pittan to be the main French Crown Jewel. Stolen, and then almost certainly cut into the Hope Diamond.	—
Golden Dawn	133	61.5		South Africa / Vaal River	Found in 1913, cut into an American cut brilliant.	—
Golden Eye Diamond		43.51	yellow	South Africa	A large, radiant-cut fancy intense yellow diamond (43.5 carats).	Golden Eye
Golden Jubilee Diamond	755.5	545.67	yellow-brown	South Africa	The Unnamed Brown as originally named, the Golden Jubilee is the second largest faceted diamond ever cut at 545.67 carats (109.13 g), outweighing Cullinan I by 15.27 carats	Golden Jubilee
Graff Lesedi La Rona	1111	302.37	colorless	Botswana	A 302.37 carat D color high-clarity emerald cut diamond. It is the main stone cut from the Lesedi La Rona, bought by Graff in 2017 and cut in 2019. The cutting of the rough stone also produced 66 smaller stones. According to Graff, the stone is the "largest highest clarity, highest color diamond ever graded by the Gemological Institute of America (GIA)".	-
Graff Pink		24.78	pink	India	24.78-carat (4.956 g) A 24.78-carat Fancy Intense Pink diamond and, until the sale of the Sweet Josephine diamond in November 2015, it was the most expensive jewel ever sold at auction. Previously owned by Harry Winston and an unnamed private collector, and bought by Laurence Graff (November 2010).	—
Grand Condé		9.01	pink	India	A rare light pink pear-shaped diamond of 9.0, sold by Jean-Baptiste Tavernier to King Louis XIII of France, who probably gave it to Louis, Grand Condé	—
Great Chrysanthemum Diamond		104.15	orange-brown	South Africa	104.15 carats (20.830 g).	—
Great Mogul Diamond	780	280		India	Fabled 280-carat (56 g) mogul-cut diamond, now lost, although presumed by historians to have been re-cut as the Orlov.	Great Mogul (replica)
Gruosi Diamond	300.12	115.34	black	India	A heart-shaped black diamond, weighing 115.34 carats (23.068 g).	—
Heart of Eternity Diamond		27.64	blue	South Africa	Perhaps the largest fancy vivid blue, weighing 27.64 carats (5.528 g).	—
Hope Diamond	112	45.52	blue	India	45.52 carats (9.104 g), is a Fancy Dark Grayish-Blue diamond and supposedly cursed. Almost certainly cut from the French Blue Diamond. Part of the Smithsonian Collection.	Hope
Hortensia Diamond		21.32	peach	India	Peach (slightly orangey pink) color, formerly part of the French Crown Jewels. Displayed in the Louvre.	Hortensia
Incomparable Diamond	890	407.48	brownish-yellow	Democratic Republic of Congo	A brownish-yellow diamond of 407.48 carats (81.496 g) cut from an 890 carat (178 g) rough diamond of the same name - it appeared on eBay in 2002. Internally Flawless clarity. Several other smaller diamonds were also cut from the crystal.	—
Jacob Diamond		184.5	colorless	India	Cushion cut weighing 184.5 carats (36.90 g); also known as Imperial Diamond & Victoria Diamond.	Jacob
Jagersfontein Diamond	215			South Africa	Found in 1881 at the Jagersfontein Mine.	—
The Jane Seymour		2.08	blue	Russia	Cushion cut weighing 2.08 carats (416 mg).	—
Jones Diamond		34.48	blueish-white	United States	Weighing 34.48 carats (6.896 g), found in West Virginia by the Jones family. Also known as the Punch Jones Diamond.	—
Jubilee Diamond	650.8	245.35	colorless	South Africa	Originally known as the Reitz Diamond; perhaps the sixth-largest in the world at 245.35 carats (49.070 g).	Jubilee
Kazanjian Red Diamond	35	5.05	brownish-red	South Africa	A 5.05-carat (1.010 g) Emerald-cut red diamond formerly known simply as "Red Diamond". This is the second-largest known red diamond. It was cut from a 35-carat (7.0 g) piece of boart discovered near Lichtenburg, South Africa. It reappeared in 2007 after a 37-year absence from sight, and was purchased by Kazanjian Brothers Inc.	—
Koh-i-Noor	793	105.60	colorless	India	A 105.6 carat (21.6 g) white of Indian origin-(Golconda diamonds), with a long and turbulent history and a good deal of legend surrounding it. After belonging to Kakatiya, Delhi Sultanate, Mughal, Persian, Afghan and Sikh rulers, it was surrendered in the 1849 Treaty of Lahore to Queen Victoria. It was recut from 191 ct, to its current size, and was part of the Crown of Queen Elizabeth the Queen Mother until her death in 2002. It is now on display in the Jewel House at the Tower of London.	Koh-i-noor (replica)
Koi Diamond		32+	white, orange and various	Congo	The colors of this sole and unique 32+ carat diamond evokes the well-known Koi fish legend and sacred symbolism cherished by East Asians. The graduations of color of white, orange, light yellow, darkblue and black colors in this diamond are reminiscent of ancient Chinese brush painting. The Koi Diamond has been certified by the GIA (Gemological Institute of America).	Koi
Lesotho Brown	601	71.73	pale brown	Lesotho	Was a stone originally 601 carats (120.2 g) with the largest stone 71.73 carats (14.346 g) after cutting.	—
Lesotho Legend	910		D (colorless) Type IIa	Lesotho	Largest diamond yet found at the Letšeng mine. Sold in March 2018 for $40 million to an unknown buyer in Antwerp, Belgium.	Lesotho Legend
Lesotho Promise	603	75	colorless	Lesotho	Is the 15th-largest diamond, the tenth-largest white diamond, and the largest diamond to be found in 13 years. The original stone was 603 carats (120.6 g), although the largest diamond after the cutting was 75 carats (15.0 g).	—
Lulo Rose	170		Pink	Angola	The Lulo Rose is a Type IIa diamond, which is considered to be the finest and most rare. The announcement of the discovery was made by Lucapa Diamond Company on 27 July 2022. SODIAM, the subsidiary of Endiama, a state-owned diamond company in Angola, will put the pink diamond up for auction via an international bidding process.	—
Martian Pink		12.04	pink	South Africa	Named by American jeweler Ronald Winston in 1976. Sold by auction in May 2012 for US$17 million, "the largest round fancy intense pink diamond to ever go under the hammer", according to Christie's.	—
Matryoshka	0.62		colorless	Russia	The Matryoshka is a unique diamond with another diamond moving freely inside. This is the first and only such diamond in the entire history of world diamond mining until October 2019.	—
Millennium Star	777	203.04	colorless	Democratic Republic of Congo	At 203.04 carats (40.608 g), this is the second-largest colorless (grade D), flawless diamond.	—
Mirror of Naples					Object of dispute between King Henry VIII of England and King Francis I of France following its gifting to Henry's sister, Mary Tudor, Queen of France.	—
Moon of Baroda	25.95	24.04	yellow	India	Moon of Baroda is pear-shape 24.04 carats (4.808 g) diamond and it was discovered in Vadodara (Baroda) in India.	—
Moussaieff Red Diamond	13	5.11	red	Brazil	The largest known red diamond, at 5.11 carats (1.022 g).	—
Nassak Diamond	89	43.38	blue-white	India	An emerald-cut of 43.38 carats (8.676 g), previously a triangular brilliant of about 89 carats.	—
Nizam Diamond		340	colorless	India	Reportedly 340 carats (68 g). Possibly a large colorless topaz. Whereabouts unknown.	—
Noor-ol-Ain Diamond		60	pink	India	Around 60 carats (12 g) originally from India but now part of the Iranian crown jewels.	Noor-ol-Ain
Ocean Dream Diamond		5.51	blue-green	Central Africa	The only known natural Fancy Deep Blue-Green, and weighs 5.51 carats (1.102 g).	—
Oppenheimer Blue		14.62	blue	South Africa	Became the most expensive diamond in the world at the time of its sale in May 2016, selling for $50.6m (£34.7m).	—
Oppenheimer Diamond	253.7		yellow	South Africa	One of the largest gem-quality uncut diamonds in the world, at 253.7 carats (50.74 g).	Oppenheimer
Orlov		189.62	colorless	India	An Indian mogul cut rumored to have served as the eye of a Hindu statue, and currently is part of the Kremlin diamond fund, weighing approximately 190 carats (38 g).	Orlov
Paragon		137.82	colorless	Brazil	A shield-shaped diamond of 137.82 carats.	—
Pigot Diamond	100 (est.)	47.38	colorless	India	A oval brilliant, once the largest diamond in England. Sold by lottery in 1801, auctioned by Christie's in 1802, current whereabouts unknown although a popular legend is that it was destroyed.	—
Pink Star	132.50	59.60	pink	Africa	Modified oval brilliant cut (step cut crown, brilliant pavilion), largest known fancy vivid pink, at 59.60 carats (11.920 g). Formerly known as the Steinmetz Pink, and the Pink Star. Auctioned in Geneva by Sotheby's in 2013 for $83.187 million	—
Pitt Diamond					See Regent Diamond	—
Polar Star Diamond		41.28	colorless	India	A colorless cushion-shaped stellar brilliant diamond weighing 41.28 carats (8.256 g). Known for its symmetry, and once owned by Napoleon's older brother, it disappeared after being sold to a Sri Lankan diamond merchant in 1980 for a then-record $4.6 million.	—
Portuguese Diamond		127.01	pale yellow	Brazil	127-carat (25.4 g) antique emerald cut with a pale yellow body color and very strong blue fluorescence. Part of the Smithsonian's collection.	Portuguese
Premier Rose Diamond	353.9	137.0	colorless	South Africa	137.02-carat (27.4 g) stone cut from a 353.9-carat (70.8 g) rough gem of the same name.	Premier Rose
Princie Diamond		34.65	pink	India	Antique cushion-cut, fancy intense pink, natural color, VS2 clarity, type IIa, displays bright orangey-red fluorescence when exposed to ultraviolet light (G.I.A.'s lab data); discovered 300 years ago in the Golconda mines.	—
Pumpkin Diamond		5.54	orange	Central African Republic	Perhaps the largest fancy vivid orange diamond (5.54 carats), modified cushion-shaped brilliant.	—
Raven Diamond		12.78	black	-	Trilliant cut black diamond purchased in 2011. The Raven is currently in a private collection in upstate NY.	Raven
Regent Diamond	410	140.64	white with pale blue	India	Weights 140.64 carats (28.128 g), is cushion-shaped stellar brilliant cut, formerly belonging to Louis XV, Louis XVI, and Napoleon Bonaparte, it now resides in the Louvre.	Regent (1907 drawing)
Sancy		55.23	pale yellow	India	A shield-shaped pale yellow diamond currently in the Louvre, weighing 55.23 carats (11.046 g).	Sancy (1907 drawing)
Sergio	3167		carbonado	State of Bahia (Brazil)	Largest carbonado and largest rough diamond ever found. Found in 1895.	Sergio (engraving)
Shah Diamond		88.7	pale yellow	India	Very old pale yellow diamond (found approximately in 1450 in India) currently housed in the Diamond Fund in Kremlin, weighing 88.7 carats (17.74 g).	Shah (depiction on stamp)
Sierra Leone Diamond	709			Sierra Leone	The discovery was made by Pastor Emmanuel Momoh in an artisanal mine in the village of Koyadu in eastern Kono district in 2017	—
Skull Star Diamond		52.4			Pear-shaped pink diamond set in the forehead of Damien Hirst's For the Love of God sculpture.	—
Spirit of de Grisogono Diamond		312.24	black	Central African Republic	Mogul cut, 312 carats (62.4 g), the world's second largest cut black diamond.	Spirit of de Grisogono
Spoonmaker's Diamond		85.8	colorless	-	Circa 86-carat (17 g) diamond housed in Topkapı Palace in Istanbul. Also known as Kaşıkçı Elması	
Star of Sierra Leone	968.9	various	colorless	Republic of Sierra Leone	Cut into smaller pieces, the largest of which is 53.96 carats (10.792 g).	Star of Sierra Leone
Star of South Africa	83.5	47.69	colorless	South Africa	also known as the Dudley Diamond. This must not be confused with the Star of Africa. The Star of South Africa was the initial name given to this diamond, when it was purchased as an 83.5-carat (16.70 g) rough diamond. The diamond is a D-color, pear-shaped stellar brilliant cut stone, weighing 47.69 carats (9.538 g).	—
Star of the East		95	colorless	India (disputed)	A 95-carat (19 g) stone once owned by Evalyn Walsh McLean of Washington, D.C., who also owned the Hope Diamond. It was also owned by King Farouk of Egypt, although he never settled the bill.	—
Star of the Season		100.10	colorless	-	a 100.10-carat (20.020 g) pear-shaped D-color, Internally Flawless stone. At $16,548,750 US in 1995 it held the world record for the highest price paid for a diamond at auction until the sale of the Wittelsbach-Graff diamond in 2008.	—
Star of the South		128.48	light pinkish-brown	Brazil	Found in Brazil in 1853. Cartier is the last known owners of the diamond (mid-2000s).	Star of the South (replica)
Strawn-Wagner Diamond	3.03	1.09	colorless	United States	A diamond which received a "perfect" 0/0/0 rating from the American Gem Society, weighing 3.03 carats (0.606 g) rough and 1.09 carats (0.218 g) cut. On exhibit at Crater of Diamonds State Park in Arkansas, where it was found in 1990.	Strawn-Wagner
Stuart or Holland Diamond		39.75	light blue-green		Pear shaped rose cut diamond. Bought in 1690 as a rough stone by Queen Mary II Stuart, wife of King William of Orange. Therefore, also referred to as the Holland diamond. Belongs to the Dutch Royal House.	—
Sweet Josephine Diamond		16.08	fancy vivid pink		The largest cushion-shaped stone classified in the elite "fancy vivid" category to ever come to auction. Owned by an American family of 15 years, it was sold at auction in November 2015 to Hong Kong billionaire Joseph Lau, and renamed by him the 'Sweet Josephine' after his daughter. The next day he bought the 'Blue Moon of Josephine' diamond for her.	—
Symbolic Yellow Diamond		114.63	vivid yellow	South Africa	Antique cushion-shaped brilliant cut, which is believed to have been found in the Premier mine in The South African Republic. It weighs 114.63 carats (22.926 g).	Symbolic Yellow
Taylor-Burton Diamond	241	68.0	colorless	South Africa	Purchased by Richard Burton for his wife Elizabeth Taylor, weighing 68 carats (13.6 g).	—
Tereshchenko Diamond		42.92	blue	India	42-carat (8.4 g) antique pear brilliant cut.	—
The Rock		228.31	White	South Africa	"The Rock" is about the size of a golf ball and was previously worn as a lavish Cartier necklace. This is a perfectly symmetrical pear-shaped form and one of the rarest gems ever to be sold at auction.	—
Tiffany Yellow Diamond	287.42	128.54	yellow	South Africa	Antique modified cushion-shaped stellar brilliant cut, on display at Tiffany & Co.'s New York City store. It weighs 128.54 carats (25.708 g).	Tiffany Yellow
Uncle Sam	40.23	12.42	brown	United States	The largest discovered in the US, emerald-cut, M color (pale brown), VVS2 clarity.	Uncle Sam
Vargas Diamond	726.6		blue-white	Brazil	Cut into 29 smaller diamonds.	—
Williamson pink diamond	54.5	23.6	pink	Tanzania	Given to Queen Elizabeth II on her wedding in 1947 and later set in a brooch. "The most famous pink diamond in the world" according to the BBC.	—
Williamson Pink Star	32.32	11.15	pink	Tanzania	The cushion-shaped flawless fancy vivid pink type IIa diamond was sold by Sotheby's Hong Kong on October 7, 2022, for $392 million Hong Kong dollars (US$49.9 million), setting a world record for the highest price per carat for a diamond sold at auction.	—
Winston Pink Legacy		18.96	pink	South Africa	The world's largest Fancy Vivid Pink. Previously named Pink Legacy, it was sold by Christies on 13 November 2018, for 50.3 million Swiss francs ($50 million, £38.5 million), to Harry Winston. Found in a South African mine around 100 years ago and has likely not been altered since it was first cut (rectangular cut) in 1920, and once owned by the Oppenheimer family, who ran De Beers.	—
Wittelsbach-Graff Diamond	35.56	31.06	blue	India	31.06 carats (6.212 g), Fancy Deep Blue, cushion modified brilliant. Was cut down from the 35.56 Wittelsbach Blue after being purchased in 2008. At the time of the sale it was the highest price ever paid for a diamond at auction.	Wittelsbach diamond, before being recut by Graff
XUAN Diamond		10.60	Fancy Vivid Blue	Likely sourced from Cullinan Mine in South Africa	Among the rarest unmodified natural blue diamond ever polished. Fancy Vivid Blue color grade (intense hue caused by traces of boron, which also conducts electricity, a rare ability), Internally Flawless clarity and grand size.	

== See also ==
- List of largest rough diamonds
- List of Golconda diamonds
- List of emeralds by size
- List of individual gemstones
- List of gold nuggets by size
- List of pearls by size
- List of sapphires by size
