= Graff Pink =

Rare 24.78 carat pink diamond

- Weight: 24.78 carats (4.956 g)
- Color: Fancy Intense pink
- Cut: Emerald cut
- Owner: Laurence Graff
- Estimated value: US$4

The Graff Pink is a rare 24.78 carat pink diamond, once owned by American celebrity jeweller Harry Winston. The diamond, mounted in a ring, was sold by Sotheby's auctioneers in Geneva, Switzerland on 16 November 2010. Before its sale, the stone was expected to enter the list of the top ten most expensive diamonds in the world; on selling for US $46 million (£29 million) it became the most expensive single jewel ever sold at auction at that time.

== The diamond ==
The gem is classified by the Gemological Institute of America as "fancy intense pink"—a high colour rating for pink diamonds—and has been assessed as Diamond type IIa, placing it in the top two per cent of the world's diamonds.

The early history of the diamond is not clear. It was sold in the 1950s by American celebrity jeweller Harry Winston to a private collector, who owned it up until 2010, when it was sold at auction. Despite its rarity, the diamond was unnamed for all this time. The diamond is emerald cut with rounded corners, and is mounted on a platinum ring with two flanking shield-shaped diamonds.

== 2010 auction ==
The pre-sale estimate for the diamond was US $27 million to US $38 million (£17 million to £24 million). The diamond was shown around the world prior to the auction in Geneva. It sold for US $46 million (£29 million), making it the most expensive single jewel ever sold at auction at the time. It was bought by diamond dealer Laurence Graff, of Graff Diamonds, who named it the Graff Pink.

== See also ==
- List of diamonds
- Darya-ye Noor
- Pink Star (diamond)
