= Cora Sun-Drop Diamond =

Largest known yellow pear-shaped diamond

The Cora Sun-Drop Diamond is the largest known yellow pear-shaped diamond, weighing 110.3 carats (22.06 g). It was sold for $10.9 million at Sotheby's auction in Geneva and set a world record price for a yellow diamond.

== History ==
The Sun-Drop has a very short history. It was found in South Africa in 2010 within a kimberlite pipe. Tests show that the diamond was formed from 1 to 3 billion years ago. After that, on 24 February 2011, it was kept in The Vault of the London Natural History Museum together with many other precious stones, such as the Duke of Devonshire Emerald and the Aurora Pyramid of Hope, where it stayed for six months. In November 2011, it was sold at an auction in Geneva for just over $10.9 million. The stone was cut and owned by the diamond manufacturing company Cora International, based in New York City. It was sold at the auction by Sotheby's. The Sun-Drop was bought by a telephone bidder who decided to remain anonymous. Including commission and taxes the buyer paid $12.36 million. The pre-sale estimate was from 11 to 15 million dollars. "It sold for a record for a yellow diamond ... It was exactly within our expectation for this spectacular stone," said Mr Bennett, an auctioneer.

== Colour ==
The intense yellow colour, or "vivid fancy yellow" as the experts called it, is given to the diamond by molecules of nitrogen that have been trapped in the molecules of carbon and hardened over thousands of years. Yellow is the fifth most rare colour for a diamond, after red, green, blue and pink. Good quality diamonds are termed "fancies" by dealers. Only 1 in 1000 diamonds is good enough body colour to be called fancy.

== Cut ==
The diamond was cut as a pear brilliant, also called drop cut. Suzette Gomes, the chief executive at Cora international said that the cut is vital in bringing out the diamond's beauty. She said: "If the colour is weaker you would cut a square... to keep the colour and make it stronger. If your colour's very strong, you would cut a pear shape." Cutting the Sun-Drop took Cora International six months.

== See also ==
- List of diamonds
