= Deepdene (diamond) =

- Weight: 104.52 carats (20.904 g)
- Color: Yellow
- Cut: Cushion cut
- Mine of origin: Premier Mine
- Cut by: Harry Winston
- Original owner: Cary W. Bok

The Deepdene is a 104.52-carat (20.904 g) yellow diamond widely considered to be the largest irradiated diamond in the world.

== Origin of the name ==
The Deepdene gets its name from the Pennsylvania estate of Helene Boericke, wife of Cary Bok, both the diamond's original owners. At the time, the Deepdene weighed slightly more at 104.88 carats (20.976 g) and was mounted in a diamond clip. Harry Winston bought the diamond from the Boks in 1954 and it eventually found its way to a London firm in 1960 and later to a German owner.

== Irradiation scandal ==
On 27 May 1971, Christie's auction house in Geneva offered to prospective buyers the cushion-cut, fancy golden-yellow diamond which would only later come to be known as the "Deepdene". Its clarity was stated as VVS1 (with two very small imperfections near the girdle or midsection of the stone) and its vivid-yellow colour was guaranteed to be natural by both the German gemological institute and the University of Mainz.

However, Eduard Gübelin, the founder of Gübelin Gem Lab in Lucerne, Switzerland, had the opportunity to inspect the diamond before the auction took place. Gübelin's experience with examining gemstones and recognizing artificially colored diamonds led him to declare that the Deepdene had been irradiated, likely by neutron bombardment. Gübelin warned Christie's and any buyers who would listen, but the sale was allowed to continue with the recommendation that the stone be examined by another lab.

After being sold to jewelers Van Cleef & Arpels for a reported £190,000 (about US$460,000 at the time), the Deepdene was sent to the Gem Testing Laboratory in London, England. The lab's director, gemological pioneer Basil Anderson, was given the task of substantiating Gübelin's claims. That he did, using spectral analysis, with damning results. Van Cleef & Arpels promptly returned the stone for a refund, leaving it somewhat of an unwanted orphan. In 1997, Christies auctioned the diamond once again, but listed as an irradiated gem with a substantially lower estimate. It sold to Lawrence Graff of Graff Diamonds, who sold it to famed author Danielle Steel. Its current whereabouts remain uncertain.

Assuming Winston did not have the irradiation treatment done, it could have taken place any time between 1955 (when Winston sold it) and 1971, the year it was offered at auction. The recutting of the gem from 104.88 carats (20.976 g) to 104.52 carats (20.904 g) was most likely intended to remove the 'umbrella' coloration pattern it had around its culet. This was a common side effect seen in early irradiated diamonds, but irradiation techniques have been improved so that it no longer occurs.

== See also ==
- List of diamonds
