= Great diamond =

The term great diamond may refer to:

- The Great Diamond asterism/constellation

== Places ==
- Great Diamond, Guyana
- Great Diamond Island, Maine

== Diamonds ==
- Great Chrysanthemum Diamond
- Great Mogul Diamond
