= Aurora Butterfly of Peace =

Butterfly-shaped artwork created with 240 natural colored diamonds 167 carats (33.4 g)

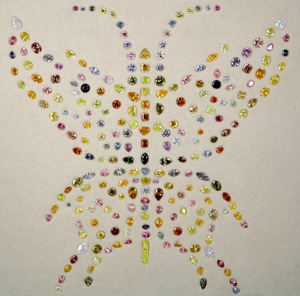
Aurora Butterfly of Peace Diamond Collection in daylight.

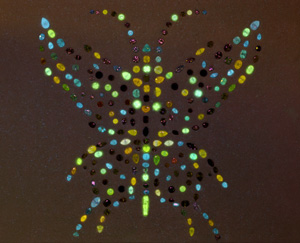
Aurora Butterfly of Peace Diamond Collection in ultraviolet light.

The Aurora Butterfly of Peace diamond collection is an artwork consisting of 240 natural, fancy colored diamonds weighing a combined total of 167 carats (33.4 g). This butterfly-shaped diamond mosaic was created over a period of twelve years by Alan Bronstein and Harry Rodman. The Aurora Butterfly of Peace was conceived as an eternal icon of love, beauty, energy, nature and peace. The work is currently on display at the American Museum of Natural History in New York.

From November 2004 until July 2005, the Butterfly of Peace was exhibited in the National Gem Collection Gallery at the Smithsonian Institution in Washington, D.C.

A smaller version of the Butterfly of Peace was displayed at the Houston Museum of Natural Science from June 1994 to March 1996. The Aurora Butterfly of Peace was on display from May to July 2008 at the Museum of the Gemological Institute of America (GIA), to help launch “The Facets of the GIA” exhibit, which showcases the prominent role of the Institute in the world of gemology.

Two research studies involving the Butterfly of Peace have resulted in new scientific breakthroughs about fluorescence and phosphorescence in colored diamonds. The phenomena of fluorescence can be seen as a skeletal pattern of glowing colors when the diamonds are exposed to ultraviolet light. Some of the diamonds in the design include purples from Russia, blues and oranges from South Africa, lime greens from Brazil, violets and dozens of pinks from the Argyle Mine in Australia.

== See also ==
- List of diamonds
