= Aschberg (disambiguation) =

Aschberg is a mountain on the border of Germany and the Czech Republic.

It may also refer to:

- Aschberg (Schleswig-Holstein), a hill in Germany
- Olof Aschberg (1877–1960), Swedish banker
- Robert Aschberg (born 1952), Swedish journalist

== See also ==
- Achberg, a municipality in Germany
- Ashberg Diamond
