= Black Orlov =

67.50-karat black diamond

Hope Diamond (Eye of Brahma Diamond)
- Weight: 67.5 carats (13.50 g)
- Color: Black
- Country of origin: India

The Black Orlov is a black diamond, also known as the Eye of Brahma Diamond. It weighs 67.50 carats (13.500 g). The diamond—originally 195 carats (39.0 g)—is said to have been stolen in the early 19th century in India. It supposedly featured as one of the eyes in a statue of the Hindu god Brahma in Pondicherry, until it was stolen by a Jesuit cleric. According to legend, this theft caused the diamond to be cursed.

In 1932, diamond dealer J. W. Paris reportedly took the diamond to the United States, and soon after committed suicide by jumping from a skyscraper in New York City. Later owners of the diamond included two Russian princesses, Leonila Galitsine-Bariatinsky and Nadia Vygin-Orlov (after whom the diamond is named). Both women allegedly jumped to their deaths in the 1940s. The diamond was later bought by Charles F. Winson, and cut into three pieces in an attempt to break the curse; the 67.5-carat Black Orlov was set into a brooch of 108 diamonds, suspended from a necklace of 124 diamonds. The diamond was purchased by diamond dealer Dennis Petimezas in 2004; Petimezas said he was "pretty confident that the curse is broken". The Black Orlov has been displayed at the American Museum of Natural History in New York City and the Natural History Museum in London.

== See also ==
- List of diamonds
