= Oppenheimer Blue =

14.62 carat vivid blue diamond

- Weight: 14.62 carats (2.924 g)
- Color: Fancy Vivid Blue
- Cut: Emerald Cut (Rectangular Step Cut)
- Owner: Moza del Qatar (was Philip Oppenheimer)
- Estimated value: $50.6 million

The Oppenheimer Blue is a 14.62-carat (2.924 g) vivid blue diamond that in May 2016 became the most expensive jewel ever sold at auction, until April 2017 when it was surpassed by the Pink Star diamond.

The diamond was named for its previous owner Philip Oppenheimer. It is cut into a rectangle (emerald cut). The Oppenheimer Blue is the largest fancy vivid blue diamond classified by the Gemological Institute of America ever sold at auction; it sold at Christie's in Geneva in May 2016 for US$50.6 million (GBP 34.7m; 56.83m SFr). Two telephone bidders had competed for the diamond; the identity of the purchaser is not publicly known.

== See also ==
- List of diamonds
