= Archduke Joseph =

Archduke Joseph may refer to:

- Archduke Joseph, Palatine of Hungary (1776–1847), Palatine of Hungary from 1796 to 1847
- Archduke Joseph Árpád of Austria (1933–2017)
- Archduke Joseph August of Austria (1872–1962), regent of Hungary in August 1919
- Archduke Joseph Ferdinand of Austria (1872–1942), titular Grand Duke of Tuscany from 1908 to 1921
- Archduke Joseph Francis of Austria (1895–1957)
- Archduke Joseph Franz of Austria (1799–1807)
- Archduke Joseph Karl of Austria (1833–1905)
- Archduke Joseph (diamond)
