= Great Chrysanthemum Diamond =

Great Chrysanthemum
- Weight: 104.15 carats (20.830 g)
- Color: Fancy Orange-Brown
- Cut: Modified Pear Brilliant
- Country of origin: South Africa
- Mine of origin: Kimberley
- Discovered: 1963
- Cut by: Messr Coster S & M Kaufman
- Original owner: Julius Cohen
- Owner: Anonymous
- Estimated value: $30 million

The Great Chrysanthemum Diamond is a famous diamond measuring 104.15 carats (20.830 g) with a pear-shaped modified brilliant cut, rated in colour as Fancy Orange-Brown and I1 clarity by the Gemological Institute of America. The Great Chrysanthemum is roughly the same size as the re-cut Kohinoor and almost three times the size of the Hope Diamond, The Great Chrysanthemum has the dimensions of 39.10 x 24.98 x 16.00 mm. and features 67 facets on the crown, 57 facets on the pavilion and 65 vertical facets along the girdle. The diamond, designed as a pendant, became the central focus of a necklace with 410 oval, pear-shaped, round and marquis diamonds.

The Great Chrysanthemum, considered one of the most famous diamonds in the world is the 2nd largest pear-shaped brown diamond and the 5th largest of all Fancy brown diamonds in the world.

== History ==
The Great Chrysanthemum Diamond was discovered in 1963 at the Kimberley Mines in the Northern Cape province of South Africa. Weighing in at 198 carats, the rough diamond is one of about only 300 diamonds in the entire world which weigh in excess of a hundred carats. Julius Cohen, one-time protégé of Harry Winston and custodian of the Hope Diamond, purchased the rough stone from its original owners, saving it from the fate of being cut in two. It was Cohen who christened the stone the Great Chrysanthemum, after attending the Chrysanthemum Ball in San Antonio, Texas. When Cohen later learned through Ms. Craggett, his assistant, that the word Chrysanthemum meant "gold flower" in Greek, Cohen made it official.

Under the direction of Cohen, the Great Chrysanthemum was later cut and crafted by S & M Kaufmann of New York. Cohen fashioned the fancy, rich golden-brown stone into a pear-shaped, faceted diamond. A letter dated October 15, 1973 to Julius Cohen from Paul E. Desautels, curator of the Division of Mineralogy of the Smithsonian Institution's National Museum of Natural History, expressed the desire to acquire the Great Chrysanthemum for its, at the time, 15 year old national gem collection. In the letter, Desautels promises that the Great Chrysanthemum would be in good company alongside the famous Hope Diamond, the Portuguese Diamond, and the Eugénie Blue. Cohen eventually brought the Great Chrysanthemum to the Smithsonian for display and attaching it briefly alongside the Hope Diamond.

The Great Chrysanthemum has been shown in a number of diamond exhibits throughout the United States. In 1965, the Chrysanthemum was named a winner of one of the Diamonds International Awards and was placed on display in the Rand Easter Festival in Johannesburg, South Africa. It was one of five featured stones brought out to celebrate the 100th year of discovery of diamonds in the famous Kimberley mines. Julius Cohen initially sold the diamond to an unknown buyer. The diamond returned to the world stage in 2003 when the jeweler to the English royal family, Garrard & Co, purchased the stone. The Great Chrysanthemum was featured prominently in Garrard's 2007 catalogue that also featured Princess Diana's heirloom engagement ring. Since then, it has gone on display once again, most notably in recent years by such high profile personalities as filmmaker and former First Lady of San Francisco, Jennifer Siebel Newsom, who wore the diamond to a “Women of Power” event in 2008. Garrard reportedly sold the Great Chrysanthemum to a foreign anonymous buyer.

== See also ==
- List of diamonds

== Sources ==
- Oakland Tribune. Thurs. February 18, 1965. pg. 22 "540,000 Rings Her Neck"
