= Moon of Baroda =

Diamond discovered in India

The Moon of Baroda is a 24.04 carats (4.808 g) cut diamond discovered in Vadodara (Baroda), India. The diamond, canary yellow in colour, is cut in a pear shape. When found, the rough diamond weighed 25.95 carats (5.190 g). The Moon of Baroda was originally owned by the Maharajas of Baroda. The Gaekwad Maharajas were in possession of the diamond for almost 500 years. The gem was later worn by Empress Maria Theresa of Austria and singer and actress Marilyn Monroe.

== Description ==
The Moon of Baroda weighed 25.95 carats (5.190 g) at the time it was found. It was later cut into a pear shaped diamond, weighing 24.04 carats (4.808 g).

A popular myth associated with the Moon of Baroda is that it brings bad luck to its owner if it is carried across the sea.

== History ==
The Moon of Baroda was originally owned by the royal Gaekwad family, the Maharajas of Baroda. It was later sent by the Gaekwad family to Empress Maria Theresa of Austria, the only female monarch of the Habsburg dynasty. The diamond was returned to the Gaekwad family later, and in 1860, it was fitted to a necklace. Maharaja Sayajirao Gaekwad sold it to an unknown buyer in the early 1920s.

The diamond resurfaced in the 1940s, in 1943, the diamond was purchased by Meyer Rosenbaum of Detroit, President of the Meyer Jewelry Company. Rosenbaum later lent the diamond to Marilyn Monroe, who wore it for the shooting of the song Diamonds Are a Girl's Best Friend, and also in the film Gentlemen Prefer Blondes. The Moon of Baroda was displayed publicly at an exhibition in 1944.

In 2008, the Moon of Baroda was next displayed publicly at the exhibition 'Diamond Divas', organized by the Antwerp World Diamond Centre.

On the 28 August 2012, episode of the Japanese antique appraisal television show Nandemo Kanteidan (松木悌), a Japanese management consultant resident in the US appearing with what he claimed was the Moon of Baroda). Japanese diamond expert, Mr Honma (本間悟郎), authenticated the diamond and appraised it at 100 million Yen.

A number of replicas of the diamond have been made by jewellers and put on display.

== See also ==
- List of diamonds
