= Diamond type =

Diamond classification system

Diamond type is a method of scientifically classifying diamonds by the level and type of their chemical impurities. Diamonds are separated into five types: Type IaA, Type IaB, Type Ib, Type IIa, and Type IIb. The impurities measured are at the atomic level within the crystal lattice of carbon atoms and so, unlike inclusions, require an infrared spectrometer to detect.

Different diamond types react in different ways to diamond enhancement techniques. Different types can coexist within a single stone; natural diamonds are often mixes of Type Ia and Ib, which can be determined by their infrared absorption spectrum, especially using Fourier-transform infrared spectroscopy (FTIR). In this technique, the frequency-dependent absorption of a diamond sample is analzed as different impurities and impurity configurations show characteristic signatures.

== Types of diamond ==
=== Type I ===
Type I diamonds, the most common class, contain nitrogen atoms as their main impurity, commonly at a concentration of 0.1%. Type I diamonds absorb in both the infrared and ultraviolet region, from 320 nm. They also have a characteristic fluorescence and visible absorption spectrum (see Optical properties of diamond).

==== Type Ia ====
Type Ia diamonds make up about 95% of all natural diamonds. The nitrogen impurities, up to 0.3% (3000 ppm), are clustered within the carbon lattice, and are relatively widespread. The absorption spectrum of the nitrogen clusters can cause the diamond to absorb blue light, making it appear pale yellow or almost colorless. Most Ia diamonds are a mixture of IaA and IaB material; these diamonds belong to the Cape series, named after the diamond-rich region formerly known as Cape Province in South Africa, whose deposits are largely Type Ia. Type Ia diamonds often show sharp absorption bands with the main band at 415.5 nm (N3) and weaker lines at 478 nm (N2), 465 nm, 452 nm, 435 nm, and 423 nm (the "Cape lines"), caused by the N2 and N3 nitrogen centers. They also show blue fluorescence to long-wave ultraviolet radiation due to the N3 nitrogen centers (the N3 centers do not impair visible color, but are always accompanied by the N2 centers which do). Brown, green, or yellow diamonds show a band in the green at 504 nm (H3 center), sometimes accompanied by two additional weak bands at 537 nm and 495 nm (H4 center, a large complex presumably involving 4 substitutional nitrogen atoms and 2 lattice vacancies).

- Type IaA, where the nitrogen atoms are in pairs; these do not affect the diamond's color.
- Type IaB, where the nitrogen atoms are in large even-numbered aggregates; these impart a yellow to brown tint.

==== Type Ib ====
Type Ib make up about 0.1% of all natural diamonds. They contain up to 0.05% (500 ppm) of nitrogen, but the impurities are more diffuse: the atoms are dispersed throughout the crystal in isolated sites. Type Ib diamonds absorb green light in addition to blue, and have a more intense or darker yellow or brown colour than Type Ia diamonds. The stones have an intense yellow or occasionally brown tint; the rare canary diamonds belong to this type, which represents only 0.1% of known natural diamonds. The visible absorption spectrum is gradual, without sharp absorption bands.

=== Type II ===
Type II diamonds have no measurable nitrogen impurities. Type II diamonds absorb in a different region of the infrared, and transmit in the ultraviolet below 225 nm, unlike Type I diamonds. They also have differing fluorescence characteristics. The crystals as found tend to be large and irregular in shape. Type II diamonds were formed under extremely high pressure for longer time periods.

==== Type IIa ====
Type IIa diamonds make up 1–2% of all natural diamonds (1.8% of gem diamonds). These diamonds are almost or entirely devoid of impurities, and consequently are usually colourless and have the highest thermal conductivity. They are very transparent in ultraviolet, down to 230 nm. Occasionally, while Type IIa diamonds are being extruded towards the surface of the Earth, the pressure and tension can cause structural anomalies arising through plastic deformation during the growth of the tetrahedral crystal structure, leading to imperfections. These imperfections can confer a yellow, brown, orange, pink, red, or purple colour to the gem. Type IIa diamonds can have their structural deformations "repaired" via a high-pressure, high-temperature (HPHT) process, removing much or all of the diamond's color. Type IIa diamonds constitute a great percentage of Australian production. Many famous large diamonds, like the Cullinan, Koh-i-Noor, Lesedi La Rona, and The Lulo Rose are Type IIa. Synthetic diamonds grown using the CVD process typically also belong to this type.

==== Type IIb ====
Type IIb diamonds make up about 0.1% of all natural diamonds, making them one of the rarest natural diamonds and very valuable. In addition to having very low levels of nitrogen impurities comparable to Type IIa diamonds, Type IIb diamonds contain significant boron impurities. The absorption spectrum of boron causes these gems to absorb red, orange, and yellow light, lending Type IIb diamonds a light blue or grey color, though examples with low levels of boron impurities can also be colorless. These diamonds are also p-type semiconductors, unlike other diamond types, due to uncompensated electron holes (see Electrical properties of diamond); as little as 1 ppm of boron is enough for this effect. However, a blue-grey color may also occur in Type Ia diamonds and be unrelated to boron. Type IIb diamonds show distinctive infrared absorption spectrum and show gradually increasing absorption towards the red side of visible spectrum.

Not restricted to type are green diamonds, whose color is derived from exposure to varying quantities of ionizing radiation.

Most blue-gray diamonds coming from the Argyle mine of Australia are not of type IIb, but of Ia type; those diamonds contain large concentrations of defects and impurities (especially hydrogen and nitrogen) and the origin of their color is yet uncertain.

== See also ==
- Diamond color
- List of diamonds
