= Star of Sierra Leone =

Large diamond

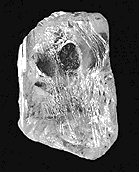
- The Star of Sierra Leone rough diamond
- Weight: 968.9 carats (193.78 g)
- Country of origin: Sierra Leone
- Mine of origin: Diminco mine
- Discovered: Feb 14, 1972
- Cut by: Harry Vos
- Original owner: Purchased by Harry Winston on Oct 3, 1972

The 968.9-carat (193.78 g) Star of Sierra Leone diamond was discovered by miners on February 14, 1972, in the Diminco alluvial mines in the Koidu area of Sierra Leone. It ranks as the fourth-largest gem-quality diamond and the largest alluvial diamond ever discovered.

On October 3, 1972, Sierra Leone's then-President, Siaka Stevens, announced that Harry Winston, the New York City jeweller, had purchased the Star of Sierra Leone for under $2.5 million.

The stone was initially cut into an emerald shaped stone weighing 143.2 carats (28.64 g) but was later re-cut due to an internal flaw, eventually resulting in 17 separate finished diamonds, of which 13 were deemed to be flawless. The largest single finished gem was a flawless pear-shaped diamond of 53.96 carats (10.792 g). Six of the diamonds cut from the original rough were later set by Harry Winston into the "Star of Sierra Leone" brooch.

A rare characteristic of the stone is its perfect chemical purity: it is ranked as a type IIa diamond, a category which includes less than 1% of all diamonds.

== See also ==
- List of diamonds
