= Mmadikola =

- Village
- Location within Botswana
- Coordinates: 21.04010834930°S 24.46649518080°E

Mmadikola is a village located in the Central District of Botswana, near the western edge of the district and close to the Makgadikgadi Pan. The village has a primary school and recorded a population of 828 in the 2001 census. Currently, the population is estimated at around 5,000, with the majority belonging to the Bayei ethnic group, along with smaller communities of Bakalanga, Bananjwa, and Banoka people.

Mmadikola remains a small rural village, with several factors contributing to its modest population. Many residents have migrated due to a lack of industries, the absence of mineral resources, and poor soils unsuitable for both pastoral and arable farming.

In the early 1900s, as part of a colonial "divide and rule" policy, Yeyi people were moved from the Ngami region near Maun to the Central District. According to the elders, some Yeyi people pleaded to be left at Mmadikola, citing their strong cultural and practical connection to water. At the time, Mmadikola was abundant in water, with overflowing rivers, making it a suitable settlement for the Yeyi, whose name translates to "people of the water."

Today, most residents of Mmadikola migrate to larger villages Letlhakane and Orapa, where diamond mining provides employment opportunities.

On 9 February 2016, Thembani Moitlhobogi from Mmadikola, won the competition of naming the second-largest gem-quality diamond ever found. He named the stone Lesedi La Rona which means "Our Light". He stated that his reason for the name was that "the diamond is a pride, light and hope of Batswana". During the competition Lucara Diamond Corporation received 11,000 emails and 1,000 SMSs with name suggestions. In addition to naming the diamond, Moitlhobogi also received P25,000 (about $2,170).
