= Ashberg Diamond =

Cushion-shaped 102.48 carats (20.496 g) amber diamond

- Weight: 102.48 carats (20.496 g)
- Color: Amber
- Cut: Cushion shaped
- Country of origin: South Africa

Ashberg Diamond is a diamond, which was once included in the Russian Crown Jewels. It weighs 102.48 carats (20.496 g).

This is believed to have been mined in South Africa, because of its characteristics. In 1934 the Russian Trade Delegation sold the diamond to Mr. Ashberg, a leading Stockholm banker.

== See also ==
- List of diamonds
