= Diamond enhancement =

Process of making diamonds more attractive

Diamond enhancements are specific treatments, performed on natural diamonds (usually those already cut and polished into gems), which are designed to improve the visual gemological characteristics of the diamond in one or more ways. These include clarity treatments such as laser drilling to remove black carbon inclusions, fracture filling to make small internal cracks less visible, color irradiation and annealing treatments to make yellow and brown diamonds a vibrant fancy color such as vivid yellow, blue, or pink.

The CIBJO and government agencies, such as the United States Federal Trade Commission, explicitly require the disclosure of all diamond treatments at the time of sale. Some treatments, particularly those applied to clarity, remain highly controversial within the industry—this arises from the traditional notion that diamonds hold a unique or "sacred" place among the gemstones, and should not be treated too radically, if for no other reason than a fear of damaging consumer confidence.

Clarity and color enhanced diamonds sell at lower price points when compared to similar, untreated diamonds. This is because enhanced diamonds are originally lower quality before the enhancement is performed, and therefore are priced at a substandard level. After enhancement, the diamonds may visually appear as good as their non-enhanced counterparts.

== Clarity enhancements ==
The clarity, or purity, of a diamond refers to internal inclusions of the diamond, and is one of the 4-Cs in determining a diamond's value. Common inclusions that appear inside diamonds are black carbon spots and small cracks, commonly referred to as fractures or "feathers", due to their feathery whitish appearance when viewed from above or through the side. Diamonds may also have other inclusions such as air bubbles and mineral deposits, such as iron or garnet. The size, color, and position of the inclusions are factors in determining the value of a diamond, especially when the other gemological characteristics are of a higher standard.

=== Laser drilling ===
The development of laser drilling techniques has increased the ability to selectively target, remove and significantly reduce the visibility of black carbon inclusions on a microscopic scale. Diamonds containing hematite inclusions have been laser-drilled since the late 1960s, a technique credited to Louis Perlman that did a successful test a year after General Electric had made a similar one with a diamond for industrial use in 1962.

The laser drilling process involves the use of an infrared laser (of surgical grade at a wavelength about 1064 nm) to bore very fine holes (around 0.02 millimeters in diameter) into a diamond to create a route of access to a black carbon crystal inclusion. Because diamond is transparent to the wavelength of the laser beam, a coating of amorphous carbon or other energy-absorbent substance is applied to the surface of the diamond to initiate the drilling process. The laser then burns a narrow tube or channel to the inclusion. Once the location of included black carbon crystal has been reached by the drill channel, the diamond is soaked in sulfuric acid. After soaking in sulfuric acid the black carbon crystal will dissolve and become transparent (colorless) and sometimes slightly whitish opaque. Under microscopic inspection the fine drill or bore holes can be seen, but are not distracting and do not affect sparkle or brilliance of the diamond. While the channels are usually straight in direction, from an entry point on the surface, some drilling techniques are drilled from within, using naturally occurring fractures inside the stone to reach the inclusion in a way that mimics organic "feathers". (This method is sometimes referred to as KM drilling which stands for special drilling in Hebrew.) The channels are microscopic so that dirt or debris cannot travel down the channel. The surface-reaching holes can only be seen by reflecting light off of the surface of the diamond during microscopic viewing such as a jeweler's 10x magnifying lens or loupe and are invisible to the naked eye.

=== Fracture filling ===
While fracture filling as a method to enhance gems has been found in gems over 2,500 years old, the diamond's unique refractive index required a more advanced filler than simple wax and oil treatments. This technology became available roughly 20 years after the time the laser drilling technique was developed. Simply put, "fracture filling" makes tiny natural fractures inside diamonds less visible to the naked eye or even under magnification.

Fractures are very common inside diamonds and are created during the diamond's creation in the Earth's crust. As the rough diamond travels up from the Earth's crust through volcanic pipes it comes under extreme stresses and pressures, and during this travel tiny fractures can form inside the diamond. If these fractures are visible and damaging to the beauty of the diamond, it will have much lower demand and will not be as salable to jewelers and the general public, making them candidates for fracture filling and thus visually improve the appearance of the diamond.

The fracture filling of diamond is often the last step in the process of diamond enhancement, following laser drilling and acid-etching of inclusions, though if the fractures are surface-reaching, no drilling may be required. The process involves the use of specially-formulated fillers with a refractive index approximating that of diamond. It was pioneered by Zvi Yehuda of Ramat Gan, Israel, and Yehuda is now used as a brand name applied to diamonds treated in this manner. Koss & Schechter, another Israeli firm, attempted to modify Yehuda's process in the 1990s by using halogen-based glasses, but this was unsuccessful. The details behind the Yehuda process have been kept secret, but the filler used is reported to be lead oxychloride glass, which has a fairly low melting point. The New York-based Dialase also treats diamonds via a Yehuda-based process, which is believed to use lead-bismuth oxychloride glass, but research into creating better, more durable, less traceable fillers is still being done, creating more silicone-based fillers for the fracture filling process.

The filler present in fracture-filled diamonds can usually be detected by a trained gemologist under the microscope: While each diamond gets a treatment that fits its unique shape, state and fracture status, there may be traces of surface-reaching bore holes and fractures associated with drilled diamonds, air bubbles and flow lines within the glass, which are features never seen in untreated diamond.

More dramatic is the so-called "flash effect", which refers to the bright flashes of color seen when a fracture-filled diamond is rotated; the color of these flashes ranges from an electric blue or purple to an orange or yellow, depending on lighting conditions (light field and dark field, respectively). The flashes are best seen with the field of view nearly parallel to the filled fracture's plane (although specific fractures in untreated diamonds may cause similar "flash effect"). In strongly colored diamonds the flash effect may be missed if examination is less than thorough, as the stone's body color will conceal one or more of the flash colors. For example, in brown-tinted "champagne" diamonds, the orange-yellow flashes are concealed, leaving only the blue-purple flashes to be seen.

One last but important feature of fracture-filled diamonds is the color of the filler itself: It is sometimes a yellowish to brownish, and along with being visible in transmitted light, it can affect the overall color of the diamond, making the diamond fall an entire color grade after fracture-filling. For this reason fracture-filling is normally only applied to stones whose size is large enough to justify the treatment, although stones as small as 0.02 carats (4 mg) have been fracture-filled.

The fracture-filling of diamond is a controversial treatment within the industry—and increasingly among the public as well—because some companies do not disclose this process when selling these stones. While fracture filling is a durable process, some fillers are damaged and may even melt at certain temperatures (1,400 °C or 1,670 K), causing the diamond to "sweat" the filler under the heat of a jeweler's torch; thus routine jewelry repair can lead to degradation of clarity caused by the loss of the filler used to fill the cracks, especially if the jeweler is not aware of the treatment.

Positions on certification of enhanced diamonds are polarized. On one hand some gemological laboratories, including that of the influential Gemological Institute of America, refuse to issue certificates for fracture-filled diamonds. Conversely others including European Gemological Laboratories (EGL) and Global Gem Labs (GGL) will certify such diamonds to their achieved clarity level while also stating on the certificate that the diamond is clarity enhanced.

A third type of labs may certify these diamonds to the original clarity level. This rends any treatment benefit moot by disregarding apparent clarity, and instead assigning the diamond a grade reflecting its original, pre-treatment clarity. This has raised quite a commotion, as this puts fracture-filled diamonds outside of the traditional realm of diamond certification, damaging their legitimacy as 'mostly natural' diamonds. This demand for clarity-enhanced diamond grading has caused the creation of new labs, or an update to existing lab procedures, to include remarks regarding any clarity enhancements procedures (drilling, fracture filling) into their regular reports, boosting the validity of this trade.

== Color enhancements ==
Generally there are three major methods to artificially alter the color of a diamond: irradiation with high-energy subatomic particles; the application of thin films or coatings; and the combined application of high pressure and high temperature (HPHT). However, there is recent evidence that fracture filling is not only used to improve clarity, but that it can be used for the sole purpose to change the color into a more desirable color as well.

The first two methods can only modify color, usually to turn an off-color Cape series stone (see Material properties of diamond: Composition and color) into a more desirable fancy-colored stone. Because some irradiation methods produce only a thin "skin" of color, they are applied to diamonds that are already cut and polished. Conversely, HPHT treatment is used to modify and remove color from either rough or cut diamonds—but only certain diamonds are treatable in this manner. Irradiation and HPHT treatments are usually permanent insofar as they will not be reversed under normal conditions of jewelry use, whereas thin films are impermanent.

=== Irradiation ===
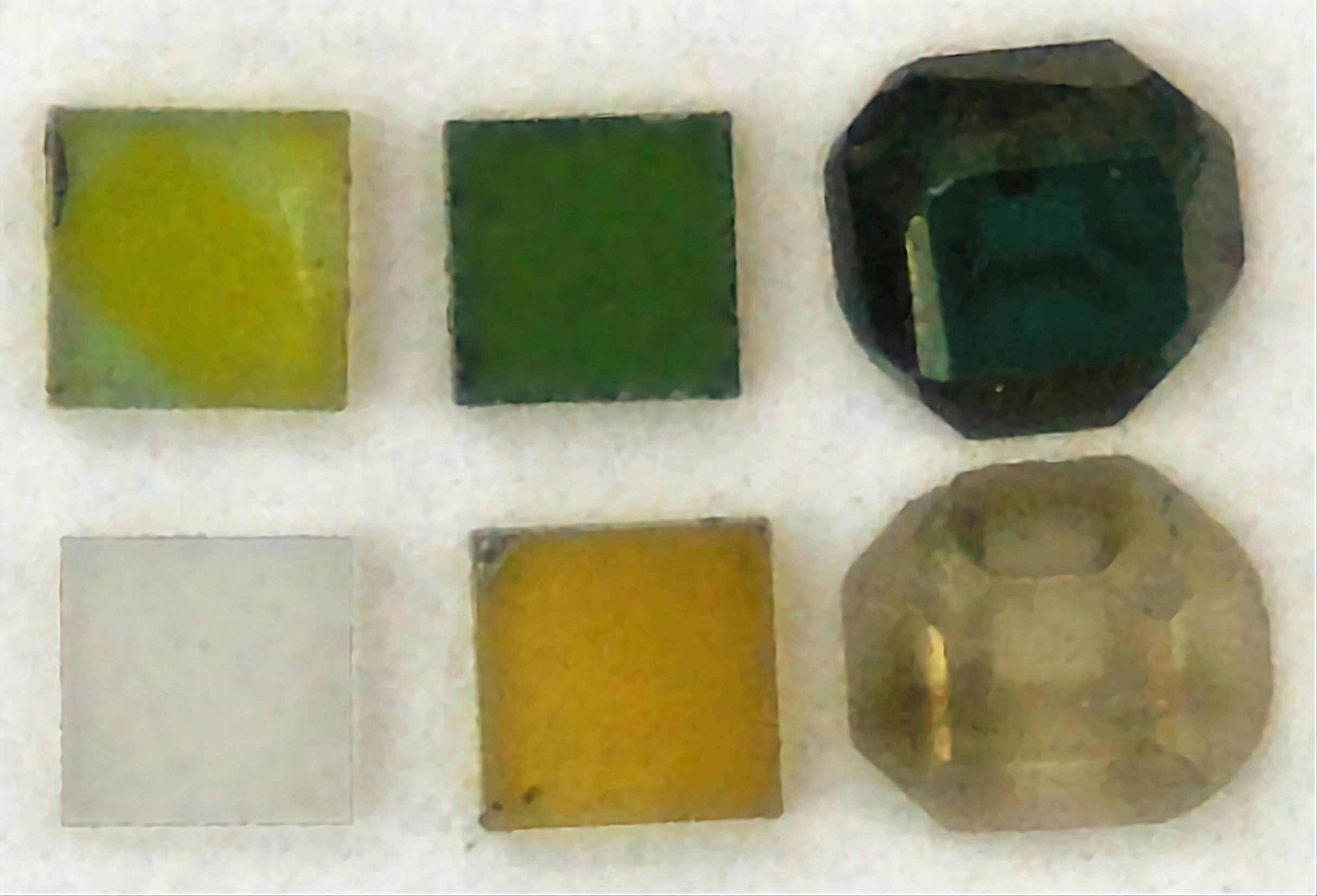
Pure diamonds, before and after irradiation and annealing. Numbered clockwise from left bottom: (1) 2×2 mm initial; top row (2,3,4) irradiated by different doses of 2 MeV electrons; bottom right (5,6) irradiated by different doses and annealed at 800 °C.

Sir William Crookes, a gem fancier as well as a chemist and physicist, was the first to discover radiation's effects on diamond color when in 1904 he conducted a series of experiments using radium salts. Diamonds enveloped in radium salt slowly turned a dark green; this color was found to be localized in blotchy patches, and it did not penetrate past the surface of the stone. The emission of alpha particles by the radium was responsible. Unfortunately radium treatment also left the diamond strongly radioactive, to the point of being unwearable. A diamond octahedron so treated was donated by Crookes to the British Museum in 1914, where it remains today: it has lost neither its color nor radioactivity.

Presently diamonds are safely irradiated in four ways: Proton and deuteron bombardment via cyclotrons; gamma ray bombardment via exposure to cobalt-60; neutron bombardment via the piles of nuclear reactors; and electron bombardment via van de Graaff generators. These high-energy particles physically alter the diamond's crystal lattice, knocking carbon atoms out of place and producing color centers. Irradiated diamonds are all some shade of green, black, or blue after treatment, but most are annealed to further modify their color into bright shades of yellow, orange, brown, or pink. The annealing process increases the mobility of individual carbon atoms, allowing some of the lattice defects created during irradiation to be corrected. The final color is dependent on the diamond's composition, and the temperature and length of annealing.

Cyclotroned diamonds have a green to blue-green color confined to the surface layer: they are later annealed to 800 °C to produce a yellow or orange color. They remain radioactive for only a few hours after treatment, and due to the directional nature of the treatment and the cut of the stones, the color is imparted in discrete zones. If the stone was cyclotroned through the pavilion (back), a characteristic "umbrella" of darker color will be seen through the crown (top) of the stone. If the stone was cyclotroned through the crown, a dark ring is seen around the girdle (rim). Stones treated from the side will have one half colored deeper than the other. Cyclotron treatment is now uncommon.

Gamma ray treatment is also uncommon, because although it is the safest and cheapest irradiation method, successful treatment can take several months. The color produced is a blue to blue-green which penetrates the whole stone. Such diamonds are not annealed. The blue color can sometimes approach that of natural Type IIb diamonds, but the two are distinguished by the latter's semiconductive properties. As with most irradiated diamonds, most gamma ray-treated diamonds were originally tinted yellow; the blue is usually modified by this tint, resulting in a perceptible greenish cast.

The two most common irradiation methods are neutron and electron bombardment. The former treatment produces a green to black color that penetrates the whole stone, while the latter treatment produces a blue, blue-green, or green color that only penetrates about 1 mm deep. Annealing of these stones (from 500 to 900 °C for neutron-bombarded stones and from 500 to 1200 °C for electron-bombarded stones) produces orange, yellow, brown, or pink. Blue to blue-green stones that are not annealed are separated from natural stones in the same manner as gamma ray-treated stones.

Prior to annealing, nearly all irradiated diamonds possess a characteristic absorption spectrum consisting of a fine line in the far red, at 741 nm – this is known as the GR1 line and is usually considered a strong indication of treatment. Subsequent annealing usually destroys this line, but creates several new ones; the most persistent of these is at 595 nm.

Some irradiated diamonds are completely natural. One famous example is the Dresden Green Diamond. In these natural stones the color is imparted by "radiation burns" in the form of small patches, usually only skin deep, as is the case in radium-treated diamonds. Naturally irradiated diamonds also possess the GR1 line. The largest known irradiated diamond is the Deepdene.

=== Coatings ===
The application of colored tinfoil to the pavilion (back) surfaces of gemstones was common practice during the Georgian and Victorian era; this was the first treatment—aside from cutting and polishing—applied to diamond. Foiled diamonds are mounted in closed-back jewelry settings, which may make their detection problematic. Under magnification, areas where the foil has flaked or lifted away are often seen; moisture that has entered between the stone and foil will also cause degradation and uneven color. Because of its antique status, the presence of foiled diamonds in older jewelry will not detract from its value.

In modern times, more sophisticated surface coatings have been developed; these include violet-blue dyes and vacuum-sputtered films resembling the magnesium fluoride coating on camera lenses. These coatings effectively whiten the apparent color of a yellow-tinted diamond, because the two colors are complementary and act to cancel each other out. Usually only applied to the pavilion or girdle region of a diamond, these coatings are among the hardest treatments to detect—while the dyes may be removed in hot water or alcohol with ease, the vacuum-sputtered films require a dip in sulfuric acid to remove. The films can be detected under high magnification by the presence of raised areas where air bubbles are trapped, and by worn areas where the coating has been scratched off. These treatments are considered fraudulent unless disclosed.

Another coating treatment applies a thin film of synthetic diamond to the surface of a diamond simulant. This gives the simulated diamond certain characteristics of real diamond, including higher resistance to wear and scratching, higher thermal conductivity, and lower electrical conductivity. While resistance to wear is a legitimate goal of this technique, some employ it in order to make diamond simulants more difficult to detect through conventional means, which may be fraudulent if they are attempting to represent a simulated diamond as real.

=== High-pressure high-temperature treatment ===
A small number of otherwise gem-quality stones that possess a brown body color can have their color significantly lightened or altogether removed by HPHT treatment, or, depending on the type of diamond, improve existing color to a more desirable saturation. The process was introduced by General Electric in 1999. Diamonds treated to become colorless are all Type IIa and owe their marring color to structural defects that arose during crystal growth, known as plastic deformations, rather than to interstitial nitrogen impurities as is the case in most diamonds with brown color. HPHT treatment is believed to repair these deformations, and thus whiten the stone. (This is probably an incorrect conclusion, the whitening due to destruction of stable vacancy clusters according to one of the researchers). Type Ia diamonds, which have nitrogen impurities present in clusters that do not normally affect body color, can also have their color altered by HPHT. Some synthetic diamonds have also been given HPHT treatment to alter their optical properties and thus make them harder to differentiate from natural diamonds. Pressures of up to 70,000 atmospheres and temperatures of up to 2,000 °C (3,632 °F) are used in HPHT procedure.

Also in 1999, Novatek, a Provo, UT manufacturer of industrial diamonds known for its advancements in diamond synthesis, accidentally discovered that the color of diamonds could be changed by the HPHT process. The company formed NovaDiamond, Inc. to market the process. By applying heat and pressure to natural stones, NovaDiamond could turn brown Type I diamonds light yellow, greenish yellow, or yellowish green; improve Type IIa diamonds by several color grades, even to white; intensify the color of yellow Type I diamonds; and make some bluish gray Type I and Type IIb colorless (although in some cases natural bluish gray diamonds are more valuable left alone, as blue is a highly desired hue). In 2001, however, NovaDiamond quit the HPHT gem business because of what the company's leader, David Hall, characterized as the underhanded practices of dealers. Apparently, dealers were passing off NovaDiamond enhanced gems as naturally colored, and the company refused to be party to this deception.

Definitive identification of HPHT stones is left to well-equipped gemological laboratories, where Fourier-transform infrared spectroscopy (FTIR) and Raman spectroscopy are used to analyze the visible and infrared absorption of suspect diamonds to detect characteristic absorption lines, such as those indicative of exposure to high temperatures. Indicative features seen under the microscope include: internal graining (Type IIa); partially healed feathers; a hazy appearance; black cracks surrounding inclusions; and a beaded or frosted girdle. Diamonds treated to remove their color by General Electric are given laser inscriptions on their girdles: these inscriptions read "GE POL", with "POL" standing for Pegasus Overseas Ltd, a partnered firm. It is possible to polish this inscription away, so its absence cannot be a trusted sign of natural color. Although it is permanent, HPHT treatment should be disclosed to the buyer at the time of sale.

== See also ==
- Brown diamond
- Crystallographic defects in diamond
- Diamond color
- Diamond cut
- Material properties of diamond
