= Aurora Pyramid of Hope =

Collection of 296 cut fancy colored natural diamonds

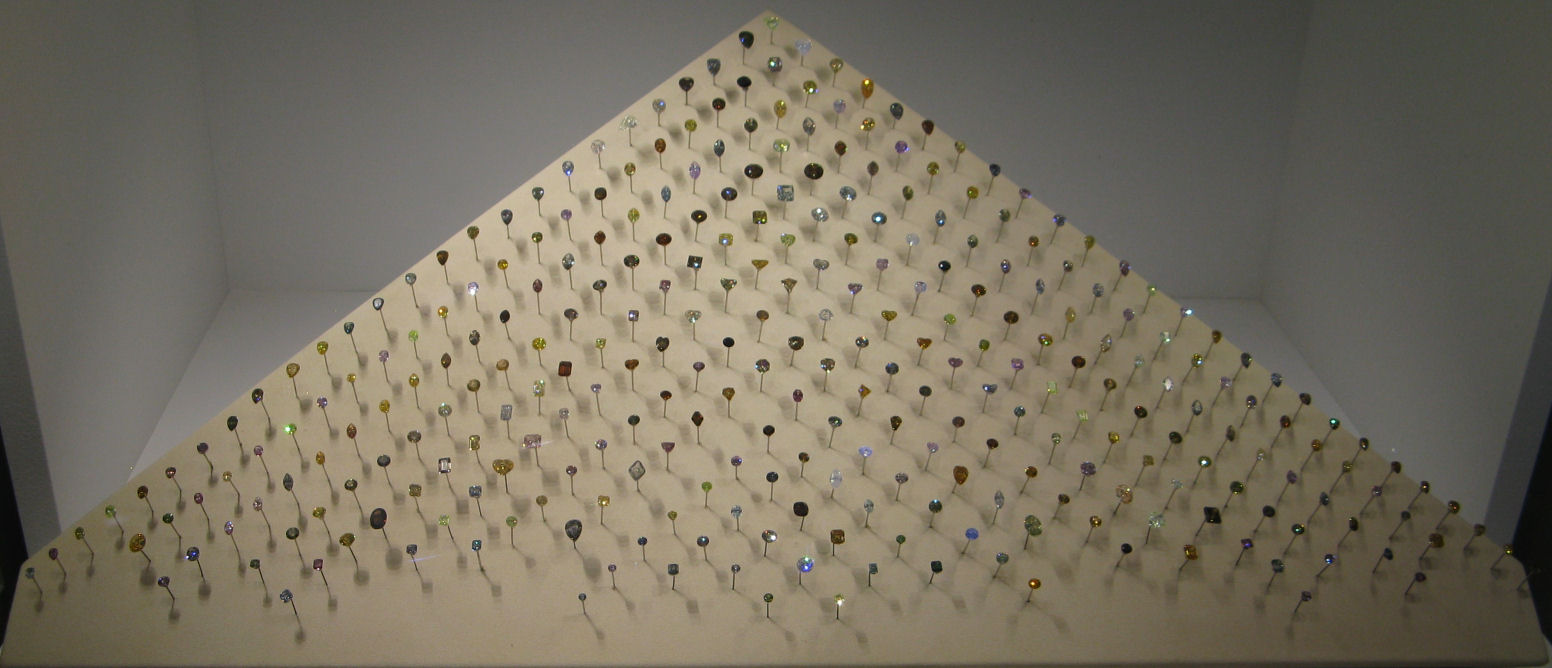
The 296 gems of the Aurora Diamond Collection, displayed in the Natural History Museum in London under visible light

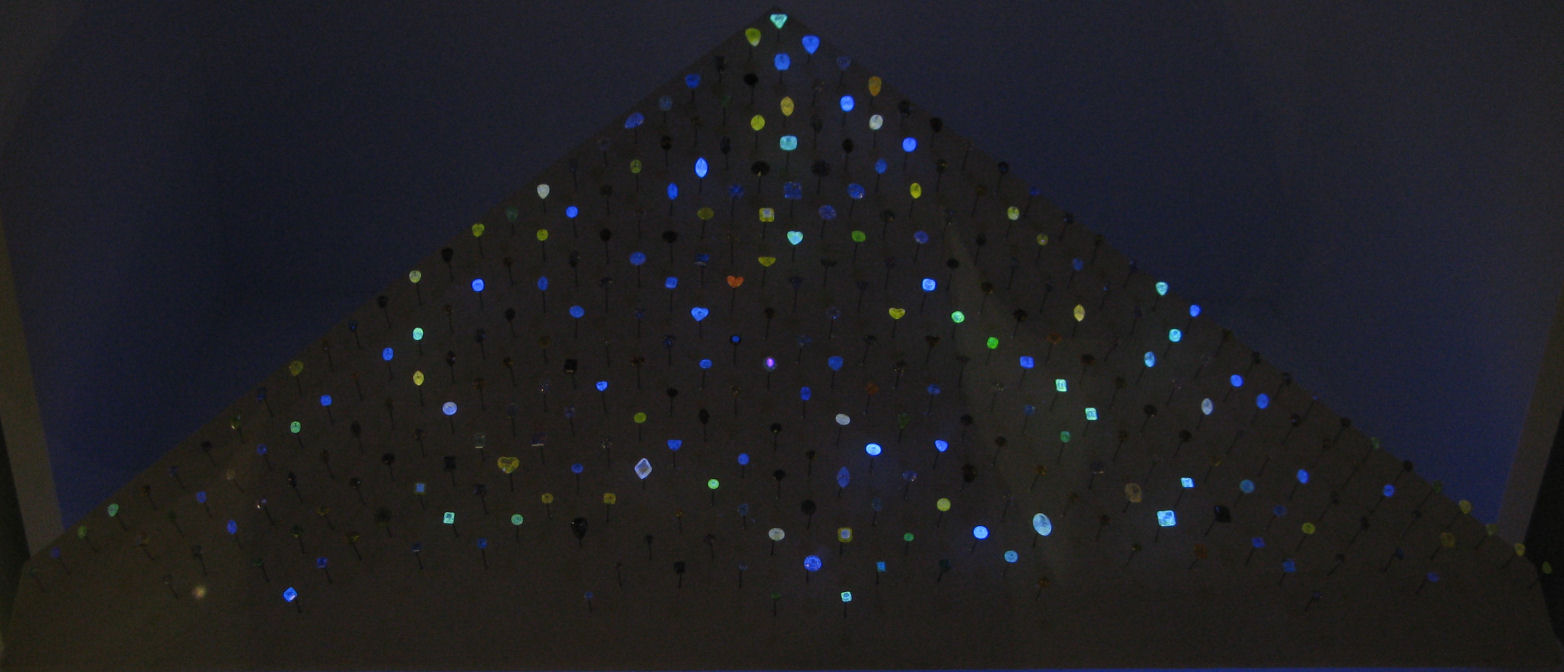
The same collection of gems fluorescing under UV light

The Aurora Pyramid of Hope is a collection of 296 cut natural diamonds in a wide variety of colors, billed as "the most comprehensive natural color diamond collection in the world". It is owned by Aurora Gems, Inc., a diamond merchant specialising in fancy color diamonds. The collection has been displayed on loan in a pyramid-shaped display case in various major museums since 1998. Aurora Gems was founded by Harry Rodman (1909–2008) a gold refiner from the Bronx, and Alan Bronstein, a diamond dealer from New Jersey, who began collecting colored diamonds in 1979.

The original 260-gem collection was on public display at the American Museum of Natural History in New York City from 1989 to 2005 in the Morgan Hall of Gems. It was the centerpiece for the museum's 1998 exhibition The Nature of Diamonds which toured Japan, Canada, and the U.S. In 2005, the collection moved to the Natural History Museum of London. At that time, 36 new specimens were added to the original 260 diamonds, for a total weight of 267.45 carats (53.490 g).

== See also ==
- List of diamonds

== Notes ==
- "How do coloured diamonds form?".
- ""Aurora Pyramid of Hope" – The World's Largest Colourful Diamond Collection". 13 October 2016.
- "The Aurora Pyramid of Hope".
- "Exploring a Spectrum of Diamonds with the Aurora Pyramid of Hope".
- "Minerals bring new sparkle to museum".
