= Brown diamond =

Most common color variety of natural diamonds

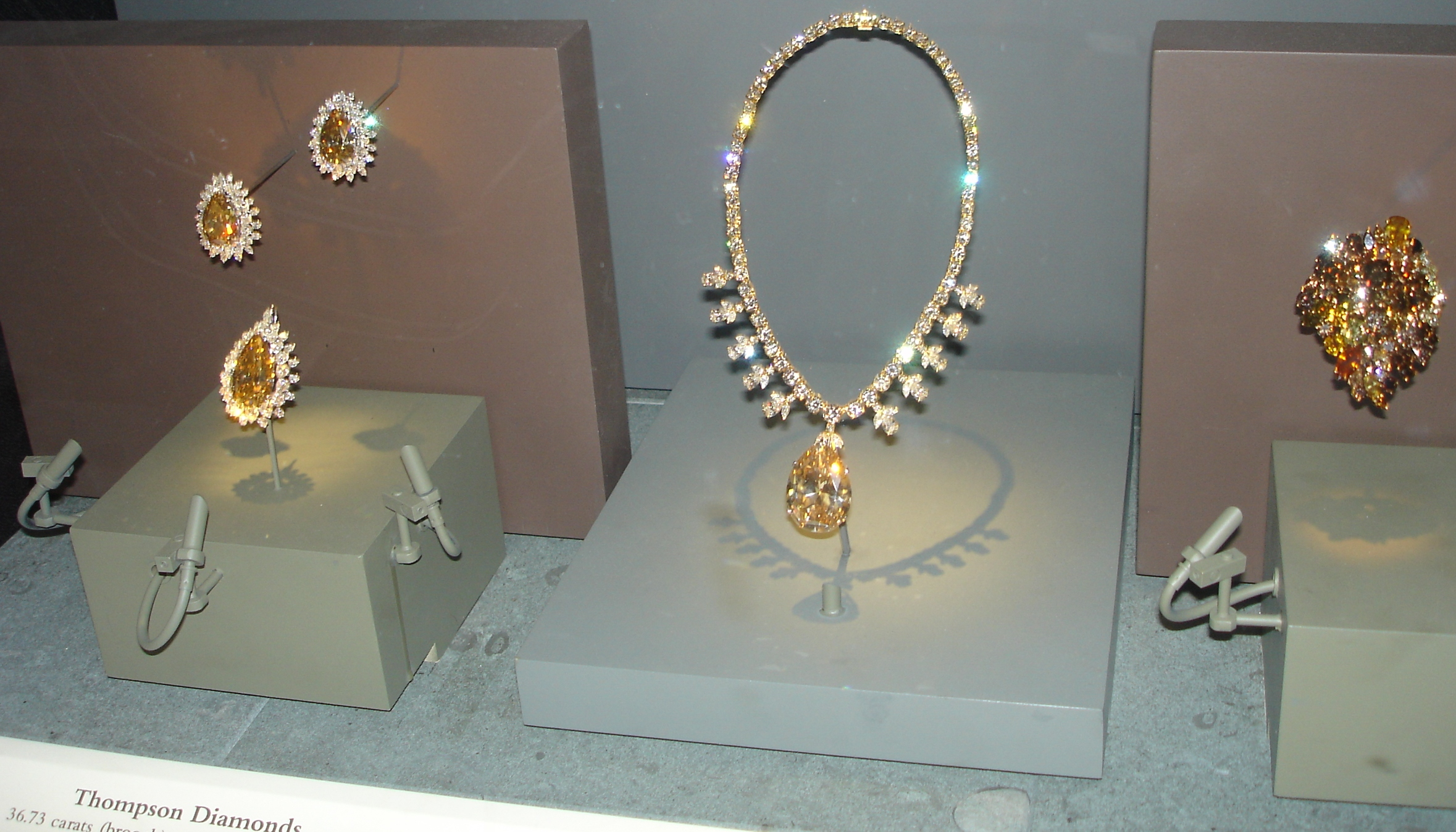
A collection of brown diamonds in the National Museum of Natural History, Washington, D.C. The pear-shaped pendant at the bottom of the necklace weighs 67 carats (13.4 g).

Brown diamonds are the most common color variety of natural diamonds. In most mines, brown diamonds account for 15% of production. The brown color makes them less attractive to some people as gemstones, and most are used for industrial purposes. However, improved marketing programs, especially in Australia and the United States, have resulted in brown diamonds becoming valued as gemstones and even referred to as chocolate diamonds.

A significant portion of the output of Australian diamond mines is brown stones. There are several causes for the brown color, including irradiation treatment, nickel impurities and lattice defects associated with plastic deformation; the last is the predominant cause, especially in pure diamonds. A high-pressure high-temperature treatment can heal lattice defects and convert brown diamonds into yellow or even colorless stones.

== Rise in popularity ==
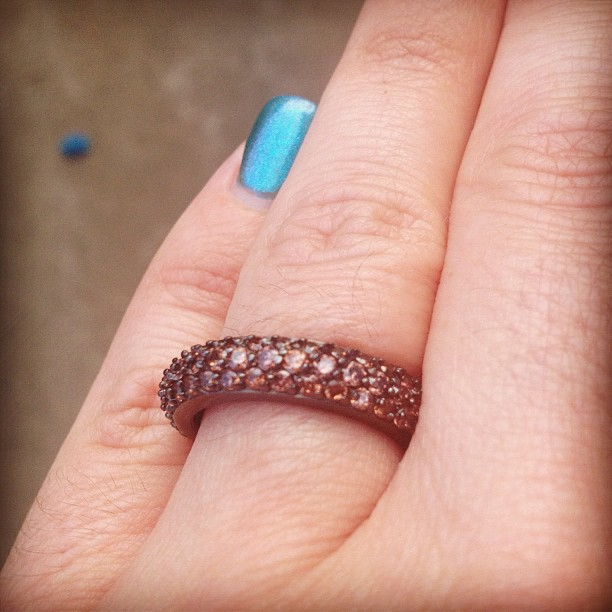
Ring set with 'chocolate diamonds'

In 1986, massive amounts of brown diamonds were brought to the market. Rio Tinto opened the Argyle mine in Australia, in which 80% of the diamonds mined were brown in color. DeBeers followed this trend and in 1996 introduced massive number of brown diamonds to the market. These brown diamonds were previously used only for industrial purposes.

The value of brown diamonds was hard to determine since the GIA and other third party assessors did not evaluate these diamonds. To rectify the issue, Rio Tinto created a grading system where C1 represents the lightest color and C7 the darkest.

In 2000, the fine jewelry company Le Vian trademarked the term "chocolate diamond" and introduced a new brown jewelry line. Le Vian worked with the supplier Rio Tinto and partnered with the retailer, Signet Jewelers. The brand heavily advertised the 'chocolate diamond' line including a massive TV media spend. The campaign was a success; in 2007 virtually no one was searching for "chocolate diamonds", and in 2014 the number jumped to 400,000 times a year.

== Occurrence ==
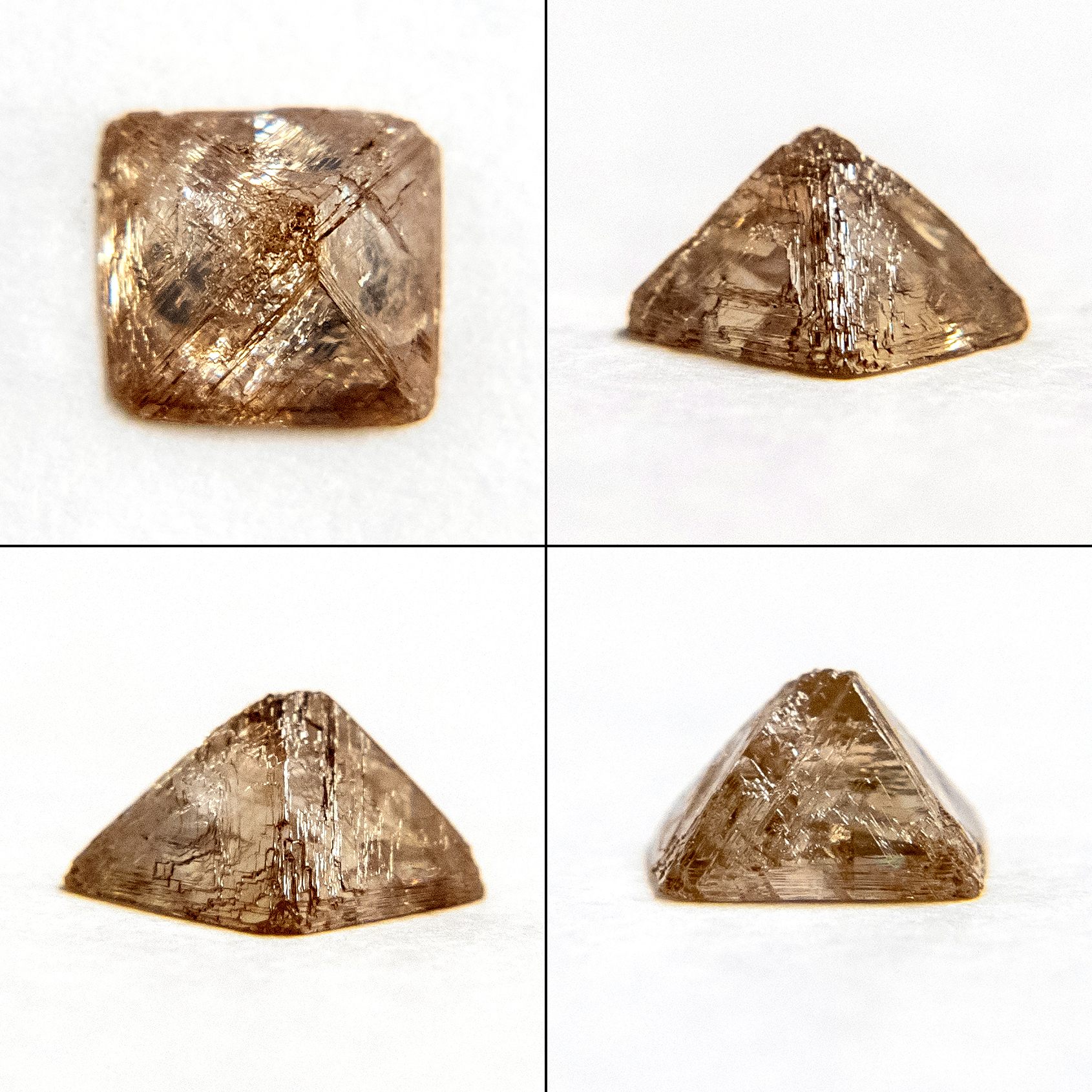
A light brown raw, "coffee-colored", diamond crystal cut in half.

Diamonds occur in various colors, including blue, yellow, green, orange, various shades of pink and red, brown, gray and black. Before the development of the Argyle diamond mine in Australia in 1986, most brown diamonds were considered worthless for jewelry; they were not even assessed on the diamond color scale, and were predominantly used for industrial purposes. However, marketing strategies changed in the 1980s and brown diamonds have become popular gems. The change was mostly due to supply: the Argyle mine, with its 35 million carats (7,000 kg) of diamonds per year, makes about one third of global production of natural diamonds; 80% of Argyle diamonds are brown. The percentage of brown diamonds is lower in other mines, but it is almost always a significant part of the total production. Consequently, scientific research has intensified on causes of brown color in diamond and ways to alter it.

== Notable brown diamonds ==
- The Golden Jubilee Diamond is the largest cut diamond in the world. It was found in 1985 as a rough stone of 755.5 carats (151 g) in the Premier Mine in South Africa, which is operated by De Beers. The stone was cut into a 545.67-carat (109.13 g) and was purchased from De Beers by a group of businessmen led by Henry Ho of Thailand in 1995. The Golden Jubilee Diamond was named by king Bhumibol Adulyadej and given to him on occasion of his 50th coronation anniversary.
- The Earth Star Diamond was found at another South African mine of De Beers, the Jagersfontein Mine on May 16, 1967. The diamond came from the 2,500-foot (760 m) level of the volcanic diamond-bearing pipe. The rough gem weighed 248.9 carats (49.78 g) and was cut into a 111.59 carats (22.318 g) pear-shaped gem with a strong brown color and extraordinary brilliance. The diamond was bought in 1983 for $900,000.
- The Star of the South (the original name was Portuguese "Estrela do Sul") is one of the largest diamonds found in Brazil and the first Brazilian diamond to receive international acclaim. The original rough stone was found in 1853 by an enslaved African woman, for which she received her freedom and life pension. The diamond was cut into a cushion shaped gem weighing 128.48 carats (25.696 g). For a long time, the Star of the South was considered to be "by far the largest diamond discovered by any woman anywhere", until the Incomparable Diamond was discovered in the 1980s. The diamond has a color grade of Fancy Light Pinkish-Brown.
- The Incomparable Diamond is another African diamond, one of the largest ever found in the world (890 carats (178 g)). In 1984, a young girl discovered it in a pile of rubble from old mine dumps of the nearby MIBA Diamond Mine, Democratic Republic of the Congo. The rubble had been discarded during the recovery process because it had been considered too bulky to contain diamonds. Before cutting, the stone was the largest brown diamond and the fourth largest diamond of any color ever discovered after the Cullinan (3,106.75 carats (621.350 g)), Excelsior Diamond (995 carats (199.0 g)) and Star of Sierra Leone (968.9 carats (193.78 g)). The massive diamond's owners initially planned to cut it into the world's largest gem. However, the diamond's final size was reduced to 407.5 carats (81.50 g) in order to reduce the number of internal flaws. Nevertheless, it was the 3rd largest cut diamond after the Cullinan I and Golden Jubilee Diamonds. The stone was cut by a team led by Marvin Samuels, who co-owned the stone along with Donald Zale of Zales Jewellers and Louis Glick. In November 1984 the finished stones were put on display: a single golden diamond of 407.48 carats (81.496 g) in a 'triolette' shape, and fourteen additional gems. Notably, the satellite stones cut from the Incomparable varied greatly in color, from near-colorless to rich yellow-brown. The largest of these stones still bears the name 'Incomparable Diamond', and was graded by the GIA as internally flawless in 1988. In December 2000, jeweler Leland McKee entered into a master agreement to offer The Incomparable Diamond at auction on the eBay website for $26,500,000.00. The auction ended with no sale and is still considered the most expensive loose diamond ever offered and listed on the eBay auction site. The intended sale is referenced on various websites under The Incomparable Diamond.
- The Lesotho Brown was unearthed at the Letseng diamond mine in Lesotho in 1967 at Letseng-la-Terai by Ernestine Ramaboa. The rough stone weighed 601 carats (120.2 g) and was cut in 1968 into 18 polished diamonds totaling 252.40 carats (50.480 g). The largest was a 71.73 carats (14.346 g) emerald cut known as the Lesotho I. The Lesotho III (the third largest stone cut from the crystal) is a 40.42 carats (8.084 g) marquise-shaped gem that was once owned by Jacqueline Kennedy Onassis, given to her by her husband Aristotle Onassis as an engagement ring. It was mounted in a platinum ring created by Harry Winston. The ring had an estimated value of $600,000 US, but at the Jackie Kennedy estate sale auction in April 1996 it reached a price of $2,587,500 US dollars. The Lesotho I was offered at Sotheby's, Geneva on November 19, 2008 as part of a Magnificent Jewels sale, but it did not sell. Its value was estimated before the sale to be 3,360,000 to 5,600,000 Swiss francs, which equated to $2,783,894 to $4,639,824 US dollars. The lot's description mentioned it was being offered for sale by the same owner who had originally bought it from Harry Winston around 1969. It also listed the gem as having a clarity of VVS2, excellent polish and excellent symmetry, and, although the stone (and the other Lesotho fragments) is a pale brown color, no color grade is mentioned in the auction text.
- In 1974, Elizabeth Taylor wore a cognac diamond ring and earrings to the Oscars. The jewelry was a gift from Richard Burton for their tenth anniversary.

== Causes of color ==
=== Irradiation ===
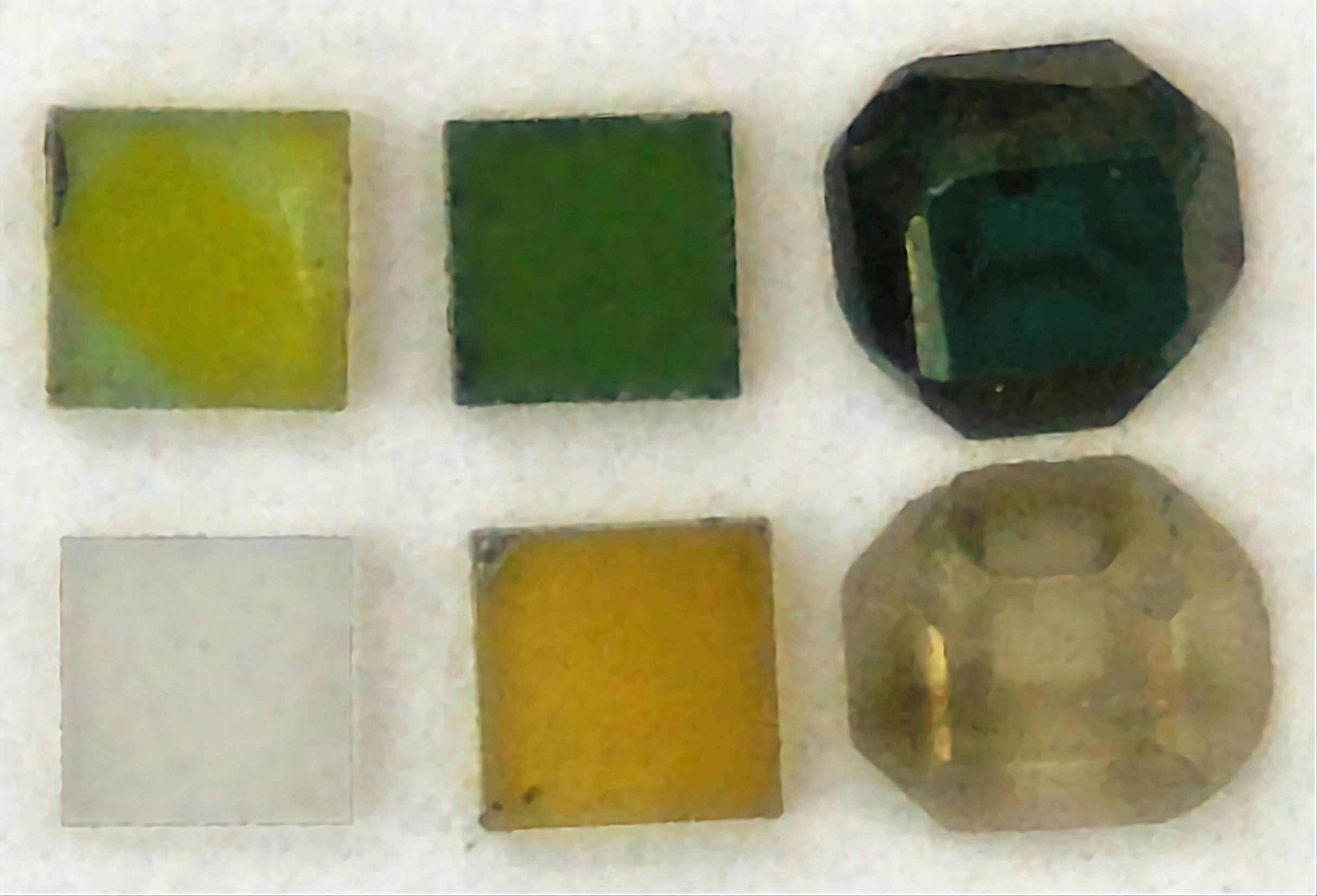
Pure diamonds, before and after irradiation and annealing. Clockwise from left bottom: 1) Initial (2×2 mm) 2–4) Irradiated by different doses of 2-MeV electrons 5–6) Irradiated by different doses and annealed at 800 °C.

Irradiation of diamond by high-energy particles (electrons, ions, neutrons or gamma rays) produces vacancies in the diamond lattice by ejecting carbon atoms. Those vacancies produce green color centers in pure transparent diamond and yellow-green color in yellow diamonds. The color of yellow diamonds results from small numbers of nitrogen atoms replacing carbon in the lattice. Heating the irradiated diamonds to temperatures above 600 °C results in brown color associated with aggregation of the vacancies, with or without nitrogen involved.

Such irradiation and annealing treatment can occur in nature because diamonds are often accompanied by uranium-containing ores which emit alpha particles. However, the thus produced color is restricted to a thin surface layer of few micrometers. Homogeneous color can be produced if the treatment is performed artificially, using electrons, neutrons or gamma-rays. Radiation treatment induces characteristic sharp optical absorption lines which can be easily detected by spectroscopic techniques.

=== Brown synthetic diamonds ===
Synthetic diamonds created by compressing graphite to several gigapascals and heating to temperatures above 1500 °C are usually rich in nitrogen. Nitrogen in those diamonds is dispersed through the lattice as single atoms and induces yellow color. Nickel is often added to graphite to accelerate its conversion into diamond. Incorporation of nickel and nitrogen into diamond induces brown color. Nickel is easily detectable by characteristic, sharp optical absorption and luminescence signals making such diamonds easily identifiable.

=== Natural brown diamonds ===
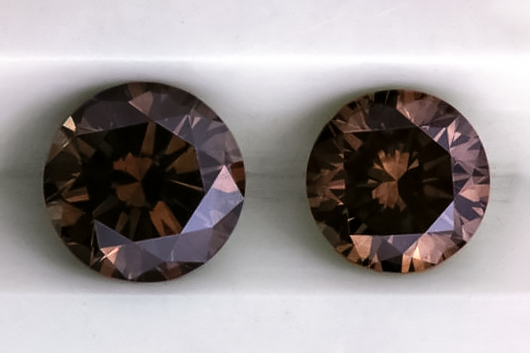
Two small dark chocolate brown brilliant cut diamonds.

Whereas the brown color due to irradiation or nickel impurity can be easily recognized through spectroscopic (e.g. absorption) measurements, the majority of natural brown diamonds do not show any characteristic absorption peaks. Whereas the consensus has been reached that the color relates to the plastic deformation, the particular reason has been reliably identified (large clusters of vacancies) only in type IIa natural brown diamond. Other recent results suggest that these large clusters of vacancies (mini-voids) are a likely cause in other types of diamond as well. Those lattice defects are most likely responsible for the color of the notable diamonds described above.

=== Heat-treated brown diamonds ===
The concept that brown color might be related to lattice imperfections has led to a technique to convert brown diamonds into more valued light-yellow or even colorless ones: the diamond is subjected to high pressures of 6–10 GPa and temperatures above 1600 °C that heals (anneals) those defects. The technique has been demonstrated in several research laboratories in Russia and the United States. In March 1999, Pegasus Overseas Ltd (POL) from Antwerp, Belgium, a subsidiary of Lazare Kaplan International, started marketing such diamonds that were processed by General Electric (GE). Those diamonds therefore received the name GE POL (or GEPOL) and were marketed in the US as Bellataire diamonds. The existence and identity of the treatment process was considered so important that micrometer-sized letters "GEPOL" were inscribed with a laser on the girdles of every treated diamond. In 2004, however, the GE diamond section was purchased by Littlejohn & Co. and renamed Diamond Innovations. Since 1999, several companies around the world have adopted the technique and use various brand names for the processed diamonds.

== See also ==
- List of diamonds
- Blue diamond
- Pink diamond
- Red diamond
