= Pink Star (diamond) =

Notable diamond

Pink Love Pink Star Steinmetz Pink
- Weight: 59.60 carats (11.920 g)
- Color: Fancy Vivid Pink
- Cut: Mixed Oval Brilliant (step cut crown, brilliant cut pavilion)
- Discovered: 1999; unveiled 29 May 2003
- Estimated value: US$71.2 million (2017)

The Pink Star, formerly known as the Steinmetz Pink, is a diamond weighing 59.60 carats (11.92 g), rated in color as Fancy Vivid Pink by the Gemological Institute of America. The Pink Star was mined by De Beers in 1999 in South Africa, and weighed 132.5 carats in the rough. The Pink Star is the largest known diamond having been rated Vivid Pink. As a result of this exceptional rarity, the Beny Steinmetz Group called Steinmetz Diamonds took a cautious 20 months to cut the Pink Star. It was unveiled in Monaco on 29 May 2003 in a public ceremony.

The Pink Star was displayed (as the Steinmetz Pink) as part of the Smithsonian's "The Splendor of Diamonds" exhibit, alongside the De Beers Millennium Star, the world's second largest (the Cullinan I is the largest) top colour (D) internally and externally flawless pear-shaped diamond at 203.04 carat (40.608 g), the Heart of Eternity Diamond, a 27.64 carat (5.582 g) heart-cut blue diamond, and the Moussaieff Red Diamond, the world's largest known Fancy Red diamond at 5.11 carats (1.022 g).

== 2013 and 2017 auctions ==
The Pink Star was auctioned by Sotheby's Geneva on 13 November 2013. The sale price was CHF 68 million (US$74 million, or US$83 million including commission), a world record for any gemstone. The record had been held by the Graff Pink. The Pink Star was bought by New York diamond cutter Isaac Wolf who renamed it The Pink Dream although, according to Forbes magazine, the auction price was not settled by the buyer and the stone was again added to the Sotheby's inventory.

On 4 April 2017, the Pink Star was sold at an auction in Hong Kong for US$71.2 million to Chow Tai Fook Enterprises.

== Names ==
- 1999–2007: The Steinmetz Pink
- 2007–2017: The Pink Star
- 2017–present: CTF Pink Star

== See also ==
- List of diamonds
- Graff Pink (diamond); prior to the November 2013 auction the most expensive diamond of any color to be sold at auction.
