= Diamond color =

Color due to impurities or crystal lattice defects in diamond

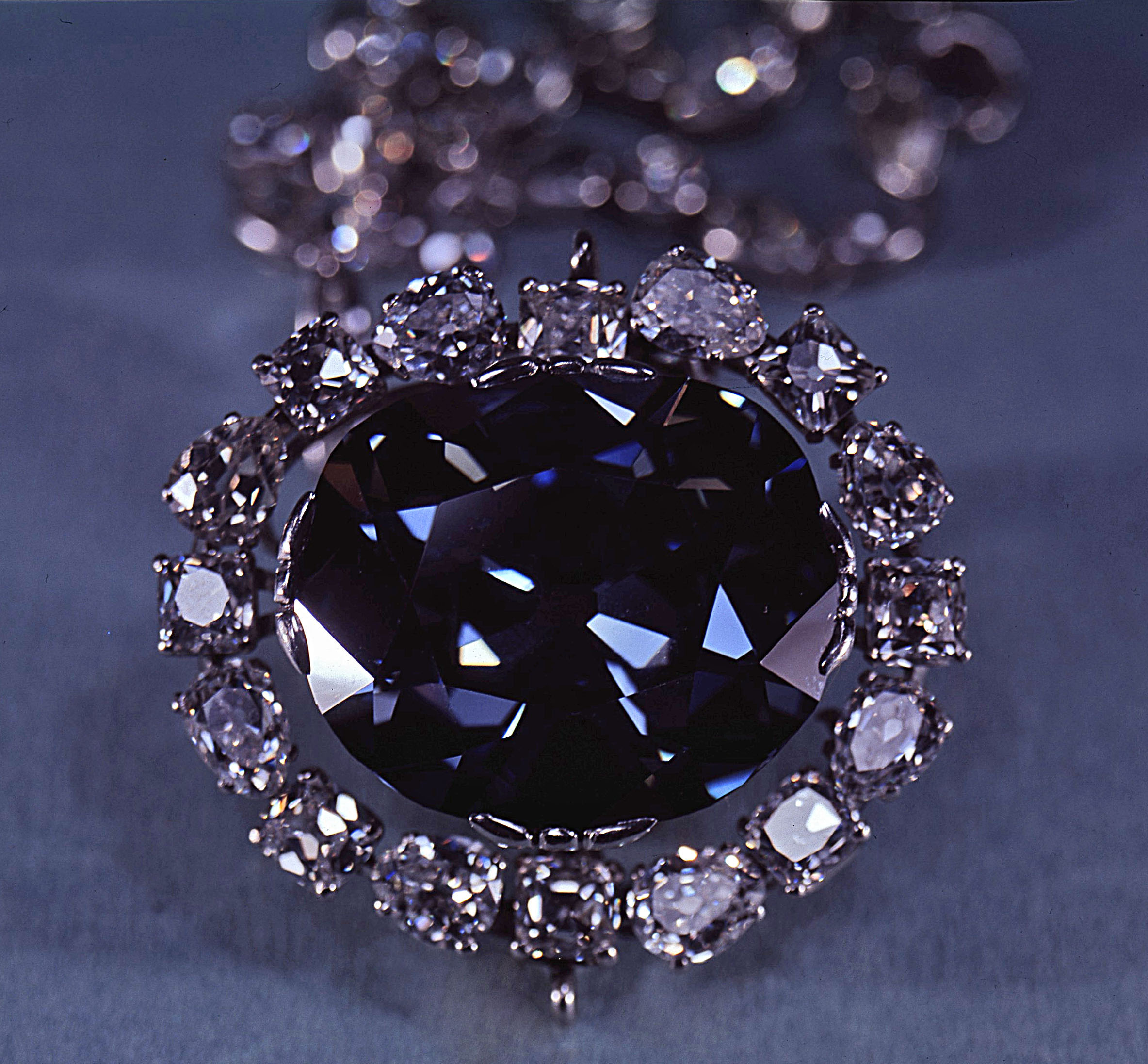
The Hope Diamond, 45.52 carats (9.104 g), dark grayish-blue

A chemically pure and structurally perfect diamond is perfectly transparent with no hue, or color. However, in reality almost no gem-sized natural diamonds are absolutely perfect. The color of a diamond may be affected by chemical impurities and/or structural defects in the crystal lattice. Depending on the hue and intensity of a diamond's coloration, a diamond's color can either detract from or enhance its value. For example, most colorless (white) diamonds are discounted in price when more yellow hue is detectable, while intense pink diamonds or blue diamonds (such as the Hope Diamond) can be dramatically more valuable. Of all colored diamonds, red diamonds are the rarest. The Aurora Pyramid of Hope displays a spectacular array of naturally colored diamonds, including red diamonds.

== History of color grading ==
Color grading of diamonds was performed as a step of sorting rough diamonds for sale by the London Diamond Syndicate.

As the diamond trade developed, early diamond grades were introduced. Without any co-operative development, these early grading systems lacked standard nomenclature and consistency. Some early grading scales were; I, II, III; A, AA, AAA; A, B, C. Numerous terms developed to describe diamonds of particular colors: golconda, river, jagers, cape, blue white, fine white, gem blue, brown, etc.

== Possible colors ==
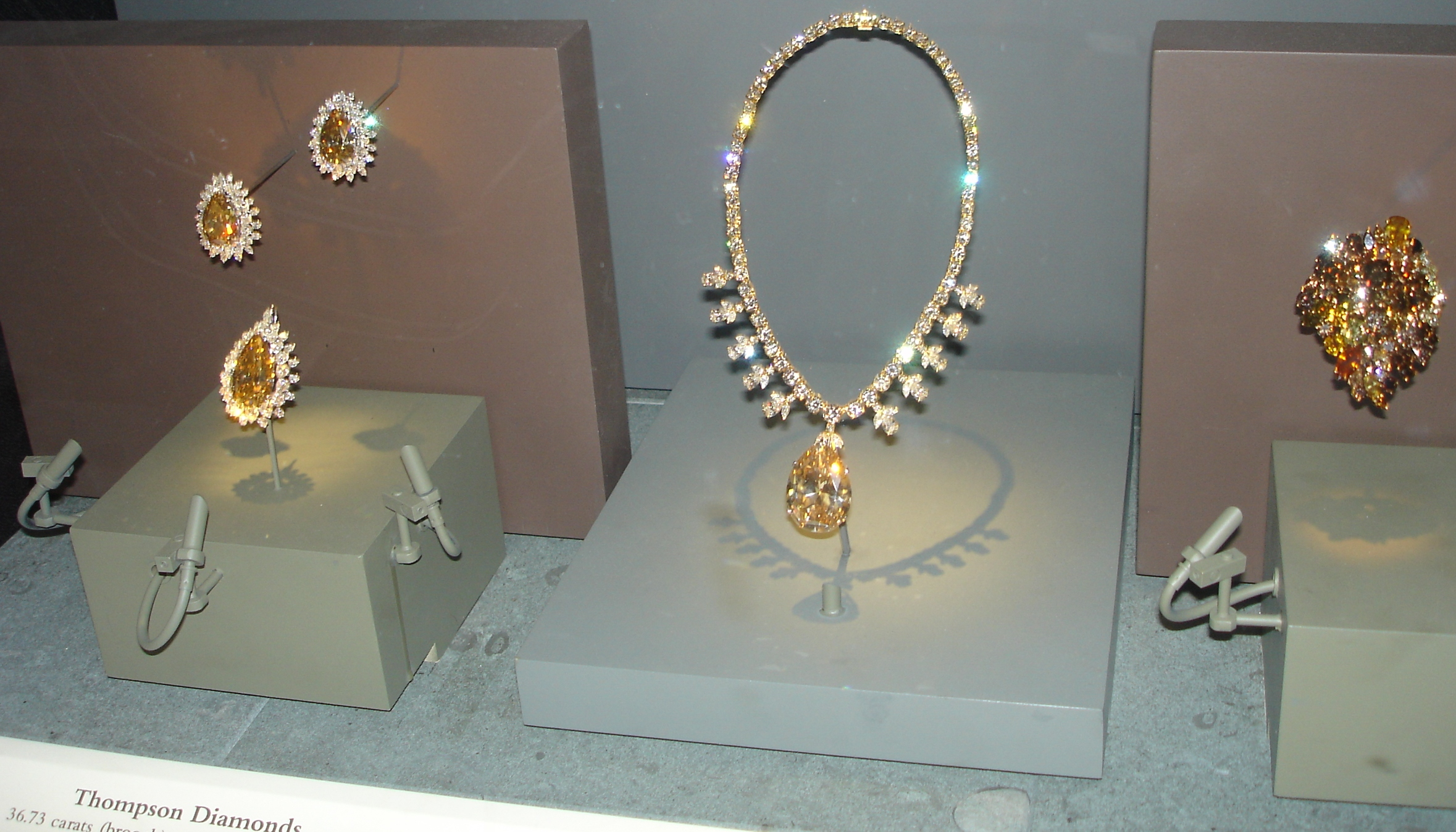
Jewellers diamonds in groups of similar colors. These from the National Museum of Natural History are a medium brown color.

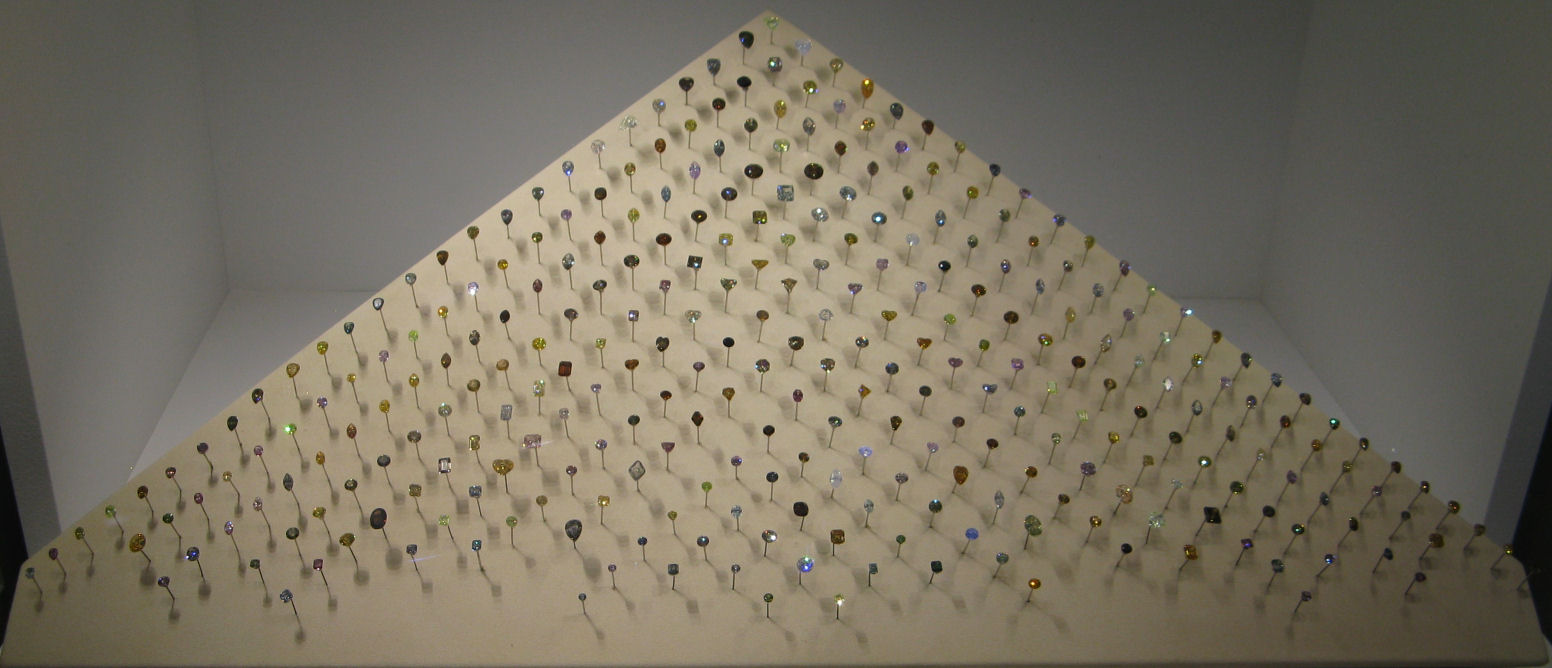
The 296 gems of the Aurora Pyramid of Hope as exhibited in the Natural History Museum in London under natural light.

Diamonds occur in a variety of colors—steel gray, white, blue, yellow, orange, red, green, pink to purple, brown, and black. Colored diamonds contain interstitial impurities or structural defects that cause the coloration; pure diamonds are perfectly transparent and colorless. Diamonds are scientifically classed into two main types and several subtypes, according to the nature of impurities present and how these impurities affect light absorption.

=== Type I ===
Type I diamonds have nitrogen atoms as the main impurity, commonly at a concentration of 0.1%. If the nitrogen atoms are in pairs they do not affect the diamond's color; these are Type IaA. If the nitrogen atoms are in large even-numbered aggregates they impart a yellow to brown tint (Type IaB). About 98% of gem diamonds are type Ia, and most of these are a mixture of IaA and IaB material: these diamonds belong to the Cape series, named after the diamond-rich region formerly known as Cape Province in South Africa, whose deposits are largely Type Ia. If the nitrogen atoms are dispersed throughout the crystal in isolated sites (not paired or grouped), they give the stone an intense yellow or occasionally brown tint (Type Ib); the rare canary diamonds belong to this type, which represents only 10% of known natural diamonds. Synthetic diamond containing nitrogen is Type Ib. Type I diamonds absorb in both the infrared and ultraviolet region, from 320 nm (3.2×10^{−7} m). They also have a characteristic fluorescence and visible absorption spectrum (see Optical properties of diamond).

=== Type II ===
Type II diamond have no measurable nitrogen impurities. Type II diamonds absorb in a different region of the infrared, and transmit in the ultraviolet below 225 nm (2.25×10^{−7} m), unlike Type I diamonds. They also have differing fluorescence characteristics, but no discernible visible absorption spectrum. Type IIa diamond can be colored pink, red, or brown due to structural anomalies arising through plastic deformation during crystal growth—these diamonds are rare (1.8% of gem diamonds), but constitute a large percentage of Australian production. Type IIb diamonds, which account for 0.1% of gem diamonds, are usually light blue due to scattered boron within the crystal matrix; these diamonds are also semiconductors, unlike other diamond types (see Electrical properties of diamond). However, a blue-grey color may also occur in Type Ia diamonds and be unrelated to boron. Also not restricted to type are green diamonds, whose color is caused by GR1 color centers in the crystal lattice produced by exposure to varying quantities of radiation.

Pink and red are caused by plastic deformation of the crystal lattice from temperature and pressure. Black diamonds are caused by microscopic black or gray inclusions of other materials such as graphite or sulfides and/or microscopic fractures. Opaque or opalescent white diamonds are also caused by microscopic inclusions. Purple diamonds are caused by a combination of crystal lattice distortion and high hydrogen content.

== Colorless diamonds ==
The majority of mined diamonds fall between white and pale yellow or brown; what is known as the normal color range. Diamonds of more intense color (usually yellow, but in some cases red, green or blue) are termed fancy color diamonds. Black diamonds are also fancy color diamonds. All other factors being equal, the most valuable diamonds are those with the least color (appearing white to the eye), and those possessing vivid color (especially yellow, pink, and blue). Diamonds at the low end of the normal color range, which possess a pale yellow or brown hue, are the least desirable for jewelry. Color is one of the four traditional factors by which a diamond is evaluated (the others being carat weight, clarity, and cut).

=== Grading the normal color range ===
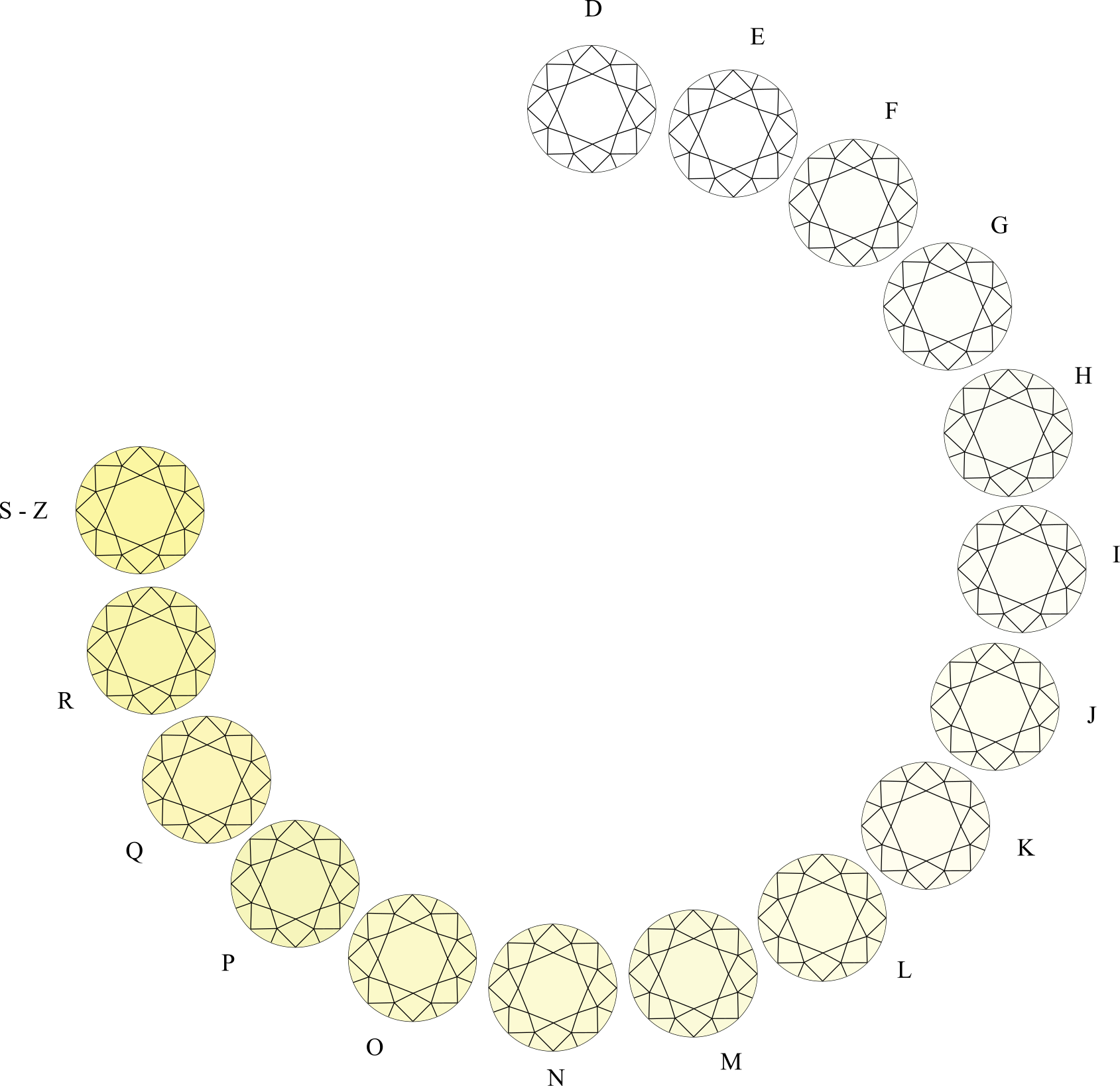
Diamond color grading chart

Refers to a grading scale for diamonds in the normal color range used by internationally recognized laboratories (GIA, IGI, & GCAL by Sarine for example). The scale ranges from D which is totally colorless to Z which is a pale yellow or brown color. Brown diamonds darker than K color are usually described using their letter grade, and a descriptive phrase, for example M Faint Brown. Diamonds with more depth of color than Z color fall into the fancy color diamond range. Grading begins with the letter D, (omitting A, B, C) to ensure that there is no confusion with any of the previous terminology that was used prior to the standardization of the color grading scale. While several grading laboratories use the D–Z color scale (most notably: GIA, IGI, & GCAL by Sarine), there is no universal standard for how the grades are applied.

Diamond color is graded by comparing a sample stone to a master stone set of diamonds. Each master stone is known to exhibit the very least amount of body color that a diamond in that color grade may exhibit. A trained diamond grader compares a diamond of unknown grade against the series of master stones, assessing where in the range of color the diamond resides. This process occurs in a lighting box, fitted with daylight equivalent lamps. Accurate color grading can only be performed with diamond unset, as the comparison with master stones is done with diamond placed on its table facet and pavilion side facing upwards ( i.e. "upside down"— resting on the face one normally looks at). When color grading is done in the mounting, the grade is expressed as an estimated color grade and commonly as a range of color. Grading mounted diamonds involves holding the mounted diamonds table close to the table facet of the master stone and visually comparing the diamond color under the same color conditions as unmounted diamond grading. The resulting grade is typically less accurate, and is therefore expressed as a range of color. While a grading laboratory will possess a complete set of master stones representing every color grade, the independent grader working in a retail environment works with a smaller subset of master stones that covers only the typical grade range of color they expect to encounter while grading. A common subset of master stones would consist of five diamonds in two grade increments, such as an E, G, I, K, and M. The intermediate grades are assessed by the graders judgement.

Diamonds in the normal color range are graded loose (for example F–G).

Diamond color grading scales
GIA	Status: current	AGS	Status: current	AGS	Status: historical: pre 1995	CIBJO	Status: current	IDC	Status: current	Scan. D.N.	Status: current	Old World Terms	Status: historical
grade and description		grade and electronic colorimeter scale		grade and electronic colorimeter scale		grade		grade and description		grade for .50ct and over	grade for under .50ct	series 1 scale	series 2 scale
D	Colorless	0	0–0.49	0	0–0.75	Exceptional white +		Exceptional white +	Colorless	River	White	Finest White	Jager
E	Colorless	0.5	0.5–0.99	0	0–0.75	Exceptional white		Exceptional white	Colorless	River	White	Finest White	River
E	Colorless	0.5	0.5–0.99	1	0.76–1.35	Exceptional white		Exceptional white	Colorless	River	White	Finest White	River
F	Colorless	1.0	1.0–1.49	1	0.76–1.35	Rare white +		Rare white +	Colorless when viewed through the crown	Top Wesselton	White	Fine White	River
F	Colorless	1.0	1.0–1.49	2	1.36–2.00	Rare white +		Rare white +	Colorless when viewed through the crown	Top Wesselton	White	Fine White	River
G	Near Colorless	1.5	1.5–1.99	2	1.36–2.00	Rare white		Rare white	Colorless when viewed through the crown	Top Wesselton	White	Fine White	Top Wesselton
H	Near Colorless	2.0	2.0–2.49	3	2.01–2.50	White		White	Colorless when viewed through the crown	Wesselton	White	White	Wesselton
I	Near Colorless	2.5	2.5–2.99	4	2.51–3.0	Slightly tinted white		Slightly tinted white	Slightly colored	Top Crystal	Slightly tinted white	Commercial White	Top Crystal
J	Near Colorless	3.0	3.0–3.49	5	3.01–3.75	Slightly tinted white		Slightly tinted white	Slightly colored	Crystal	Slightly tinted white	Top silver cape	Crystal
K	Faint Yellow	3.5	3.5–3.99	5	3.01–3.75	Tinted white		Tinted white	Slightly colored	Top cape	Tinted white	Top silver cape	Top cape
K	Faint Yellow	3.5	3.5–3.99	6	3.76–4.5	Tinted white		Tinted white	Slightly colored	Top cape	Tinted white	Silver cape	Top cape
L	Faint Yellow	4.0	4.0–4.49	6	3.76–4.5	Tinted white		Tinted white	Slightly colored	Top cape	Tinted white	Silver cape	Top cape
M	Faint Yellow	4.5	4.5–4.99	7	4.51–5.50	Tinted color 1		Tinted color	Slightly colored to colored	Cape	Tinted color	Light cape	Cape
N	Very Light Yellow	5.0	5.0–5.49	7	4.51–5.50	Tinted color 2		Tinted color	Slightly colored to colored	Cape	Tinted color	Light cape	Low Cape
O	Very Light Yellow	5.5	5.5–5.99	8	5.51–7.0	Tinted color 2		Tinted color	Slightly colored to colored	Light yellow	Tinted color	Cape	Very light yellow
P	Very Light Yellow	6.0	6.0–6.49	8	5.51–7.0	Tinted color 2		Tinted color	Slightly colored to colored	Light yellow	Tinted color	Cape	Light yellow
Q	Very Light Yellow	6.5	6.5–6.99	8	5.51–7.0	Tinted color 2		Tinted color	Slightly colored to colored	Light yellow	Tinted color	Cape	Light yellow
R	Very Light Yellow	7.0	7.0–7.49	9	7.01–8.5	Tinted color 2		Tinted color	Slightly colored to colored	Light yellow	Tinted color	Cape	Light yellow
R	Very Light Yellow	7.0	7.0–7.49	9	7.01–8.5	Tinted color 2		Tinted color	Slightly colored to colored	Light yellow	Tinted color	Dark cape	Light yellow
S	Light Yellow	7.5	7.5–7.99	9	7.01–8.5	Tinted color 3		Tinted color	Slightly colored to colored	Yellow	Tinted color	Dark cape	Light yellow
T	Light Yellow	8.0	8.0–8.49	9	7.01–8.5	Tinted color 3		Tinted color	Slightly colored to colored	Yellow	Tinted color	Dark cape	Light yellow
U	Light Yellow	8.5	8.5–8.99	10	8.51–10	Tinted color 3		Tinted color	Slightly colored to colored	Yellow	Tinted color	Dark cape	Light yellow
V	Light Yellow	9.0	9.0–9.49	10	8.51–10	Tinted color 3		Tinted color	Slightly colored to colored	Yellow	Tinted color	Dark cape	Light yellow
W	Light Yellow	9.5	9.5–9.99	10	8.51–10	Tinted color 3		Tinted color	Slightly colored to colored	Yellow	Tinted color	Dark cape	Light yellow
X	Light Yellow	10	10+	10+		Tinted color 3		Tinted color	Slightly colored to colored	Yellow	Tinted color	Dark cape	Light yellow
Y	Light Yellow	10	10+	10+		Tinted color 3		Tinted color	Slightly colored to colored	Yellow	Tinted color	Dark cape	Light yellow
Z	Light Yellow	10	10+	10+		Tinted color 3		Tinted color	Slightly colored to colored	Yellow	Tinted color	Dark cape	Light yellow

== Colored diamonds ==
=== Fancy colored diamonds ===
Under the GIA system, yellow or brown color diamonds having color more intense than "Z", as well as diamonds exhibiting color other than yellow or brown are considered fancy colored diamonds. These diamonds are graded using separate systems which indicate the characteristics of the color, and not just its presence. These color grading systems are more similar to those used for other colored gemstones, such as ruby, sapphire, or emerald, than they are to the system used for white diamonds.

=== Colored diamond grading system ===
Diamond colors more saturated than this scale are known as "fancy color" diamonds. Any light shade of diamond other than Light Yellow or Light Brown automatically falls out of the scale. For instance, a pale blue diamond won't get a "K", "N", or "S" color grade, it will get a Faint Blue, Very Light Blue or Light Blue grade.

Laboratories use a list of 27 color hues that span the full spectrum for colored gems and diamonds (Red, Orangish-Red, Reddish-Orange, Orange, Yellowish-Orange, Yellow-Orange, Orange-Yellow, Orangish-Yellow, Yellow, Greenish-Yellow, Green-Yellow, Yellow-Green, Yellowish-Green, Green, Bluish-Green, Blue-Green, Green-Blue, Greenish-Blue, Blue, Violetish-Blue, Bluish-Violet, Violet, Purple, Reddish-Purple, Red-Purple, Purple-Red, Purplish-Red). A modifying color combination can also be added (e.g., Olive or Brown-Olive) for stones without the purest hues. Additionally, for diamonds the following colors are used: White (which are milky), Black (which are opaque), Gray, Pink, Brown.

The saturation of these hues is then described with one of nine descriptors: Faint, Very Light, Light, Fancy Light, Fancy, Fancy Dark, Fancy Intense, Fancy Deep, Fancy Vivid.

The terms "Champagne", "Cognac" and "Coffee" refer to different types of brown diamonds. In the diamond processing/dealing industry, the word "Brown" is considered a killer as far as diamond value goes. Even though champagne is a light yellow color, champagne diamonds are Light Brown. Cognac is usually used to describe a diamond that is Orangish-Brown because cognac is a deep golden-orange color. Coffee is usually used to describe a diamond that is a Deep Brown or Vivid Brown color. Some grading agencies may also describe brown stones as Fancy Yellowish-Brown, Fancy Light Brown, Fancy Intense Brown, etc.

=== Value of colored diamonds ===
Diamonds that enter the Gemological Institute of America's scale are valued according to their clarity and color. For example, a "D" or "E" rated diamond (both grades are considered colorless) is much more valuable than an "R" or "Y" rated diamond (light yellow or brown). This is due to two effects: high-color diamonds are rarer, limiting supply; and the bright white appearance of high-color diamonds is more desired by consumers, increasing demand. Poor color is usually not enough to eliminate the use of diamond as a gemstone: if other gemological characteristics of a stone are good, a low-color diamond can remain more valuable as a gem diamond than an industrial-use diamond, and can see use in diamond jewelry. Furthermore, it is much more cost effective to purchase a near-colorless grade diamond (e.g. "G" rated) instead of a colorless grade diamond (e.g. "D" rated), as they are nearly indistinguishable to the naked untrained eye, especially when mounted on a ring setting.

Fancy diamonds are valued using different criteria than those used for regular diamonds. When the color is rare, the more intensely colored a diamond is, the more valuable it becomes. Another factor that affects the value of fancy-colored diamonds is fashion trends. For example, pink diamonds fetched higher prices after Jennifer Lopez received a pink diamond engagement ring.

Investment factors for fancy colored diamonds include rarity (e.g., reds with fewer than 30 known examples), color intensity (vivid blues, pinks, greens, and reds often outperforming yellows and browns), historical provenance (such as ownership or mine origin), size, and condition.

Fancy-colored diamonds such as the deep-blue Hope Diamond are among the most valuable and sought-after diamonds in the world. In 2009, a 7-carat (1.4 g) blue diamond fetched the then highest price per carat ever paid for a diamond when it was sold at auction for 10.5 million Swiss francs (US$9.5 million at the time) which is in excess of US$1.3 million per carat. This record was broken in 2013 when an orange diamond sold for US$35 million or US$2.4 million per carat. It was again broken in 2016 when the Oppenheimer Blue, a 14.62-carat (2.924 g) vivid blue diamond became the most expensive jewel ever sold at an auction. It is the largest fancy vivid blue diamond classified by the Gemological Institute of America ever sold at auction; it sold at Christie's in Geneva in May 2016 for US$50.6 million. The record was broken again by the Pink Star diamond on April 3, 2017. The Pink Star was sold at an auction in Hong Kong for US$71.2 m (553 million Hong Kong dollars including fees) to Chow Tai Fook Enterprises.(GBP 34.7m; 56.83m SFr).

== See also ==
- Diamond
- Diamond clarity
- Diamond cut
- Diamond enhancement
- Gemology
- List of diamonds
- Synthetic diamond
