= Dalmas =

Dalmas may refer to:

== People ==
- Charles Dalmas (1863–1938), French architect who mainly worked in Nice
- Dalmas Otieno (1945–2025), Kenyan politician
- John Dalmas (1926–2017), science fiction author
- Marcel Dalmas (1892–1950), French architect who mainly worked in Nice
- Raymond Comte de Dalmas (1862–1930), French ornithologist and arachnologist
- Susana Dalmás (1948–2012), Uruguayan politician
- Yannick Dalmas (born 1961), French racing driver
- Dalmas I of Semur (c. 985 – 1048), French nobleman from Burgundy
- Dalmas (Dalmace), (c. 1086–1097), a bishop of the Ancient Diocese of Narbonne

== Places ==
- Dalmas, India, a village in Sikar district, Rajasthan
- Saint-Dalmas-le-Selvage, a commune in the Alpes-Maritimes department in south-eastern France

== Other uses ==
- Dalmas (film), a 1973 Australian film
