= Pink Panthers (organized crime group) =

International jewel thief network

- Founded by: Dragan Mikić
- Founding location: Belgrade, Serbia
- Years active: 2001–present
- Ethnicity: Majority Serbians and Montenegrins
- Criminal activities: Robbery, art theft, burglary, possession of stolen property
- Allies: Serbian mafia; Zemun Clan; Russian mafia; Romanian mafia

The Pink Panthers are an international jewel thief network responsible for a number of robberies and thefts described as some of the most audacious in the history of organized crime. The organization has roughly 800 core members, many of whom are ex-soldiers with extensive military and paramilitary backgrounds. Both women and men play an equal part in the structure of the organization. The organization's membership mostly consists of Serbian and Montenegrin citizens, who are believed to be Bosnian War veterans making use of their military experience for criminal activity. The organization was named by Interpol after The Pink Panther series of crime comedy films.

The Pink Panthers are responsible for what have been termed some of the most "glamorous" heists in history, with one criminologist even describing their crimes as "artistry". They have operated in numerous countries and on several continents, and include Japan's most successful robbery amongst their thefts. A film documentary based upon their thefts, Smash & Grab, was released on 2 July 2013.

== Raids ==
In 2003, the gang first came to attention and earned the nickname "Pink Panthers" following the theft of a £500,000 diamond from a jewellers in the Mayfair area of London. The thieves hid the diamond in a jar of face cream, mimicking an act seen in the film The Return of the Pink Panther. In May 2005, Graff, a diamond specialist in London, was targeted by Pink Panthers and lost a total of £1 million in jewellery. Three men were suspected of being behind the theft; one was in possession of a firearm. Graff had been targeted in 2002 and lost £23 million on that occasion, £3 million of which was recovered two years later. One of the thieves was sentenced to 15 years in prison in July 2004.

In the space of six years during the 21st century, the Pink Panthers robbed 120 stores in 20 countries. Japan, United Kingdom, Denmark, Monaco, France, Switzerland, the United Arab Emirates and the United States have all been targeted by the gang, with the attention to detail of the heists ensuring a high rate of success. Before robbing a jewellery store in Biarritz, the gang covered a nearby bench in fresh paint to deter anyone from sitting on it and seeing them in action.

The gang is suspected of participating in at least two smash-and-grab jewellery robberies in Tokyo's Ginza district. The first, in 2004, netted ¥3.5 million (US$32,000) in gems. The second, in June 2007, took jewellery valued at ¥284 million (US$2.4 million); during the heist, Rifat Hadžiahmetović and Radovan Jelušić sprayed tear gas at three saleswomen before taking a tiara, necklaces, and other jewels and fleeing the store.

The gang is also known for its escapes and its attempts to break into their chosen store. The gang robbed a jewellery store in Saint-Tropez in 2005 wearing T-shirts emblazoned with flowery designs, before making their escape on a speedboat. Prior to one 2008 robbery of Graff jewellers in Dubai, eight gang members drove two Audis through a window, taking watches and other items worth a total of £8 million. In a further robbery in December 2008, four gang members dressed themselves up as women before breaking into Harry Winston jewellers in Paris. The gang escaped with items worth over US$100 million (£60 million).

Speculation also exists as to certain other robberies having been conducted by the gang; in the August 2009 robbery of Graff Diamonds in London a key element in the speculation being that the robbers made no attempt to hide their faces, suggesting that they had already altered their appearances with prosthetic makeup.

In 2013, the gang was suspected to have struck again when a man wearing a baseball cap and a scarf covering his face broke into the Carlton Hotel in Cannes and made off with $136 million worth of jewels and jewellery being stored by the Leviev diamond house for an exhibit. Nice-Matin, a leading newspaper in the region, speculated that this may have been the most costly jewellery theft in history.

== Arrests and breakouts ==
According to Interpol, a number of the gang's members have been identified and linked through DNA matching. In 2005, three Serbs, two men and one woman, were arrested in Belgrade on suspicion of being part of the gang; in October 2007, they were sentenced to jail terms by a court in Serbia for the theft of the Comtesse de Vendome necklace, worth approximately £15 million ($30 million), in March 2004 from a Tokyo jewellery boutique, in what was Japan's biggest ever jewel robbery. The gang leader was sentenced to seven years of imprisonment, while the other two were handed lesser sentences.

Three Pink Panthers from Serbia were declared guilty of robberies carried out in Biarritz, Cannes, Courchevel and Saint-Tropez by one court in Chambéry in 2008. Two were given jail terms of six and 10 years.

One suspect in a June 2007 Ginza heist, an ethnic Bosniak Montenegrin national named Rifat Hadžiahmetović, who had been travelling on a forged Bulgarian passport, was arrested in March 2009 by Cypriot police at Larnaca International Airport. Hadžiahmetović was due to serve a sentence in Cyprus for travelling on a forged passport before being extradited to Spain. He was extradited from Spain to Japan and, in September 2011, was sentenced to 10 years in prison. His accomplice, Radovan Jelušić, was arrested in Italy in 2010 over a separate crime, then was extradited to Montenegro to stand trial on 18 May 2012.

On 20 June 2009, French police in Monte Carlo detained another three members of the gang seen loitering near jewellery shops in Monaco. The gang members drove up outside a casino in Casino Square on 18 June 2009. The men were told to lie down and were then handcuffed before being whisked away from the scene quickly.

One of the three arrested, Serbian Dragan Mikić, was of special interest to the police investigation into the gang, having been placed on Interpol's "Most Wanted" list, suspected to be a senior member of the Pink Panthers. Mikić has been on the run since 2005, after breaking out of jail via a ladder whilst other people fired machine guns at the prison.

A head figure of the Pink Panthers, Mitar Marjanović, was arrested on 8 March 2012 in Rome, after two of his accomplices in a bank robbery, committed a month earlier, dropped stolen items containing Marjanovic's fingerprints.

On 14 March 2012, three more members of the gang were arrested in Athens, Greece. Two of the three were male Serbians, aged 20 and 36, and were arrested while casing a jewellery store. Patrolling police were prompted to question them due to their wearing wigs. The two men fled, the 36 year-old suspect firing at and injuring a police officer during the pursuit that followed. Both were arrested and led police to the arrest of the third person, 43 year-old Serbian female Olivera Vasić Ćirković. On 12 July 2012, Olivera escaped from prison in Athens when a man who entered the prison on the pretext of delivering art supplies knocked out a guard and stole her keys.

On 14 May 2013, a member of the gang escaped from the "Bois-Mermet" prison in Lausanne, Switzerland. As of June 2021, he has not yet been caught. He escaped with the help of three outside accomplices who meticulously prepared the operation. Four other prisoners got away at the same time. On 25 July 2013, Milan Poparić, who was serving a sentence of almost seven years for a 2009 robbery at a jewellery store, was the third Pink Panther to escape from a Swiss prison since May 2013. Also escaping was Swiss kidnapper, arsonist and money launderer Adrian Albrecht. They were helped out of the prison at Orbe, in western Switzerland, by accomplices who broke through the perimeter fence and brought ladders for the escapees while keeping the prison guards at bay with fire from AK-47s.

On 3 June 2015, six were arrested in Zagreb, Croatia, while they were preparing for a heist with munitions and two cars similar to those driven by security forces in Croatia; three of the arrested were Serbs, two Bosnian, and one Montenegrin. Names of the arrested Serbs were Saša Antonić, Aleksandar Tasić and Dejan Kostić.
