= 2013 Carlton Cannes heist =

Armed robbery on the French Riviera

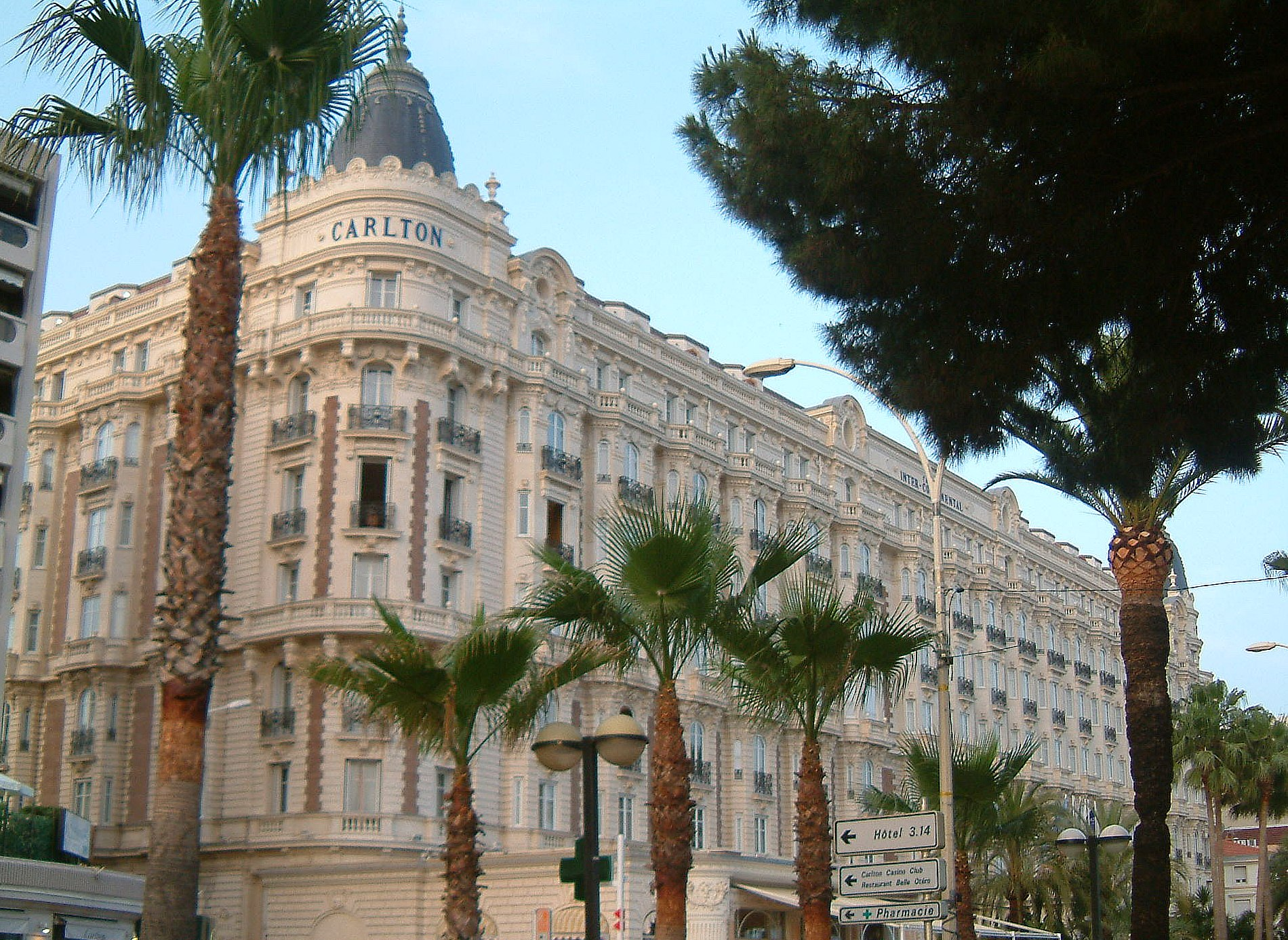
- The hotel where the theft took place
- Date: 28 July 2013
- Outcome: $56 million initial estimate $136 million total
- Suspects: Milan Poparic (member of the Pink Panthers)

The Cannes jewel heist was an armed robbery at the Carlton Intercontinental Hotel in Cannes, a city on the French Riviera. The thief stole gemstones and watches ultimately valued at $136 million (€103 million/£89 million). (Initial estimates had only reached $53 million (€37–38 million/£33-34 million), as they had not taken into account another room in the hotel).

== Theft ==
The valuables were stolen from a private hotel salon, which was very poorly guarded, the guards having no weapons. The jewels were present due to a display by Israeli billionaire Lev Avnerovich Leviev.

The armed thief was described as having a baseball cap and scarf, carrying a handgun. The theft initiated a manhunt but no arrests were made. Milan Poparic, a known member of the Pink Panthers, an organized crime gang, has been suggested as a potential suspect, having escaped prison days before the heist. According to reporting by investigative journalist Ryan Jacobs, most believe the thief was unlikely to be acting on his own.

The thief, carrying a handgun, entered the salon through a french door, which might have been forced or left open, and picked up a sack containing 72 jewels, 34 of which have been described as exceptional, in a suitcase. The heist has been called the biggest heist ever in France, and possibly the biggest heist of all time. The theft was at the same hotel where Alfred Hitchcock's 1955 film To Catch a Thief was set.

The robbery was the third in the Riviera over a short period, following the theft from the Cannes Film Festival of jewels worth $1.4 million, and the theft of a $1.9 million necklace.

=== Reward ===
10 days after the heist, SW Associates, working for the insurers Lloyd's of London, offered a $1.3 million (€1 million) reward to the first person to give information leading to recovery of the stolen items, and released images of some of the stolen jewellery.
