= Charles Dalmas =

French architect

- Born: 11 March 1863; Nice, France
- Died: 18 October 1938 (aged 75); Nice, France
- Occupation: Architect

Charles Dalmas (11 March 1863 – 18 October 1938) was a French architect who mainly worked in Nice, in the south of France.

== Life ==
Charles Dalmas was born in Nice on 11 March 1863, one of six children of a shoemaker and a seamstress. He attended the Nice School of Decorative Arts, where he was recognized as a gifted student. In August 1886 he was admitted as an architecture student at the École nationale supérieure des Beaux-Arts in Paris, the only school in France that issued a diploma of architecture. The city of Nice helped fund his studies in 1888. He won various prizes including the Müller-Soehnée prize of 539 francs for deserving students. In the 1890-91 term he was unable to complete the two projects required of each student due to health problems and a period of military service, and was therefore dismissed from the school. On appeal he was readmitted, and graduated on 23 December 1891 with a project for a city hall for Nice. He continued to study at ENSBA until March 1893.

Charles Dalmas returned permanently to Nice in 1897, and became professor of building technology at the Nice School of Decorative Arts. His architecture practice flourished, and on 25 May 1919 he was named president of the Association of Architects of the South East. His son, Marcel Dalmas (1892–1950), collaborated with Charles Dalmas in the 1920s and 1930s. Charles and Marcel Dalmas received a Grand Prix at the Paris International Decorative and Industrial Arts Exhibition in 1925 for the Alpes Maritimes pavilion. Their design was a "modest dwelling of an Art Lover in the Alpes-Maritimes". Charles and Marcel Dalmas were both lovers of tennis. They built a new facility for the Lawn-Tennis Club de Nice in the 1920s, choosing a regional style and materials. Charles Dalmas was named knight of the Legion of Honour in 1928.

Charles and Marcel Dalmas collaborated with the architect and engineer François Alexandre Arluc in construction of the Miramar Hotel in Cannes in 1928. That year Charles and Marcel Dalmas built the Art Deco Palais de la Méditerranée casino on the Promenade des Anglais, Nice. Most of the casino was demolished in May 1990 apart from two of the facades, replaced by a resort with conference facilities, recreation areas, residences and offices. Marcel-Victor Guilgot was associated with Charles and Marcel Dalmas from 1931 to 1937. Charles Dalmas died at his home in Nice on 18 October 1938 at the age of 75.

== Noted works ==
=== In Cimiez ===
Year	Structure	Location
c. 1900	Rivera Palace	Boulevard de Cimiez
Before 1906	Palais Winter	84 Boulevard de Cimiez
c. 1906	Hôtel Hermitage	Avenue Bieckert
1907	Villa Argentine	Boulevard de Cimiez, corner of Avenue Bieckert
1911	Grand-Palais	2bis boulevard de Cimiez
1912	Carlton-Carabacel	Avenue Bieckert
1923	Lotissement de villas	Boulevard Edouard VII

=== Hotels ===
Year	Structure	Location
1905	Hôtel Royal	Promenade des Anglais, Nice
1906	Hôtel Scribe	Rue Paganini, Nice
1912	Hôtel Ruhl	Promenade des Anglais, Nice
1912	Hôtel Carlton	La Croisette, Cannes
1912	Hôtel Splendid	Boulevard Victor-Hugo, Nice
1913	Palace-Hôtel	Rue A. Karr, Nice
1913	Hôtel Atlantic	12 boulevard Victor Hugo, Nice
1923	Hôtel O'Connor	Avenue Joffre, Nice
1928	Hôtel Miramar	La Croisette, Cannes
1929	Palais de la Méditerranée	Promenade des Anglais, Nice

=== Other buildings ===
Year	Structure	Location
1904	École des Arts Décoratifs	Rue Tonduti de l'Escarène, Nice
1904	Palais Donadei I	Boulevard Victor Hugo, Nice
1905	Palais Marie-Lévy	Corner of Rue Blacas & Rue Pastorelli, Nice
1906	Palais Donadei II	Place De Gaulle, Nice
1907	Four buildings	North side of Boulevard Raimbaldi, Nice
1909	Immeuble Piano	Rue Massingy, Nice
1909	Immeuble Cauvin	Avenue Borriglione, Nice
1911	Manoir Belgrano	Boulevard Edouard VII, Nice
1912	Immeuble de la Tour	Rue Guiglia, Nice
1912	Immeuble Gassin	Rue Joffre, Nice
1912	Immeuble Bermond de Clinchan	Corner of Rue de France & Rue Rivoli, Nice
1912	Palais Trianon	Avenue Depoilly, Nice
1913	Immeuble Fomitcheff	Place Franklin, Nice
1914	Palais Bouteilly	18 rue Berlioz, Nice
1914	Villa de la Société du littoral	41 rue de France, Nice
1922	Immeuble Véran	Boulevard Carabacel, Nice
1923	Immeuble Nahapiet	63 promenade des Anglais, Nice

=== Modifications of Facades ===
Year	Structure	Location
c. 1900	Hôtel Plaza et de France	Avenue de Verdun, Nice
1917	Cercle de la Méditerranée	Promenade des Anglais, Nice
1919	Grand-Hôtel	Avenue Félix Faure, Nice
1920	Société Marseillaise	Boulevard Dubouchage, Nice
1921	Banque Nationale de Paris	Boulevard Victor Hugo, Nice
1921	Banque Commerciale Italienne	Boulevard Risso, Nice

== Sources ==
- Clémence Segalas, Charles Dalmas 1863-1938 (PDF) (in French)
- "HÔTEL MIRAMAR (1929 - 1946)", Palais Miramar.free (in French)
- "Marcel Dalmas", PSS-archi (in French)
- Nice - Immeuble Morabito (in French), Ministre de la Culture et de la Communication
- Nice - Palais de la Méditerranée (in French), Ministre de la Culture et de la Communication
