= Olivera Ćirković =

Serbian basketball player and jewel thief

- Оливера Ћирковић
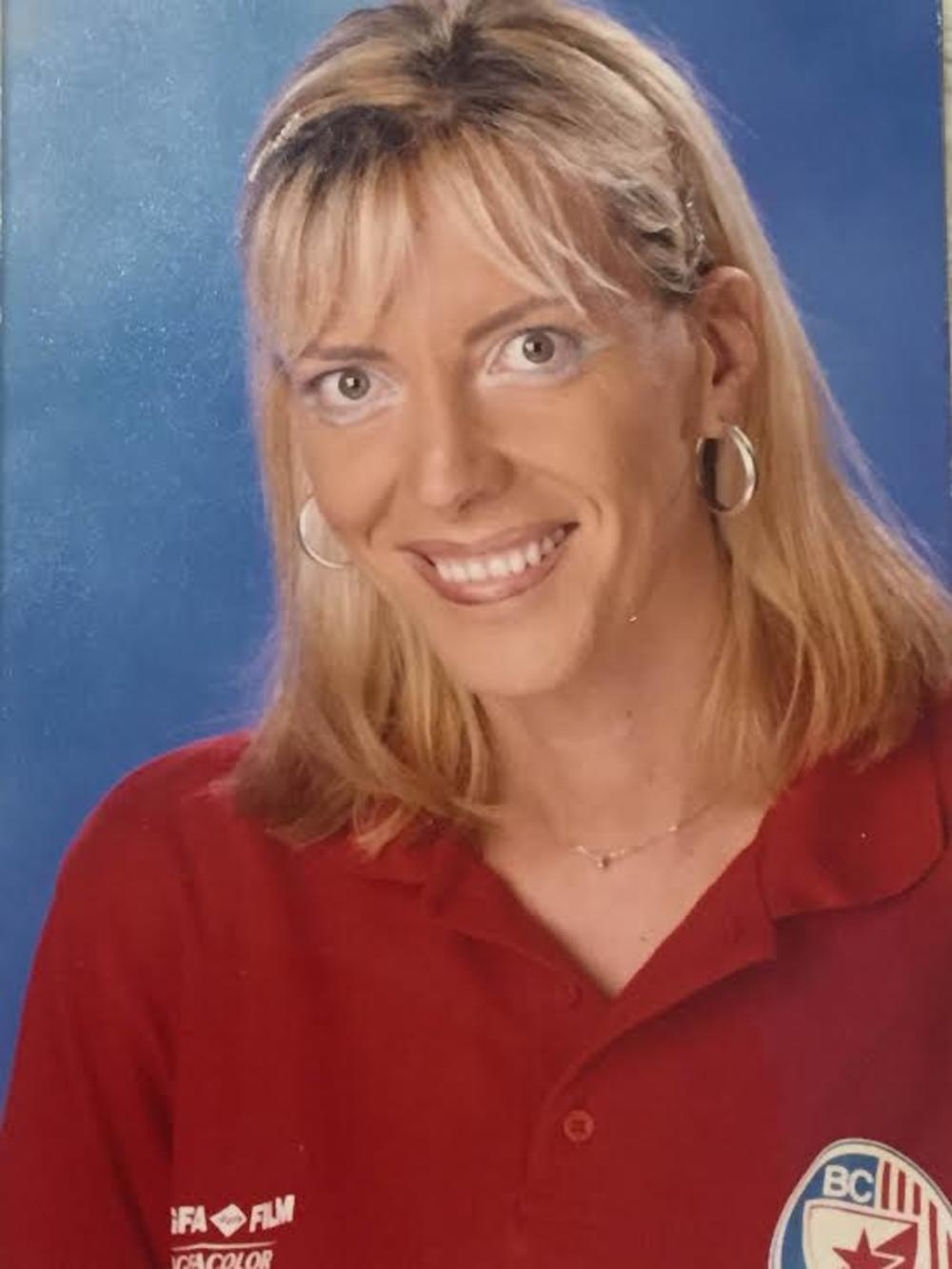
- Born: Olivera Vasić; 3 September 1969 (age 57); Belgrade, SR Serbia, SFR Yugoslavia
- Occupations: basketball player, writer, painter
- Criminal charge: jewellery store robberies
- Criminal penalty: 12 years in Greek prison
- Criminal status: Released after 6 years
- Children: 1
- Basketball career

Personal information
- Listed height: 1.93 m (6 ft 4 in)

Career information
- Playing career: 1986–2000
- Position: Power forward / center

Career history
- Voždovac
- Crvena zvezda
- –1992: Jedinstvo Tuzla
- 1992–1998: Pagrati
- 1998–1999: Celje
- 1999–2000: Crvena zvezda
Medals
Women's basketball
Representing Yugoslavia
European Championship for Juniors
Bronze medal – third place	1988 Bulgaria	U18 Team

Olivera "Olja" Ćirković (Serbian Cyrillic: Оливера Ћирковић; née Vasić Serbian Cyrillic: Васић; born 3 September 1969), is a Serbian writer and painter, former convicted criminal and former professional basketball player and administrator. She was a member of international jewel thief network Pink Panthers.

== Basketball career ==
=== Playing career ===
Ćirković spent her career with Voždovac, Crvena zvezda, Jedinstvo Tuzla (Bosnia and Herzegovina), Pagrati Athens (Greece) and Celje (Slovenia).

=== National team career ===
Ćirković was a member of the Yugoslavia women's national under-18 basketball team that won the bronze medal at the 1988 European Championship for Junior Woman together with Nina Bjedov, Danira Nakić, Eleonora Wild, Danijela Ilić and others. Over two tournament games, she averaged 1.5 points per game.

=== Post-playing career ===
After retirement from playing career, Ćirković worked as a sports director for Crvena zvezda.

== Criminal career ==
Ćirković is the infamous female member of the international jewel thief network Pink Panthers. She was the mastermind behind a team of criminals raiding jewellery stores in Greece. She was convicted and arrested twice for her personal involvement in those crimes. The first arrest was in 2006. In March 2012 she got caught again and was arrested a second time. On 12 July 2012, she managed to successfully escape from the central prison of Athens. She escaped on foot to her native country Serbia before gathering her criminal team again to plan & execute the next robbery - again in Athens on 26 November 2012. On 29 November 2012, she was arrested and convicted to a total of 32 years of prison in Corydallos penitentiary. In a later trial, her lawyer managed to convince the court to dismiss some of the charges and due to a general amnesty in 2017, she finally spent only 5 years in prison.

== Personal life ==
Ćirković has one son who also plays basketball.

== Works ==
- Ćirković, Olivera (2016). Pink Panter – Moja zatvorska ispovest. ISBN 978-86-521-2175-5.
- Ćirković, Olivera (2018). Ja, Pink Panter: Ispovest.
- Ćirković, Olivera (2019). Ja, Pink Panter 2 – Arhondisa
- Ćirković, Olivera (2021). Ja, Pink Panter 3 - Povratak
