= Comtesse de Vendome =

Diamond necklace stolen in 2004

The Comtesse de Vendôme is a diamond necklace composed of 116 diamonds, including a centerpiece 125-carat diamond, and an estimated value of approximately 31 million dollars (in 2004). The necklace was stolen from the Tokyo jewelry boutique Le Supre-Diamant Couture de Maki on March 5, 2004 by thieves who are believed to belong to the Pink Panthers crime ring.

The Japanese police launched a massive investigation in the wake of the heist, which has been called "the greatest robbery in the history of Japan". According to their theories, the crime was perpetrated by four individuals: Serbians named Đorđe Rašović, Aleksandar Radulović, Snežana Panajotović and a Scottish woman named Dorothy Fasola. Fasola was responsible for logistic preparations and Panajotović for getaway, while Radulović and Rašović committed the actual heist. Radulović visited the boutique a couple times before the crime, posing as a well-heeled customer who was eventually shown the Comtesse de Vendome exhibition, which consisted of a glass display case and an electronic alarm. For the heist itself, he entered the boutique with Rašović trailing behind; Radulović immobilized the clerk with pepper spray and violent blows while Rašović broke the glass and taking the Comtesse. Both men, who were partially disguised with wigs and sunglasses, then made their getaway.

Within a few years, all the suspects had been arrested. During their trials, Rašović and Radulović alleged that the crime was at the behest of the store itself; a manager had contracted the heist in order to collect the insurance value of the Comtesse. Radulović insisted that the jewelry had been left in a dumpster in return for $100,000 in cash. Although this allegation has not been substantiated or considered credible by the authorities, the de Maki store appears to have been in financial difficulties and eventually filed for bankruptcy. As of 2010, the Comtesse has not been recovered, and it is likely that it was broken up and its stones sold separately in the diamond market.
