= Paragon (diamond) =

Perfect diamond

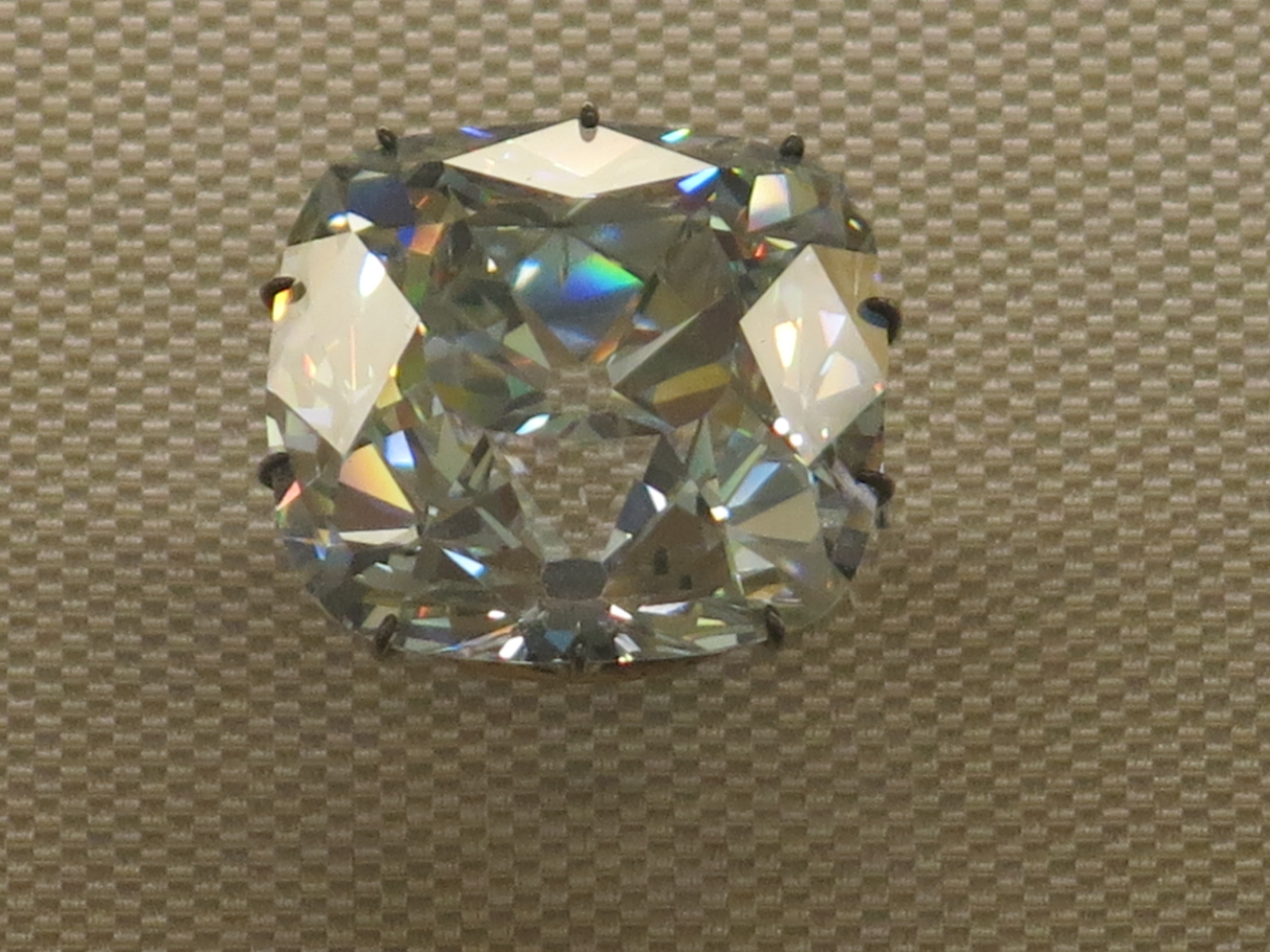
The Regent Diamond, or Diamant le Régent, a paragon

In gemmology the term paragon refers to any flawless diamond with a mass of at least 100 carats.

Currently the largest flawless natural diamond (as opposed to synthetic diamond) in the world is known as The Paragon, a D-color gem weighing 137.82 carats (27.564 g), and the tenth largest natural white diamond in the world. The gem was mined in Brazil and attracted attention for being an exceptional white, flawless stone of great size. The Mayfair-based jeweller Graff Diamonds acquired the stone in Antwerp, cut it into an unusual seven-sided kite shield configuration, and set it in a necklace which separates to both necklace and bracelet lengths. Apart from the main stone, this necklace also contains rare pink, blue, and yellow diamonds, making a total mass of 190.27 carats (38.054 g). The necklace has associations with the end of the millennium and was worn by model Naomi Campbell at a diamond gala held by De Beers and Versace at Syon House in 1999.

== See also ==
- List of diamonds
