= Graff (jewellers) =

British multinational jewelry company

Graff Diamonds International Ltd.

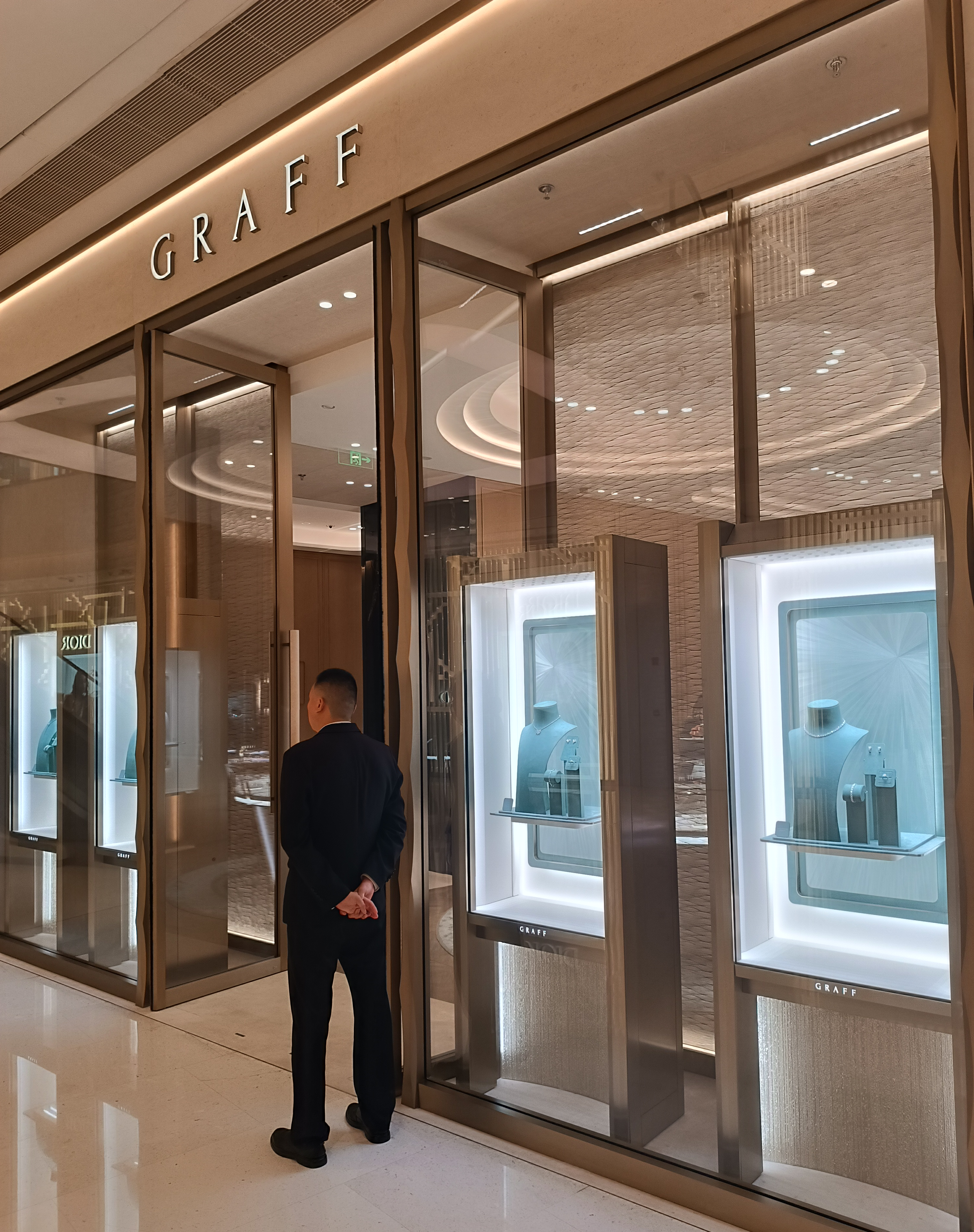
- Outlet in Shenzhen
- Industry: Jeweller, Watchmaker
- Founded: 1960
- Founder: Laurence Graff
- Headquarters: London, United Kingdom
- Number of locations: 64 (2023)
- Area served: Worldwide
- Key people: Laurence Graff (Chairman)
- Number of employees: 500
- Website: graff.com

Graff is a British multinational jeweller based in London. It was founded by British jeweller Laurence Graff in 1960. A vertically integrated company, Graff operations comprise the design, manufacture and retail distribution of jewellery and watches.

== Awards ==
Graff were the first ever jewellers to receive the Queen's Award for Industry and Export (now known as the King's Award for Enterprise), awarded in 1973. Since then, the company has received this award a further four times, most recently in 2014.

== Sourcing ==
Graff adheres to the Kimberley Process, never knowingly buying or trading rough diamonds from areas where this would encourage conflict or human suffering. The majority of Graff diamonds are laser engraved with unique Gemological Institute of America (GIA) tracking numbers, which whilst invisible to the naked eye, allow for their origin to be traced. Graff’s cutting and polishing processes are carried out in Johannesburg by the South African Diamond Corporation, a division of Graff.

== Notable pieces ==
=== Diamonds ===
The Windsor Yellows were acquired by Laurence Graff in 1987 in Geneva during the auction of the jewels belonging to Wallis Simpson, Duchess of Windsor. The Duchess was often photographed wearing the Windsor Yellows, a pair of clips of fancy yellow pear shaped diamonds of 51.01 and 40.22 carats respectively. "I also bought another pair of clips the Duchess had owned," Laurence Graff explains. "Of course they needed re-cutting to bring them to their full potential, I bought all four, repolished them, and eventually made the Windsor earrings."

The Paragon diamond was acquired by Graff in 1989. The Paragon is a 7-sided diamond of 137.82 carats (27.564 g), cut, and was worn as part of "millennium" necklace of round, pink, blue and yellow diamonds by Naomi Campbell in 1999.

The Lesotho Promise was acquired as a rough 603-carat (120.6 g) stone for $12.4 million in 2006. The stone was cut by a team of 35 using computer-controlled lasers into 26 D-flawless diamonds totaling 223.35 carats (44.670 g), the highest yield from a single diamond.

The Wittelsbach-Graff Diamond is a 31.06-carat (6.212 g) fancy deep-blue diamond with internally flawless clarity purchased by Laurence Graff in 2008 for £16.4 million.

The Delaire Sunrise is, at 118.08 carats, the largest square emerald cut Fancy Vivid Yellow diamond in the world. Discovered in 2008 at an alluvial mine in South Africa, the 221.81 carat rough diamond. When Laurence Graff unveiled the finished diamond, he named it "the Delaire Sunrise".

The Graff Pink was acquired by Graff in November 2010. A pink diamond with a type IIa classification and modified emerald cut shape, the diamond was previously held in a private collection for over 60 years. The diamond displayed 25 natural flaws. The recut 23.88 carat diamond displayed new colour, clarity and internal flawlessness.

The Sultan Abdul Hamid II is a 70.54 carat light yellow acquired by Graff in 1981. It has been suggested that this stone may have been cut from "The Ottoman I" which originally belonged to Suleyman the Magnificent of Turkey.

The Graff Lesedi La Rona, a 302.37 carat D color high-clarity emerald cut diamond. It is the main stone cut from the Lesedi La Rona, bought by Graff in 2017 and cut in 2019. The cutting of the rough stone also produced 66 smaller stones. According to Graff, the stone is the "largest highest clarity, highest color diamond ever graded by the Gemological Institute of America (GIA)".

=== Jewellery ===
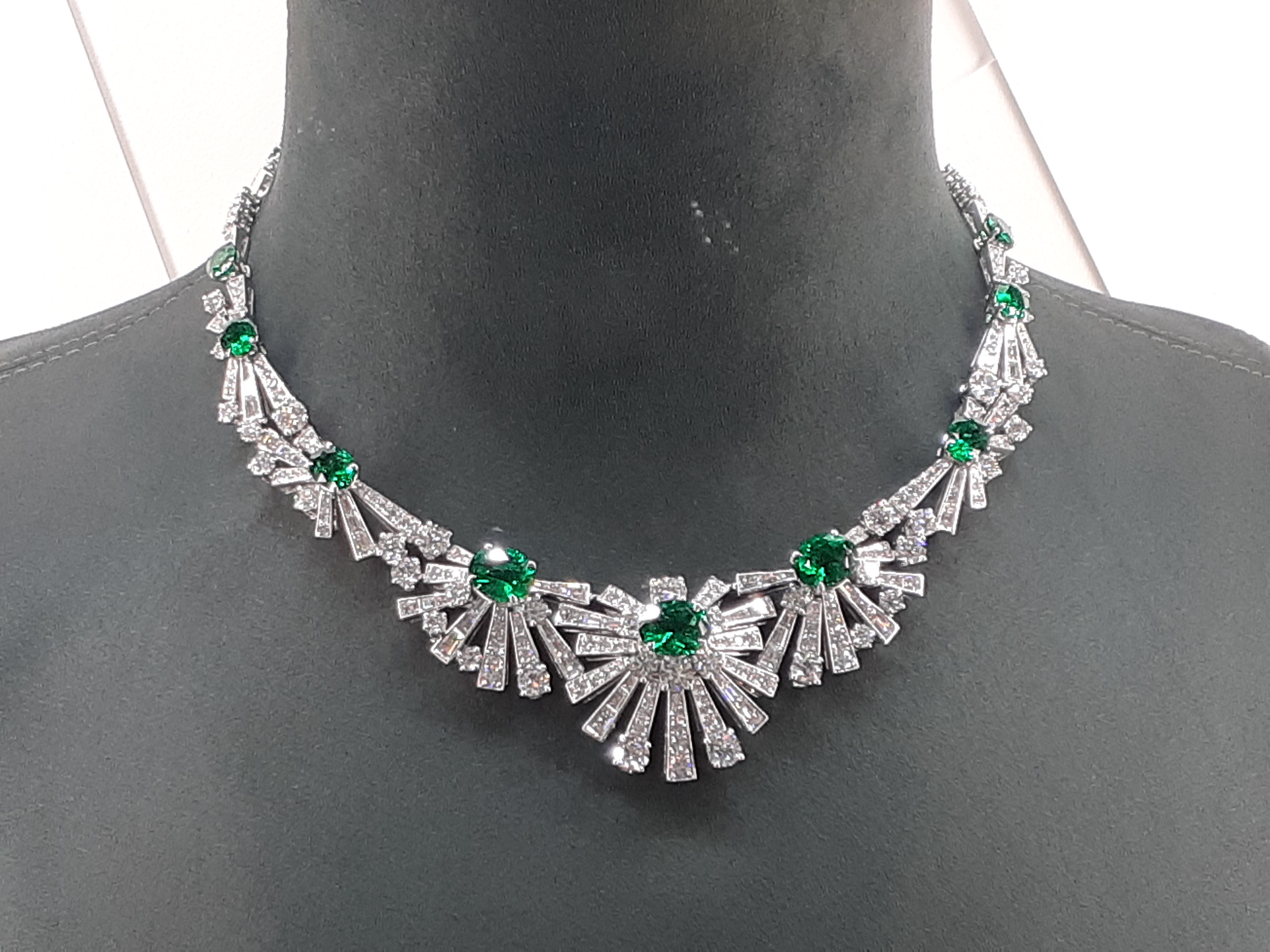
Necklace

The Peacock Brooch takes the form of a peacock with a display of fanned tail feathers, this diamond brooch features a collection of coloured diamonds. A total of 120.81 carats of diamonds adorn the brooch, which measures a little over 10 cm in height. At the heart of the brooch, sits a 20.02 carat deep blue pear shape diamond. The piece also features an additional clasp to the rear, allowing the blue diamond centrepiece to be removed and worn two ways.

This piece was unveiled in 2013 and priced at $100 million. As of 2015, the brooch had sold for $120 million.

The Hallucination watch was unveiled at Baselworld in 2014, with Graff claiming it as the most expensive watch created at $55 million. It is made with 110 carats of fancy colour diamonds and has a quartz movement.

In 2010, Graff launched its first proprietary movement, the Graff Calibre 1, which can be found in the GraffStar GrandDate. The Graff Calibre 2 movement was unveiled in Basel in 2011 with the ScubaGraff diver's watch. The Graff Calibre 3 movement was unveiled in 2012 with the GraffStar Slim. Finally, 2013 saw the launch of the Graff Calibre 4 with the MasterGraff Ultra Flat Tourbillon.

== Locations ==
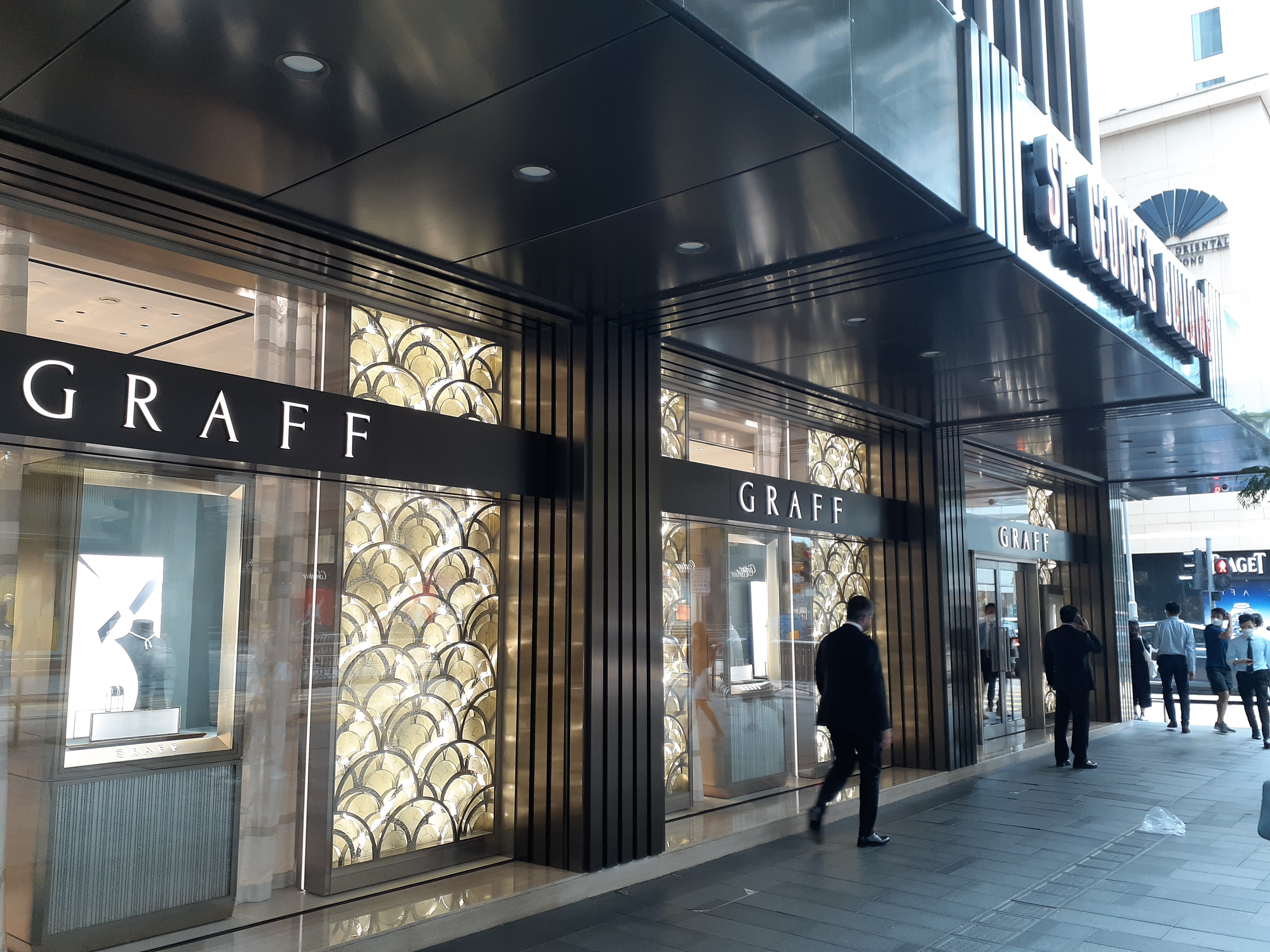
Shop at St George's Building, Central, Hong Kong

Graff has over 50 stores around the world, with their first location outside of the UK located in Monaco's Hôtel de Paris in 2000. Their largest boutique is in Rue Saint-Honoré, Paris, their second in the city.

Graff has corporate offices in London, New York, Geneva, Hong Kong and Tokyo.

== Robberies ==
Graff has been the target of several robberies.

In 1980, two Chicago-based gangsters armed with a handgun and a hand grenade stole jewellery valued at £1.5 million from the Sloane Street premises. Mafiosi Joseph Scalise and Arthur Rachel, who took "less than a minute" to commit the crime, were apprehended eleven hours later in the United States and were extradited to England where they were tried, convicted and imprisoned for nine years. Their haul had included the 26 carat Marlborough diamond, worth £400,000 at the time, which has never been recovered.

In 1993, the firm's Hatton Garden workshop premises was robbed of jewellery valued at £7 million. The robbery was attributed to a group of armed robbers known as The Rascal Gang due to the Bedford Rascal vans they used.

In 2003, the New Bond Street premises was robbed by two men from the Pink Panthers international jewel thief network, who stole 47 pieces of jewellery worth £23 million.

In 2005, three armed robbers stole jewellery valued at £2 million from the Sloane Street premises.

In 2007, two robbers, who arrived at the Sloane Street premises in a chauffeur-driven Bentley Continental Flying Spur, threatened staff at gunpoint and stole jewellery worth £10 million. In the same year, the Graff premises in Wafi City, Dubai was targeted by the Pink Panthers again, using two Audi A8 cars to carry out a ram raid. Jewellery worth AED14.7 million (£2.4 million) was taken, although later recovered when two of the gang, both Serbians, were arrested.

In the 2009 Graff Diamonds robbery, which took place on 6 August, two armed robbers stole 43 items with a total worth of nearly £40 million. It was believed to be the largest ever gems heist in Britain at the time, and the second-largest British robbery after the £53 million raid on a Securitas depot in Kent in 2006.
