= 2009 Graff Diamonds robbery =

Robbery on New Bond Street, London

CCTV image released by the Metropolitan Police depicting two of the robbers entering Graff Diamonds. They were later identified as Craig Calderwood (front) and Aman Kassaye.

The Graff Diamonds robbery took place on 6 August 2009 when two men posing as customers entered the premises of Graff Diamonds in New Bond Street, London and stole jewellery worth nearly £40 million (US$65 million). It was believed to be the largest ever gems heist in Britain at the time, and the second largest British robbery after the £53 million raid on a Securitas depot in Tonbridge, Kent, in 2006. The robbers' haul totalled 43 items of jewellery, consisting of rings, bracelets, necklaces and wristwatches. One necklace alone has been reported as being worth more than £3.5m. Britain's previous largest jewellery robbery also took place at Graff's, in 2003.

== The robbery ==
The robbers used the services of a professional make-up artist (British drag queen La Voix) to alter their skin tones and their features using latex prosthetics and to be fitted with professional wigs. The artist took four hours to apply the disguises, having been told that it was for a music video. Viewing the results in a mirror, Aman Kassaye commented: "My own mother wouldn't recognise me now," to which his accomplice is reported to have laughed and replied: "That's got to be a good thing, hasn't it?" The same make-up studio had unwittingly helped disguise members of the gang that robbed the Securitas depot in 2006.

On 6 August 2009 at 16:40, two sharply dressed men arrived at the Graff Diamonds jewellery store in New Bond Street, Central London, by taxi and once inside produced two handguns which they used to threaten staff. They made no attempt to conceal their faces from the premises' CCTV cameras due to their elaborate disguises. Even though one of the robbers was wearing leather gloves, store security allowed him entry, being used to the eccentric behaviour of some super-wealthy clients.

Petra Ehnar, a shop assistant, was forced at gunpoint to empty the store's display cabinets. A total of 43 rings, bracelets, necklaces and watches were taken. She was briefly held hostage at gunpoint and was forced into the street during the getaway. She testified that the robbers told her that she would be killed if she did not carry out their demands. After releasing the hostage outside the store, one of the robbers fired a shot into the air to create confusion, and both escaped the scene in a blue BMW vehicle. This vehicle was abandoned in nearby Dover Street, where a second gunshot was fired into the ground while the robbers switched to a second vehicle, a silver Mercedes. They again switched vehicles in Farm Street, after which there was no further information regarding their whereabouts.

All of the diamonds had been laser-inscribed with the Graff logo and a Gemological Institute of America identification number.

Detectives investigating the robbery stated: "They knew exactly what they were looking for and we suspect they already had a market for the jewels." The suspects' details were circulated to all ports and airports but police believed they would have an elaborately prepared escape route and had already left the country.

The robbery was being investigated by Barnes Flying Squad, headed by Detective Chief Inspector Pam Mace.

=== Financial loss to Graff Diamonds ===
The financial loss to Graff Diamonds was more than £6.6 million (US$10M). The actual value of the pieces for insurance purposes, was put at £26 million. But according to Nicholas Paine, the company secretary, the syndicate that insured Graff, was only liable for £20 million.

== Arrests and charges ==
A pay-as-you-go mobile phone was discovered that robbers Kassaye and Craig Calderwood left in the car after ramming into a black cab. After the collision, in their haste to transfer to a second vehicle, the robbers forgot the mobile phone that was wedged between the driver's seat and the handbrake. Anonymous numbers stored on the mobile phone quickly allowed police to discover the identity of the robbers.

On 20 August 2009, two men, Calderwood, 26, of no fixed abode, and Solomun Beyene, 24, of Lilestone Road, London NW8, were charged in connection with the robbery. On 21 August, a third man, Clinton Mogg, 42, of Westby Road, Bournemouth, Dorset, was also charged, and Calderwood and Beyene were remanded in custody by Westminster Magistrates' Court. On 22 August, Mogg appeared at Westminster Magistrates' Court. All three were remanded in custody to appear at Kingston upon Thames Crown Court on 1 September. A fourth man, aged 50, was arrested and bailed. By mid-October, ten male suspects had been arrested in connection with the robbery. Charges brought against the individuals include conspiracy with others to commit robbery, attempted murder, holding someone hostage, possessing firearms and using a handgun to resist arrest.

Kassaye, who planned and executed the heist, was found guilty of conspiracy to rob, kidnap and possession of a firearm after a three-month trial at Woolwich Crown Court. On 7 August 2010, he was sentenced to 23 years in prison. Three other men – Beyene, 25, of London, Mogg, 43, of Bournemouth, and Thomas Thomas, 46, of Kingston upon Thames – were each jailed for 16 years after also being convicted of conspiracy to rob. Calderwood was finally jailed for 21 years.

As of March 2011, none of the stolen jewellery has been recovered. Experts believe the jewellery has probably been broken up so the precious stones could be anonymously resold after being recut.

== See also ==
- List of bank robbers and robberies
- List of heists in the United Kingdom
- List of missing treasure
- Major crimes in the United Kingdom
