= Milan Poparić =

Bosnian Serb criminal

- Born: 1978 (age 47–48) or 1979 (age 46–47); Bosnia
- Allegiance: Pink Panthers

Milan Poparić (born 1978/1979) is a Bosnian Serb criminal, primarily a jewel thief. He is known for a dramatic escape from prison in July 2013. He has been identified by police as a member of a gang of jewel thieves called the Pink Panthers.

== Career ==
Poparić is a known member of the international gang of jewel thieves called the Pink Panthers, who were given that name after hiding a diamond in face cream, similar to a theft portrayed in the movie The Return of the Pink Panther. The Pink Panthers have been said to have stolen around $436 million since 1999.

Poparić was imprisoned for a sentence of six years and eight months in 2009 for the robbery of Swiss jewelry in the city of Neuchâtel. He was imprisoned in Orbe but not in the high-security area; a communication officer in the prison said, "We were never told...that Poparic was a member of Pink Panther group" and that had they known, he would have been kept in a different section.

=== Escape ===
Poparić escaped with Adrian Albrecht, a Swiss man accused of robbery, arson, and money laundering. The escape involved two accomplices outside of the prison who rammed the prison gate and subdued the guards by firing AK-47s. Poparić and Albrecht then climbed over the barbed wire with ladders brought by the accomplices. Poparić was the third member of the Pink Panthers to escape from a prison in Switzerland between May and July 2013, and his escape was described as having "resembled a scene out of a summer action film".
