= Carlton Cannes Hotel =

Hotel in Cannes, France

Coordinates: 43°32′58″N 7°1′38″E

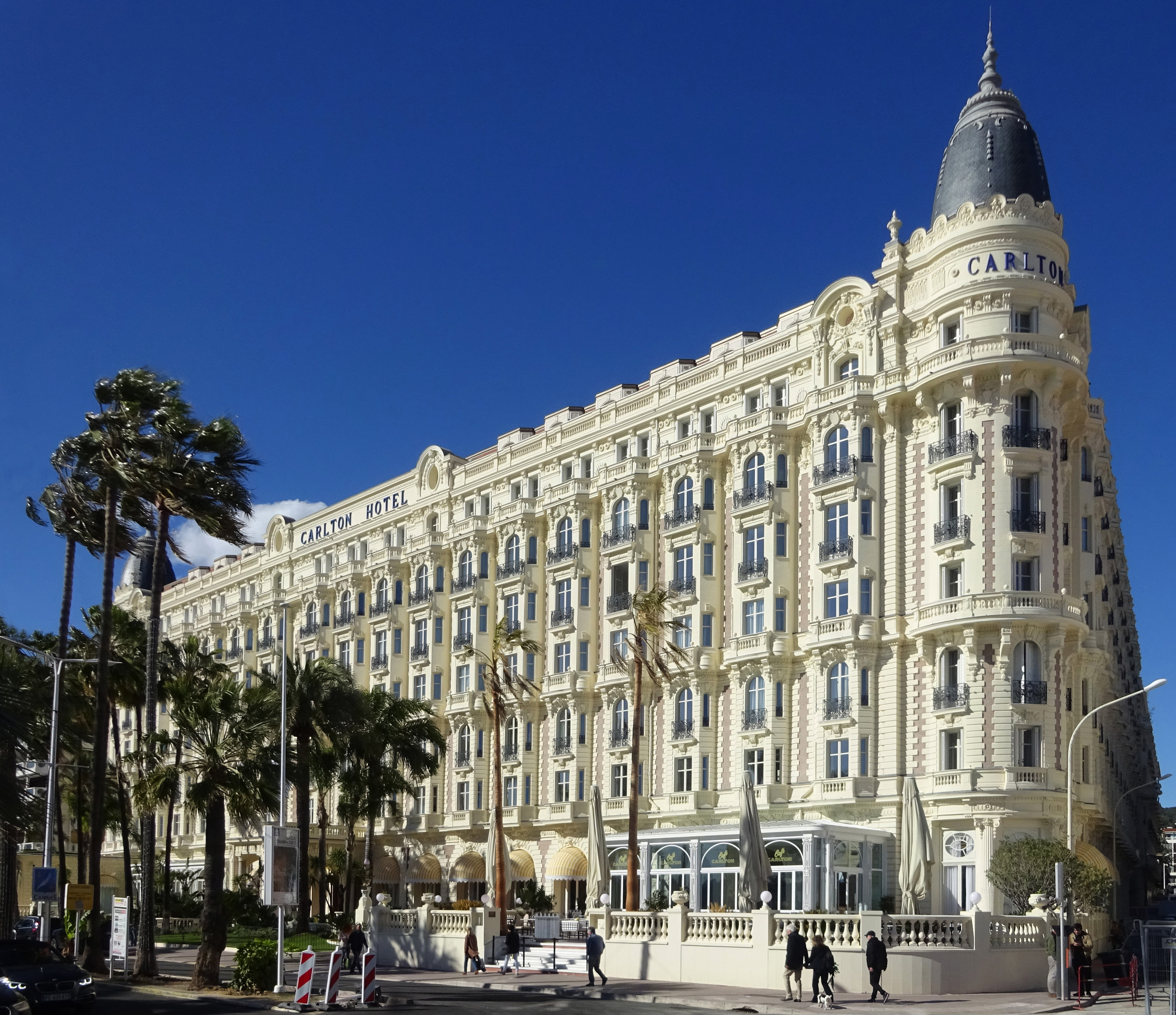
- Interactive map of the Carlton Cannes Hotel area

General information
- Type: Luxury hotel
- Architectural style: Neorenaissance
- Location: 58 La Croisette; Cannes, France
- Opened: 1911
- Owner: IHG Hotels & Resorts
- Management: InterContinental

Technical details
- Floor count: 7

Other information
- Number of rooms: 332

Website
- carltoncannes.com

The Carlton Cannes, a Regent Hotel is a historic 332 room luxury hotel opened in 1911, located at 58 La Croisette in Cannes on the French Riviera in France. It is famous for hosting movie stars from around the world during the annual Cannes Film Festival. Following major renovations, it reopened on 13 March 2023.

== History ==
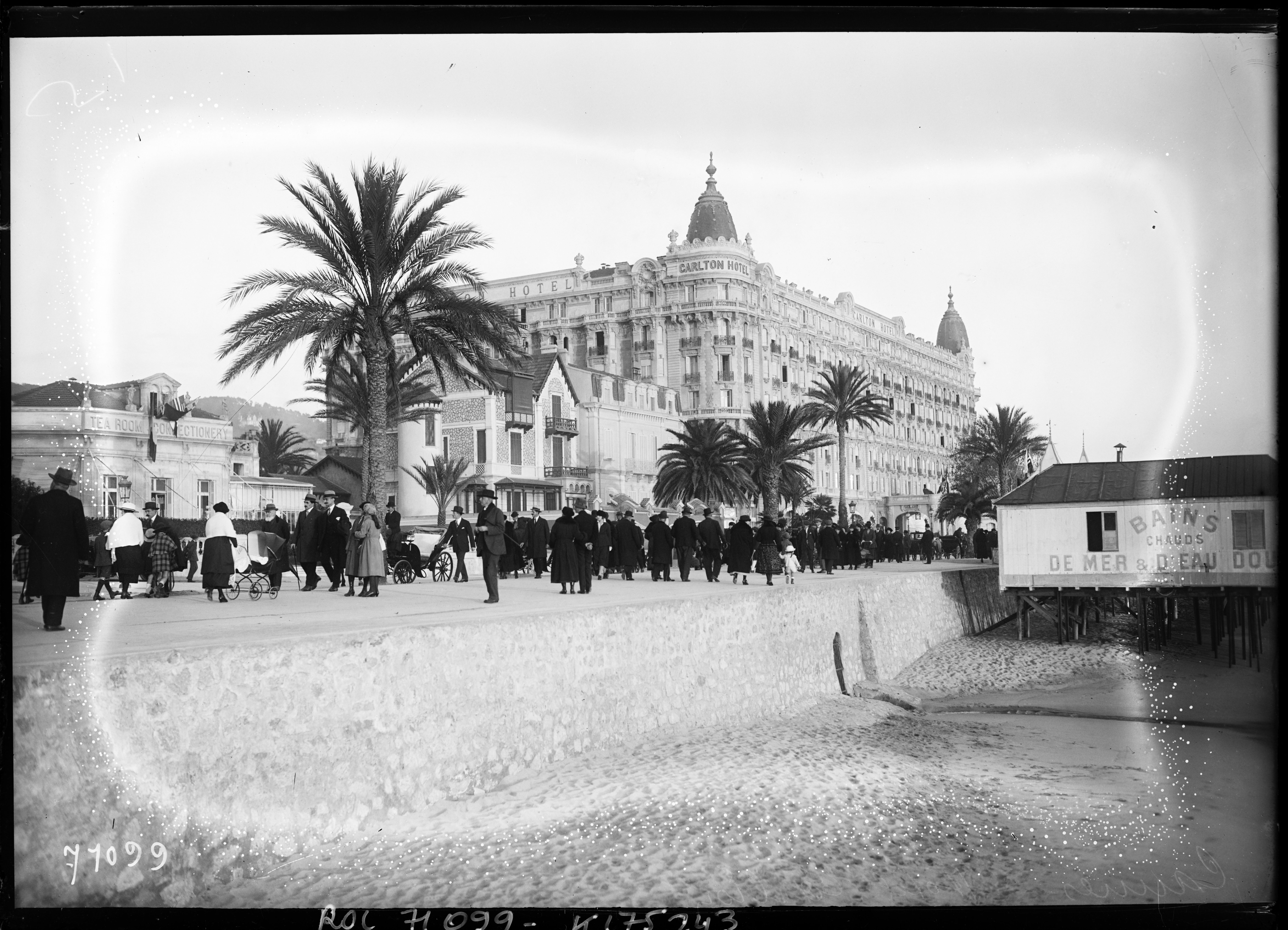
Carlton Hotel in 1922

The Carlton Hotel was constructed from 1909 to 1910 by Swiss hotelier Henry Ruhl, and designed by architects Charles Dalmas and Marcellin Mayère. Grand Duke Michael Mikhailovich of Russia contributed to the financing of the hotel. The hotel opened on 30 January 1911. It was such a huge success that the hotel acquired the adjoining Hotel de la Plage, on its western side, and demolished it for construction of a new wing from 1912 to 1913, which doubled the hotel's size and gave it its present form.

In the late 1960s, the hotel was acquired by UK-based Maxwell Joseph's Grand Metropolitan hotel group. In September 1981, Grand Metropolitan acquired Inter-Continental Hotels from PanAm and on 1 April 1982, they merged their own hotel operations with Inter-Continental, placing 17 of their own hotels within that chain, including the Carlton, which became the Carlton Inter-Continental Cannes. The hotel chain was reorganized as InterContinental Hotels Group in 2003, and the hotel became the InterContinental Carlton Cannes.

In June 2006, InterContinental Hotels Group sold the Carlton to investment bank Morgan Stanley, along with six other InterContinental properties in Amsterdam, Budapest, Rome, Frankfurt, Madrid and Vienna for 634 million euros, while retaining management of the properties.

In April 2011, Morgan Stanley re-sold the portfolio of seven properties to Lebanese businessman Toufic Aboukhater at a loss, for 450 million euros. In 2014, Katara Hospitality, owned by the government of Qatar, purchased the Carlton, along with four other properties in the portfolio, in Amsterdam, Frankfurt, Madrid and Rome.

After closing due to the COVID-19 pandemic in March 2020, the hotel reopened briefly in August, only to close again on 10 September 2020, for extensive renovations. It reopened on 13 March 2023 as Carlton Cannes, a Regent Hotel. The hotel celebrated its grand reopening on 17 May 2023. The multi-day reopening celebration took place during the 2023 Cannes Film Festival and was attended by celebrities including Michael Douglas, Catherine Zeta Jones, Helen Mirren, Fan BingBing, Uma Thurman, Mads Mikkelsen, Naomi Campbell and Brie Larson.

== Design ==
The Carlton's distinctive domes on both seaward corners were reputedly designed to resemble the breasts of Caroline Otero ("La Belle Otero") the most famous courtesan of the French Riviera, during the years surrounding World War I. The Carlton's elegant seventh floor formal dining room was named La Belle Otero in her honour. The restaurant later closed, the entire seventh floor was converted to a VIP floor in 2004, containing seven luxury suites. The Carlton Restaurant "Riviera" is located on the ground floor with a large outdoor terrace, along with the Carlton Beach Restaurant. The Carlton Bar serves as a hotel lounge.

== In media ==
The hotel was a central location for the Alfred Hitchcock film To Catch a Thief, starring Grace Kelly and Cary Grant. While staying at the Carlton during the 1955 Cannes Film Festival, Kelly had an arranged meeting and photo shoot with Prince Rainier III of Monaco; they married in 1956.

In 1970, the hotel featured in the Peter Sellers/Goldie Hawn comedy There's a Girl in My Soup and exterior scenes were filmed at the entrance to the hotel and on the hotel beach. The hotel lobby scene and interior scenes were done on a set.

In the summer of 1983, the hotel and its private beach featured prominently in the music video for the Elton John song "I'm Still Standing". The video also appears in the 2019 film Rocketman. During the shooting of the video, the Carlton was the scene of a drunken party involving John and the band Duran Duran that has since become something of a legend at the hotel. Significant damage to the rooms in John's suite resulted.

Both exterior and interior shots appear in New Order's 1993 music video for the single, "World (The Price of Love)". Exterior shots of the front of the hotel and the jetty leading out of the beach appear in Steps' 1999 music video for their single "Love's Got a Hold on My Heart".

Large portions of the 1995 romantic comedy French Kiss were filmed in and around the hotel.

== Crime ==
The Carlton Cannes has been the target of several high-profile jewelry robberies.

On 11 August 1994, three men brandishing automatic weapons entered the jewelry store in the hotel and proceeded to open fire. The thieves made off with over $60 million in jewelry, and precious stones. After the investigation it was determined that the thieves were firing blanks as no bullet holes were evident. The thieves have not been apprehended.

On 28 July 2013, a thief stole $136 million in jewels from the hotel in a daylight robbery (see Carlton Intercontinental Hotel heist). The jewellery was part of a temporary exhibition by mineralogist and Israeli billionaire Lev Leviev called Leviev Diamond House. No suspects have been charged with the heist.

== Gallery ==
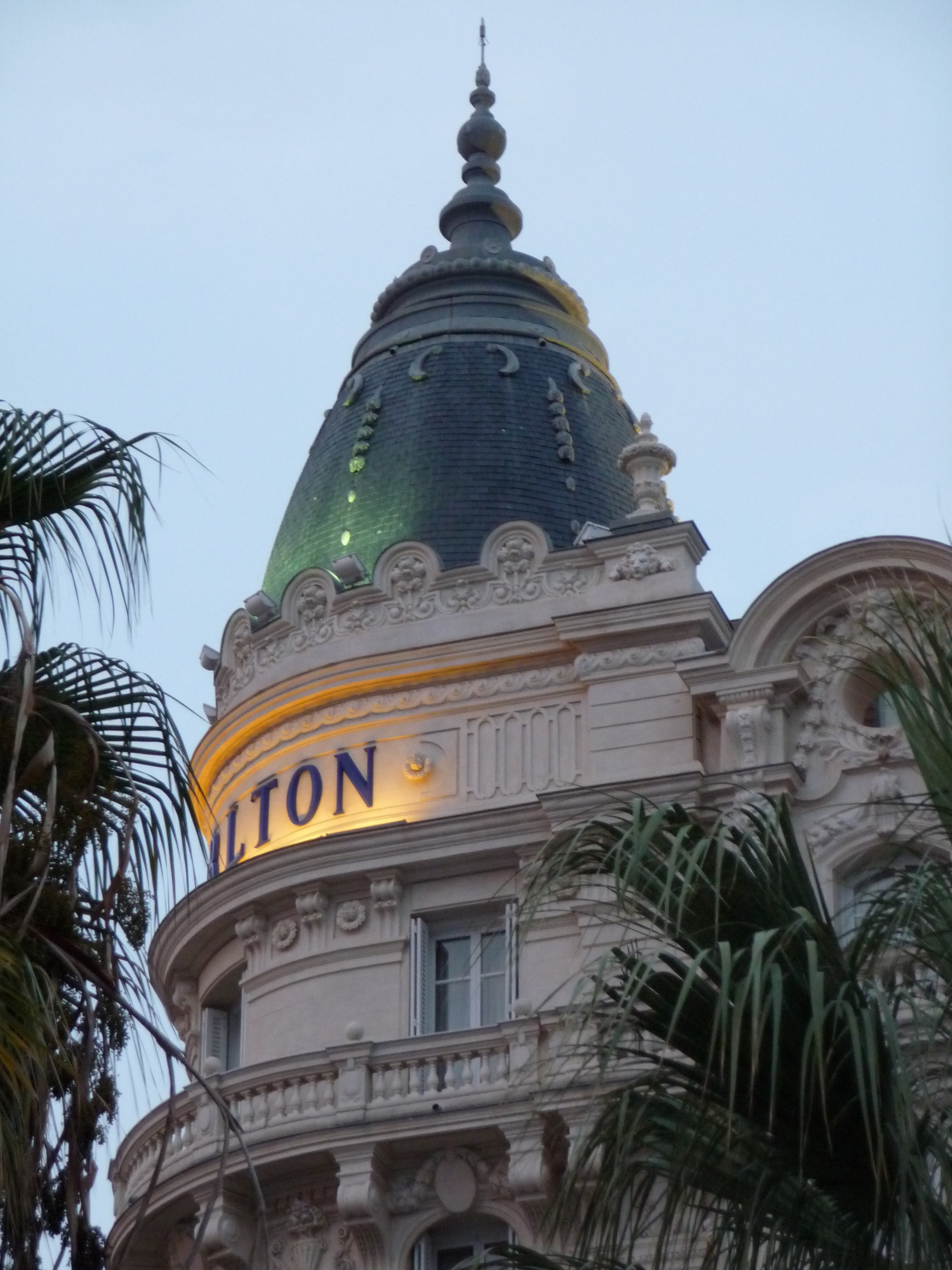
One of the domes

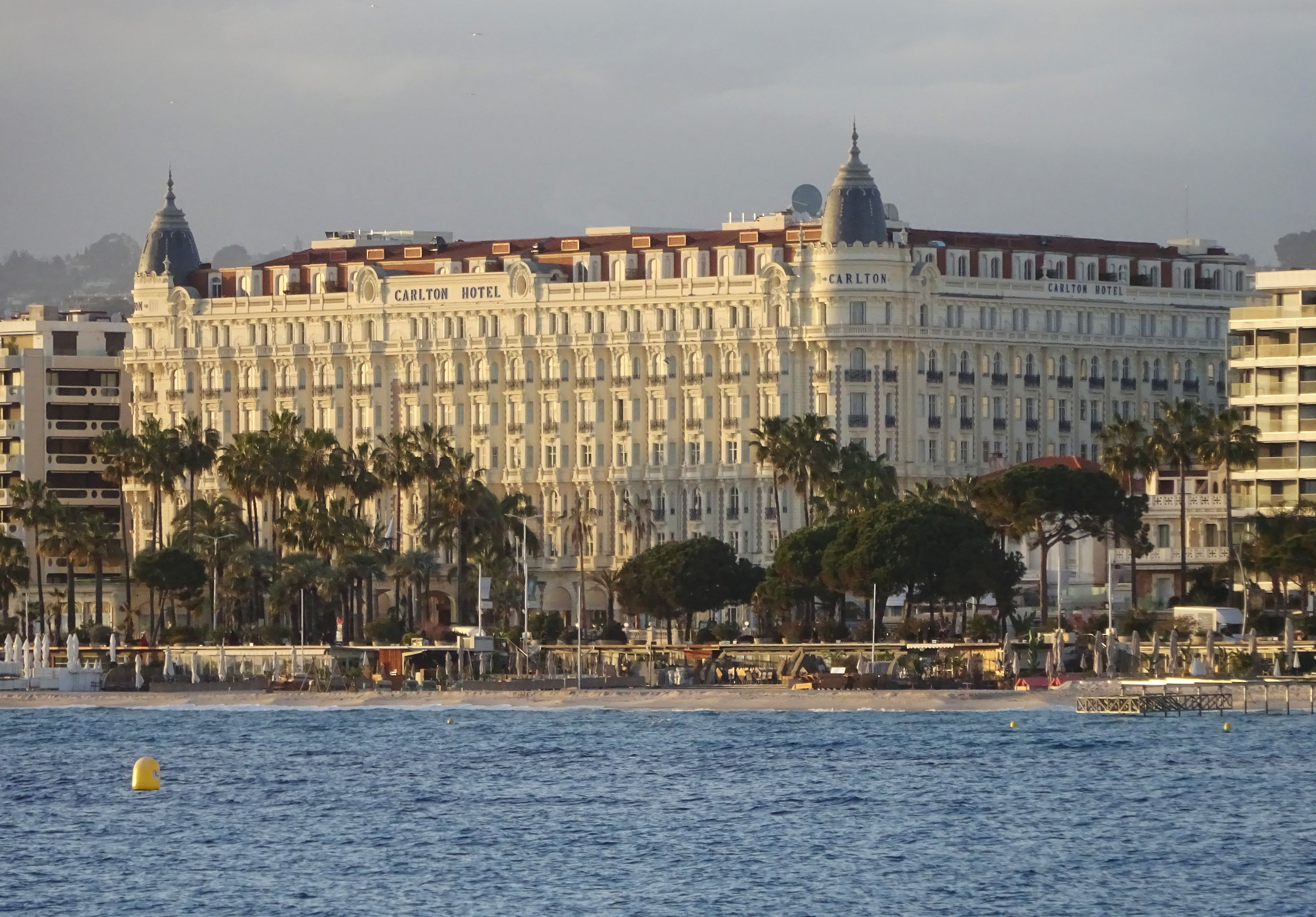
Carlton Hotel, 2023

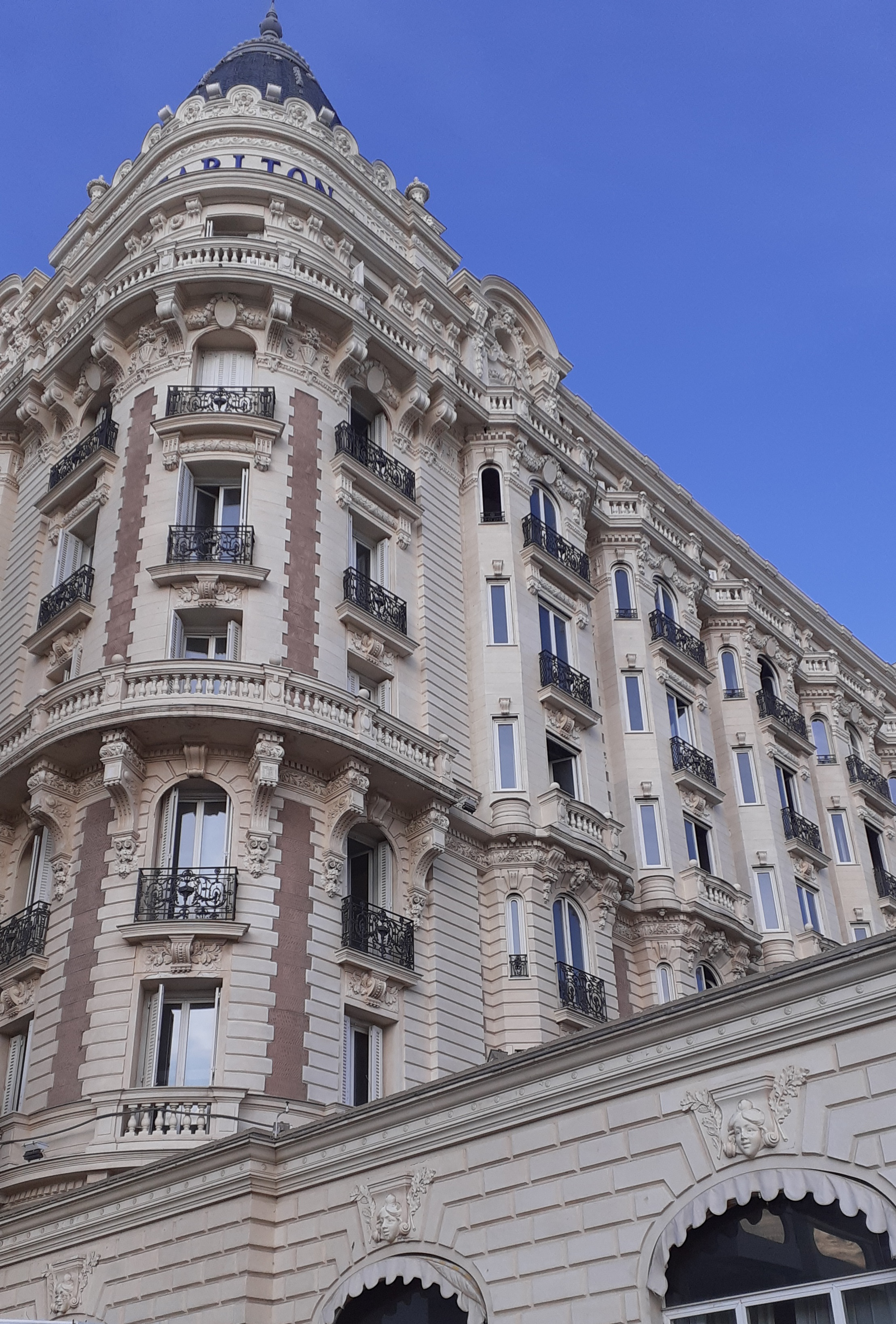
Facade of the hotel

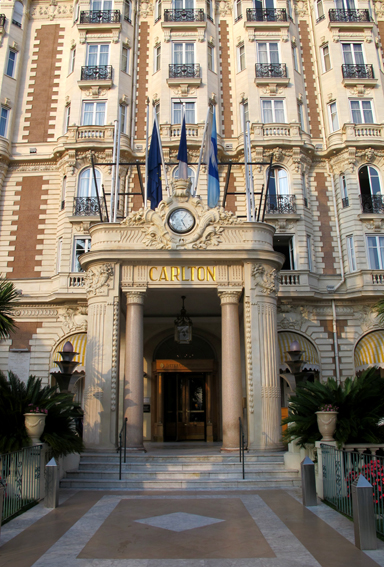
Front entrance

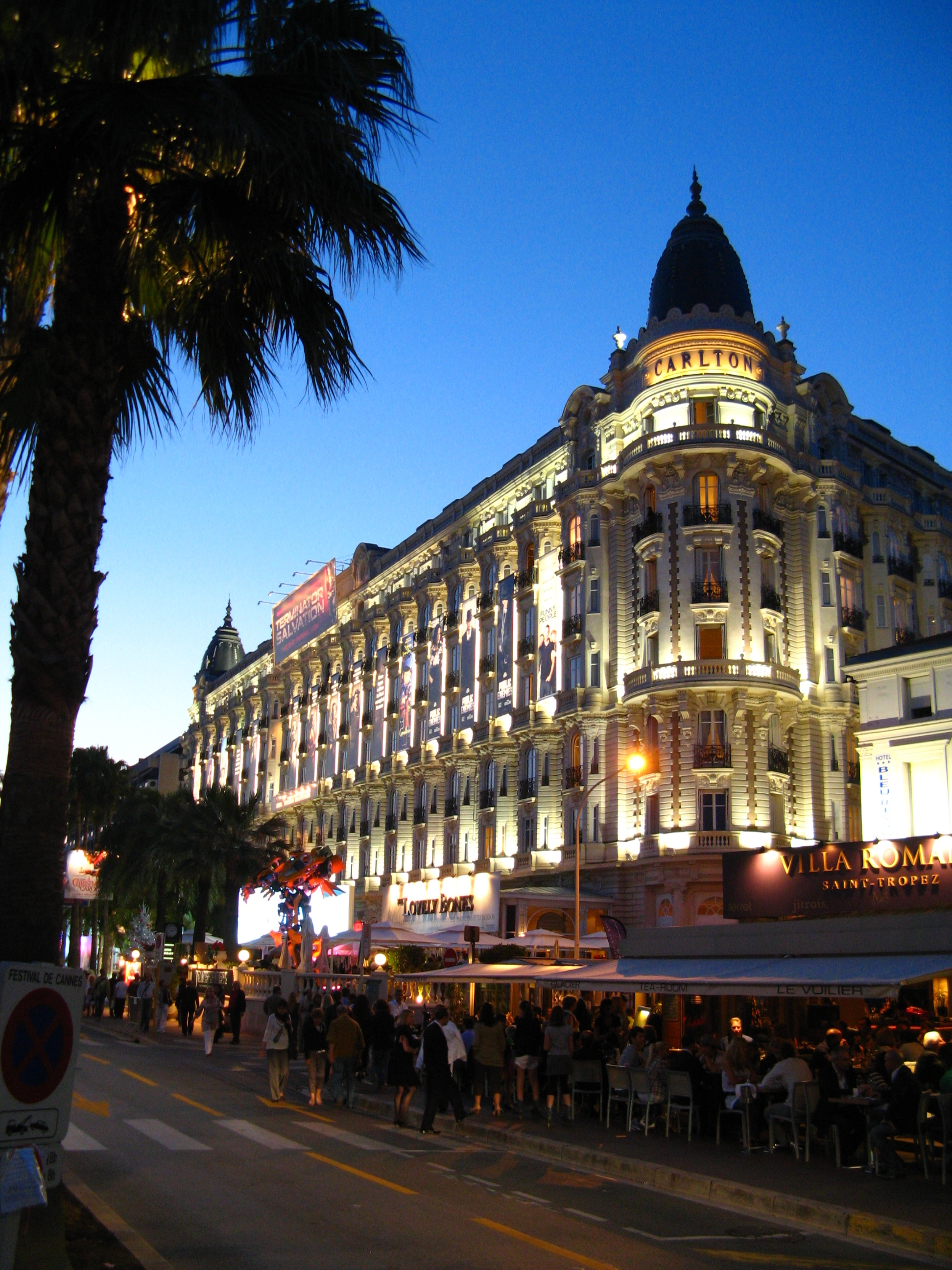
The hotel at night
