= Susana Dalmás =

Uruguayan academic and legislator (1948–2012)

Susana Elida Dalmás Garcén (July 18, 1948 – December 31, 2012) was a Uruguayan history professor, politician and member of the Broad Front coalition of political parties.

She served as a member of the Senate of Uruguay from 2010 until her death in December 2012.

Dalmás suffered a cerebral hemorrhage and stroke on December 24, 2012, and died on December 31, 2012, at the age of 64; she is buried at Tarariras Cemetery.
