= Palais de la Méditerranée =

Hotel and casino complex in Nice, France

Coordinates: 43°41′42.86″N 7°15′47.27″E

Hôtel Palais de la Méditerranée The Unbound Collection by Hyatt
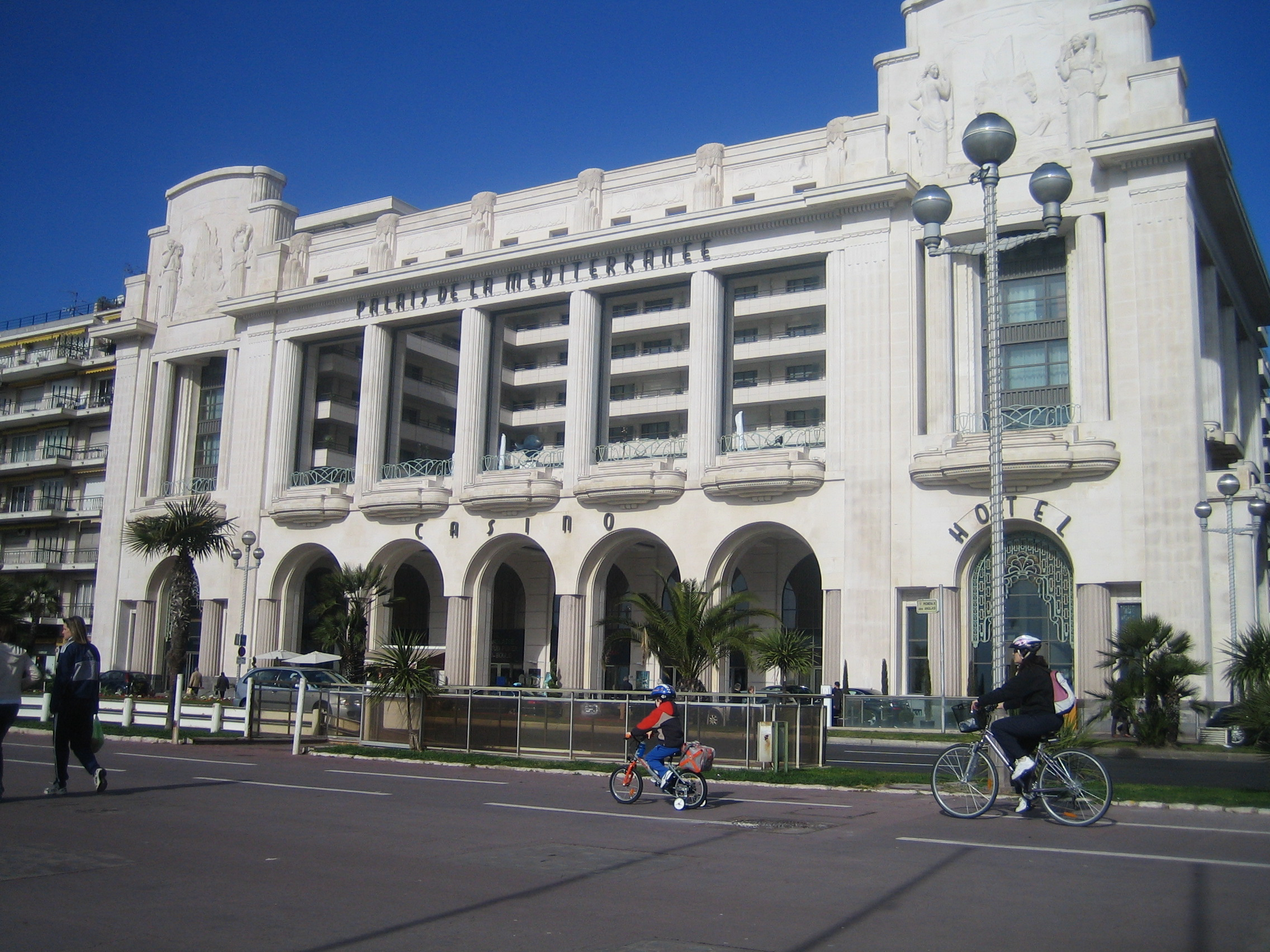
- Exterior of the Palais de la méditérranée
- Interactive map of Hôtel Palais de la Méditerranée; The Unbound Collection by Hyatt
- Location: Nice, France
- Opened: 1929
- No. of rooms: 187
- Casino type: Casino hotel
- Operating license holder: Hyatt International
- Website: https://www.hyatt.com/hyatt-regency/fr-FR/ncehr-hyatt-regency-nice-palais-de-la-mediterranee

The Palais de la Méditerranée, now known as Hôtel Palais de la Méditerranée, is a luxury hotel located at 13 Promenade des Anglais in Nice, France. Part of The Unbound Collection by Hyatt, the hotel is housed in an iconic Art Deco building constructed in 1928 and inaugurated in 1929. It is owned by Constellation Hotels Holding and operated by the international hotel group Hyatt Hotels.

== History ==
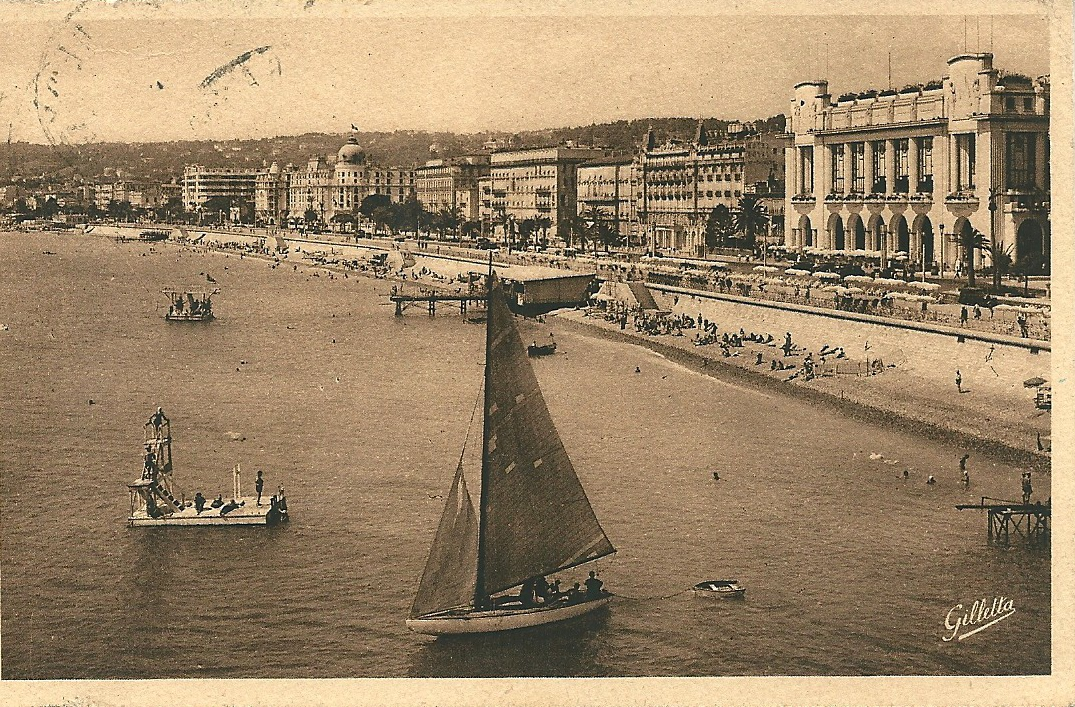
Postcard from the 1930s showing the Palais de la Méditerranée on the waterfront in Nice; the domed building on the left is the Hotel Negresco

Palais de la Méditerranée was built by architects Charles and Marcel Dalmas, in 1929 for the American millionaire Frank Jay Gould. According to Insight Guides, it "epitomised 1930s glamour with a casino, theatre, restaurant and cocktail bar". It was originally a major centre for the arts in Nice, and national and international art exhibitions were held there.

The original hotel closed in 1978. The main Art Deco facade on the Promenade des Anglais and the facade on Rue du Congrès were classified as historical monuments by order of 18 August 1989. As such, these were retained when much of the original hotel was demolished in 1990, to make way for a fully modernized hotel, with hotel rooms, apartments and a casino.

In July 2016, during Bastille Day celebrations on the Promenade, a terrorist drove a truck through crowds of people, running dozens of them down before police killed him near the Palais de la Méditerranée.

== Facilities ==
The 9-floor hotel has 187 rooms, 12 suites, and a restaurant, bar and conference rooms on the third floor, which is the main floor of the building. The rooms on the 4th floor and above all have large balconies.

== Gallery ==
Night view from the Promenade des Anglais.

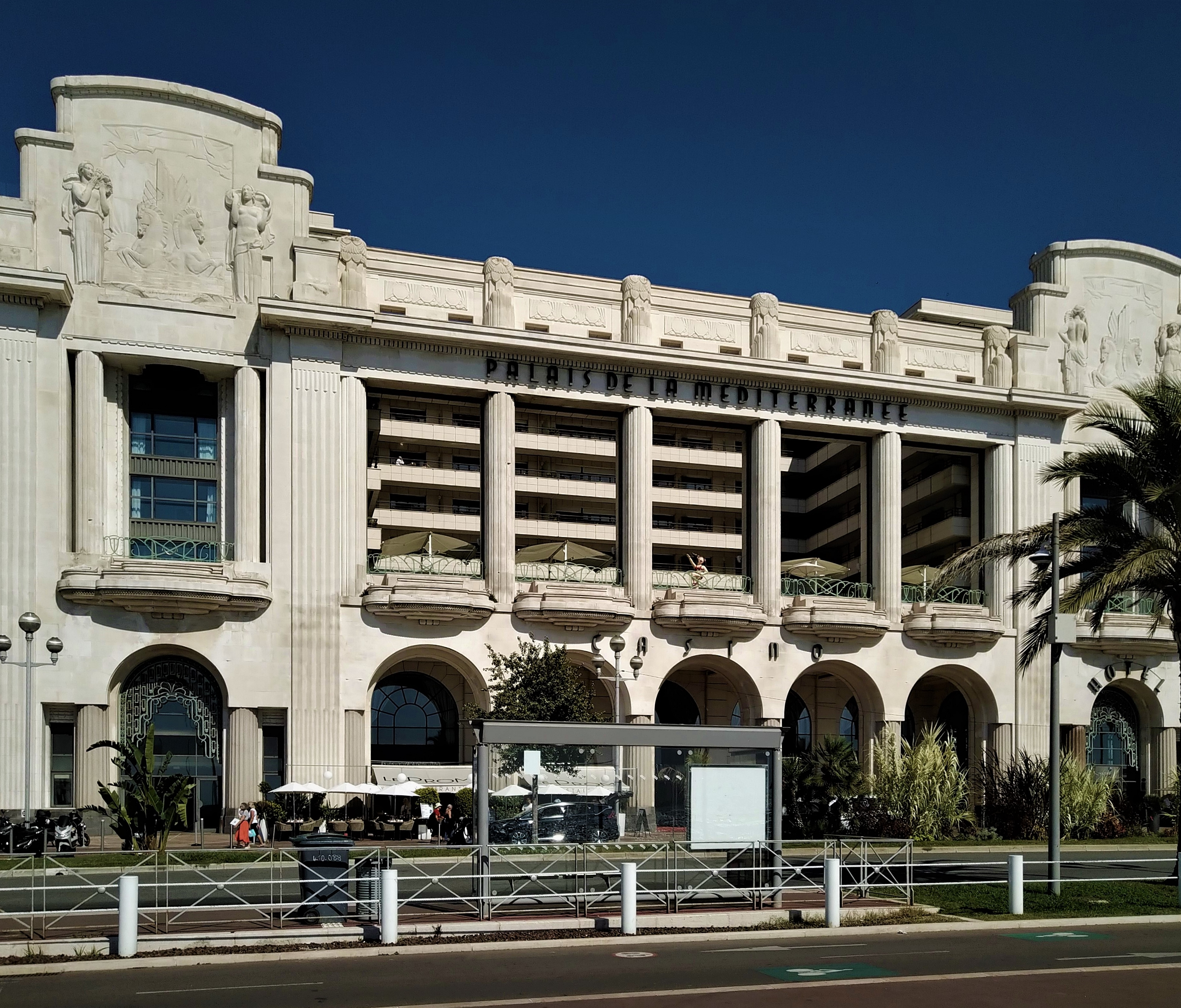
Day view from the Promenade des Anglais.

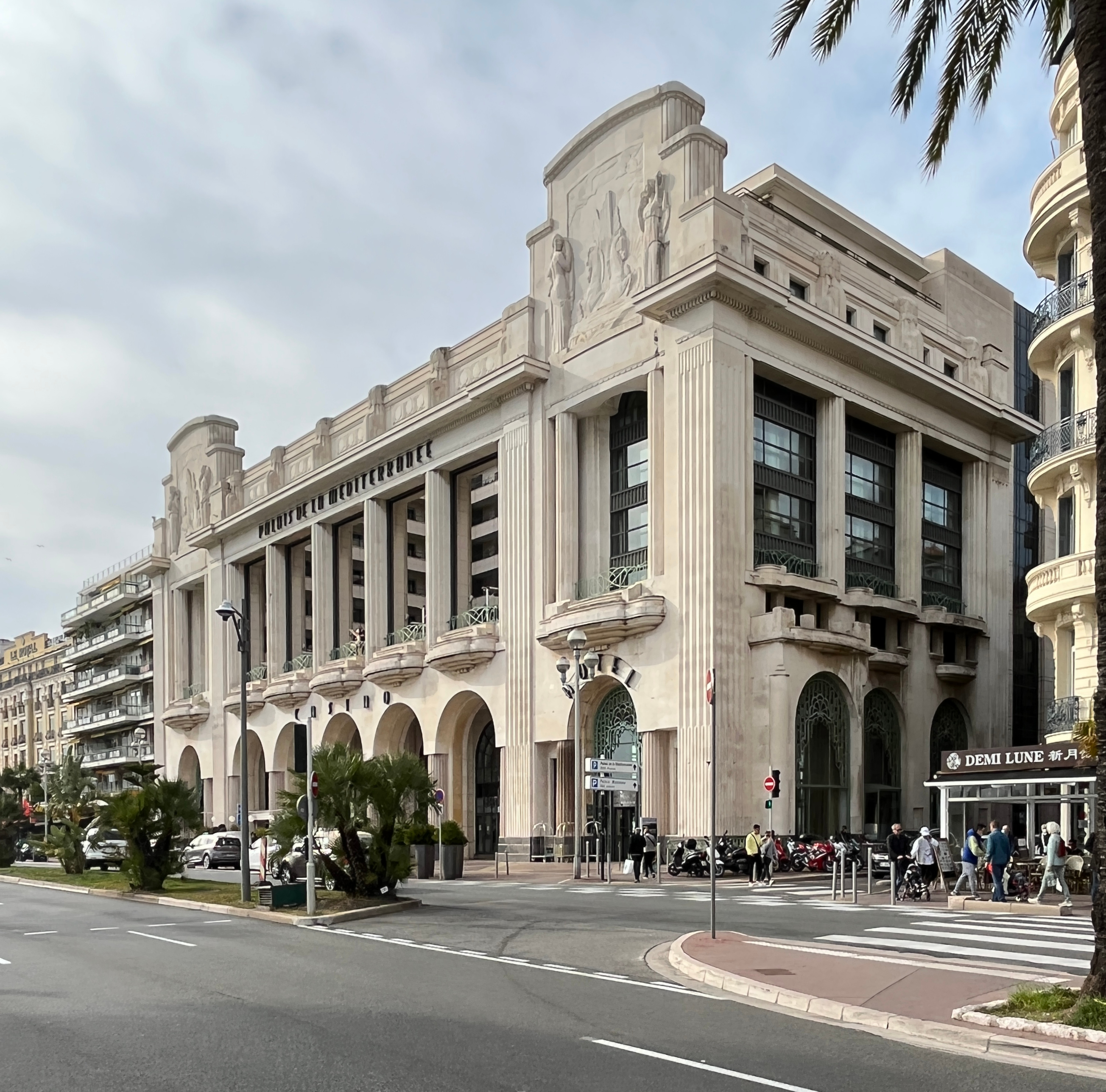
View from intersection

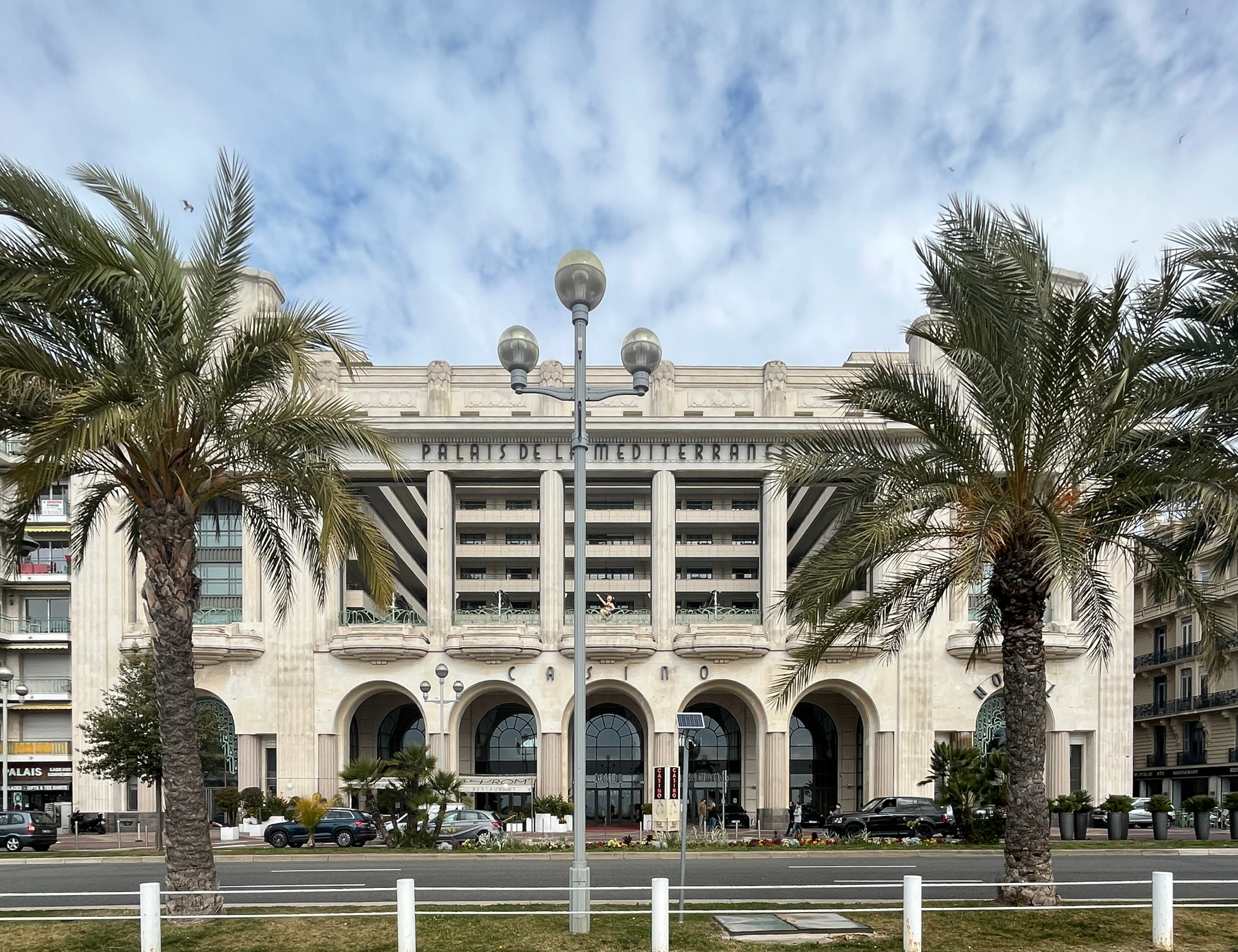
Facade as seen from the Promenade des Anglais.

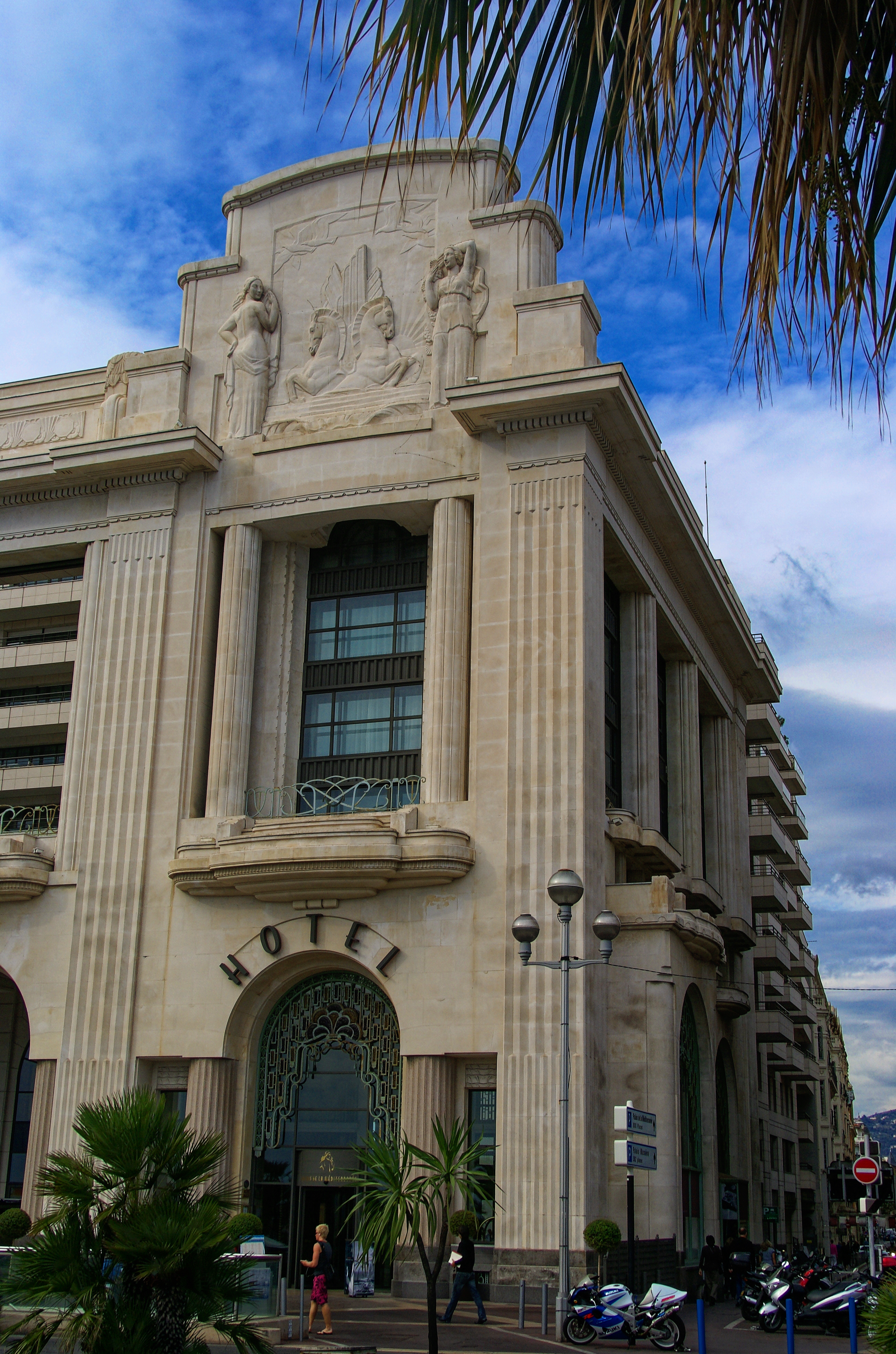
Outdoor entrance to hotel

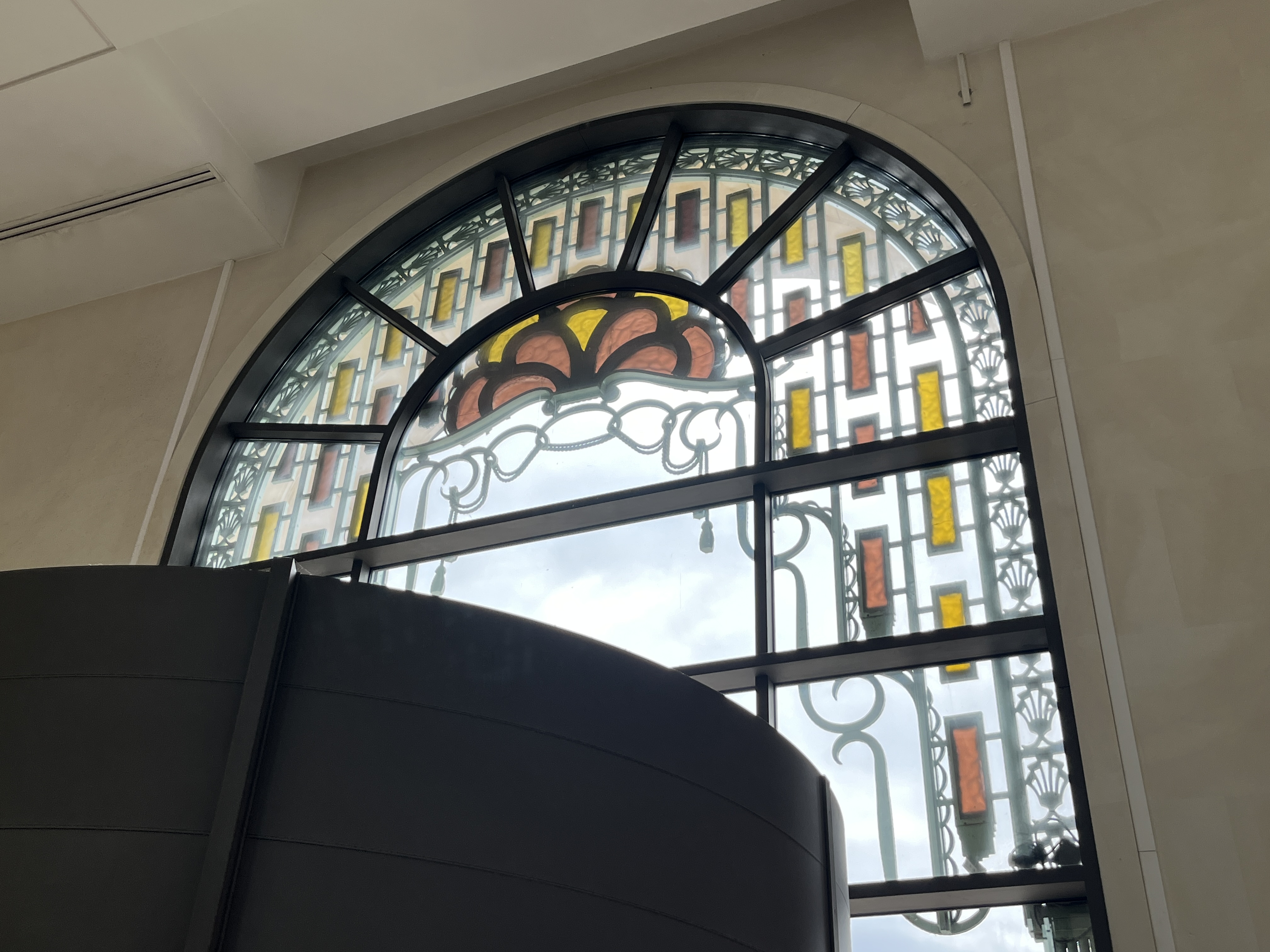
Stained glass windows in the entrance hall

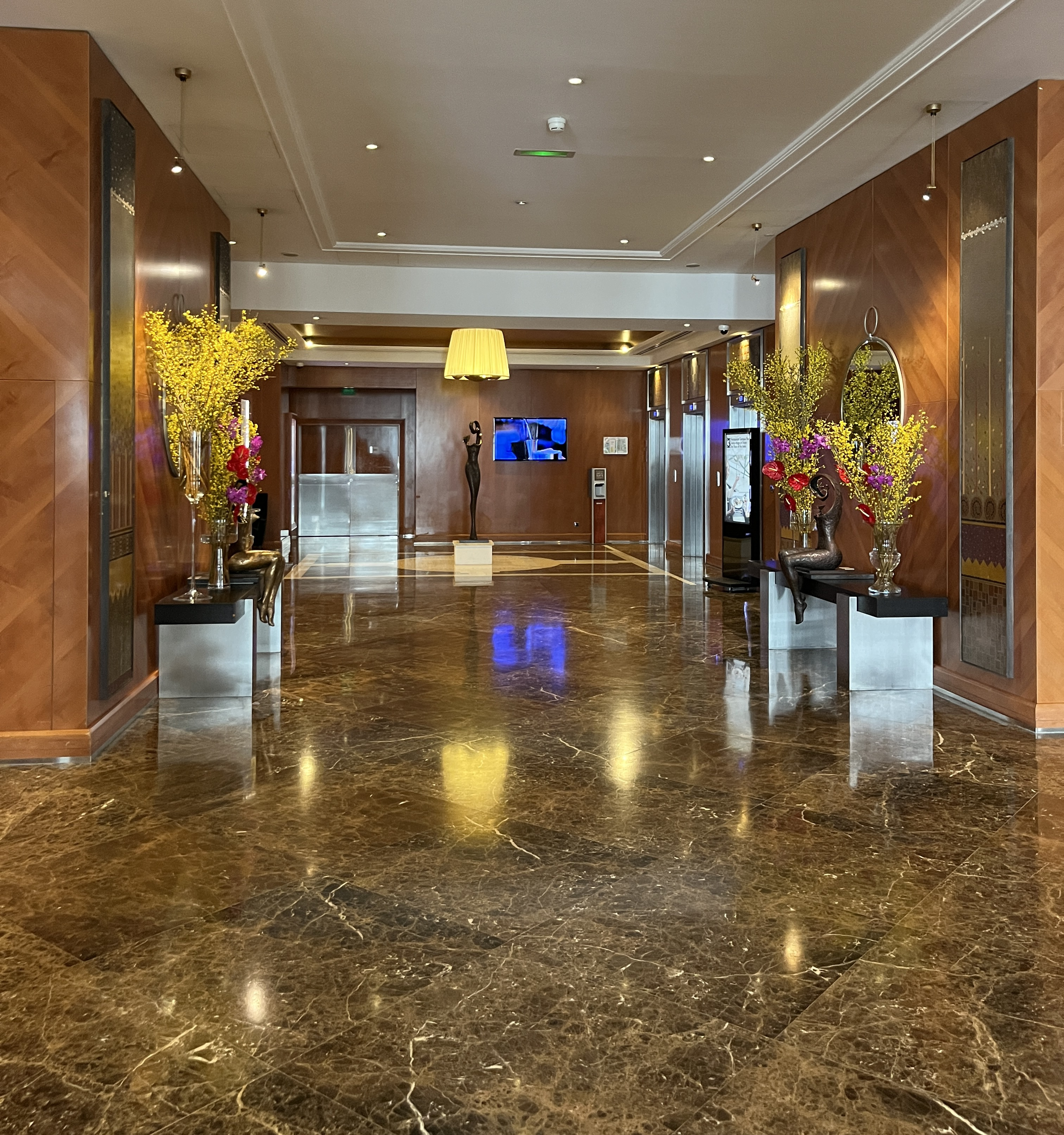
Hotel entrance hall

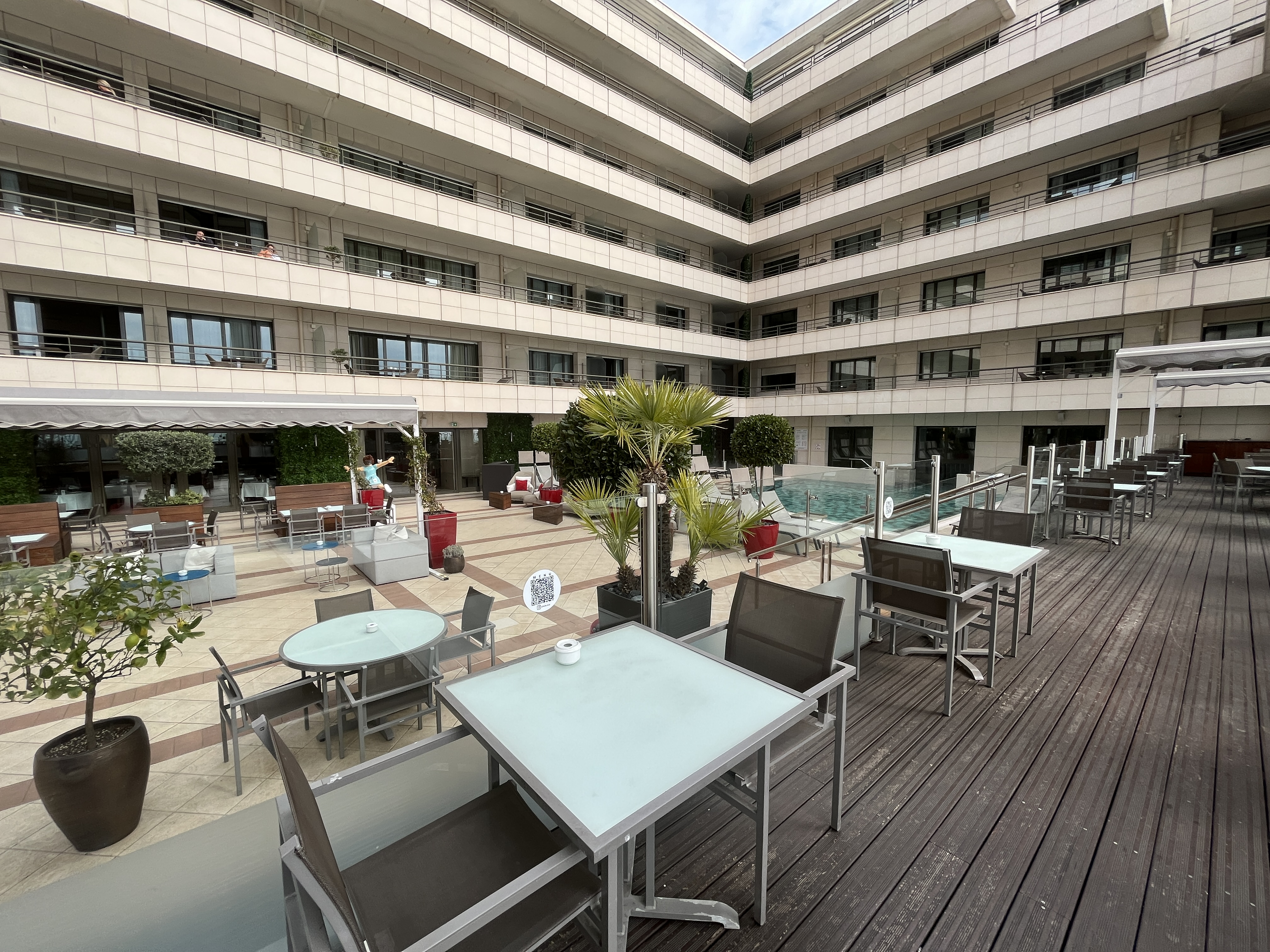
Terraces overlooking the pool

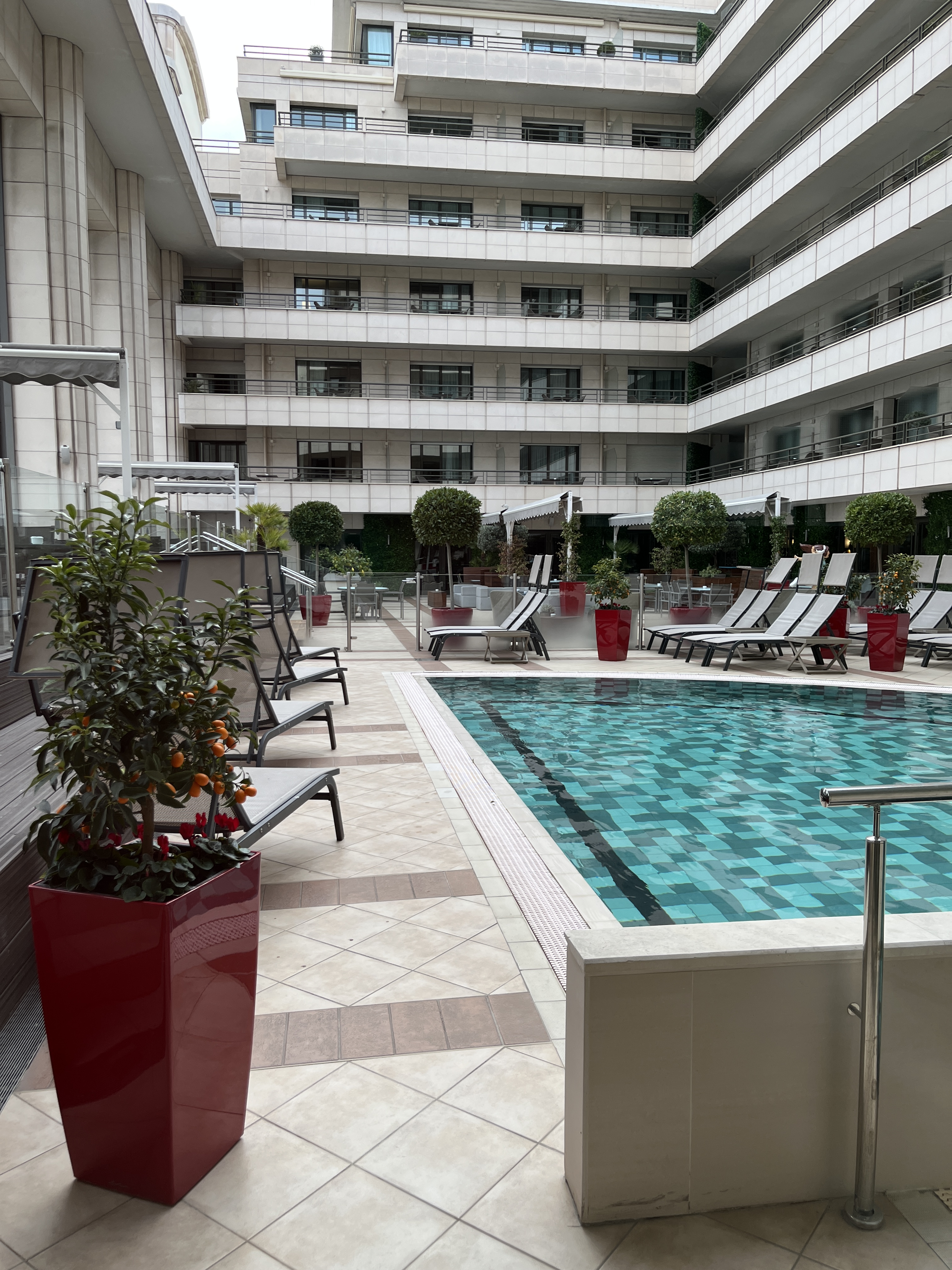
Pool

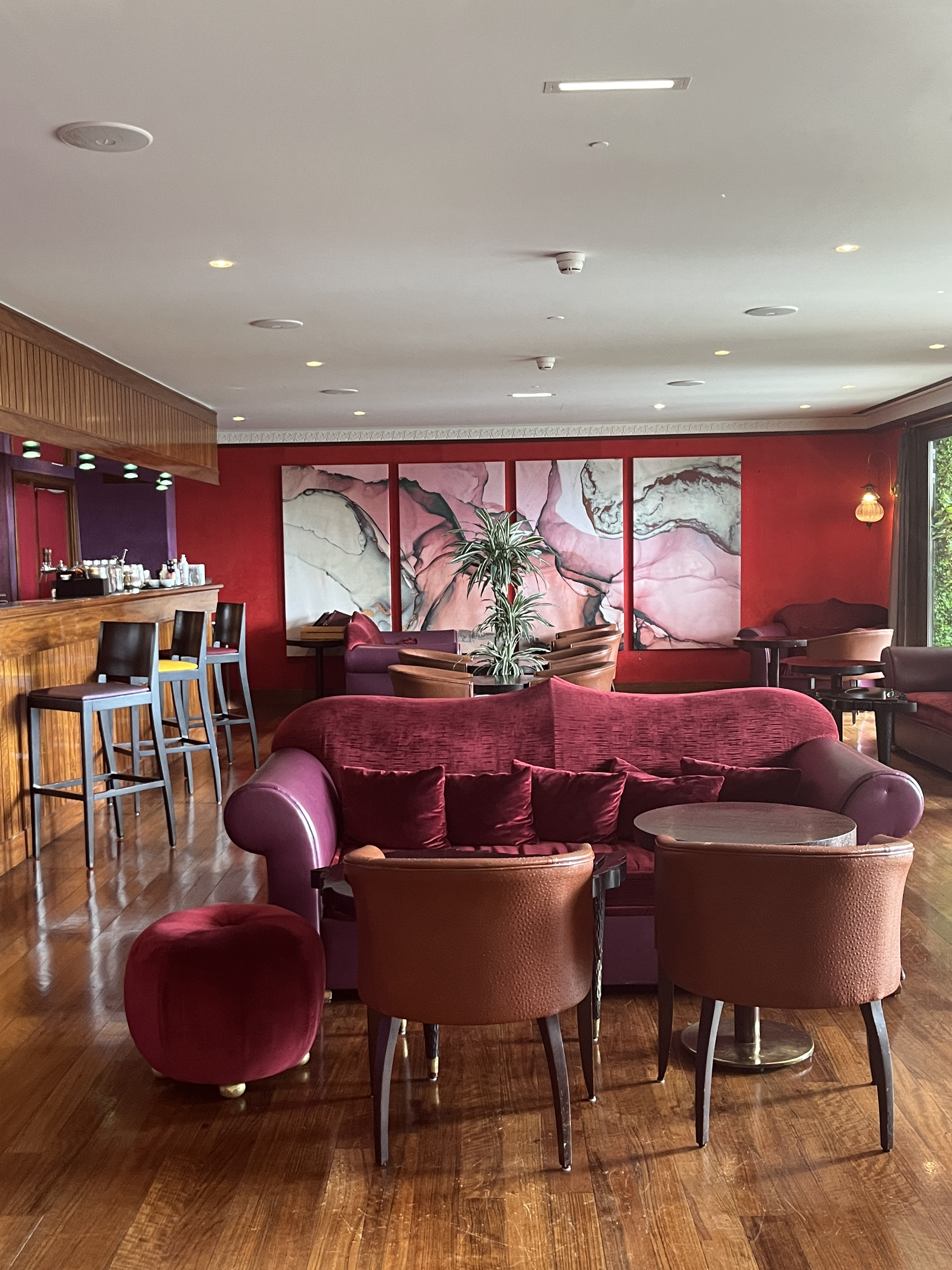
Bar

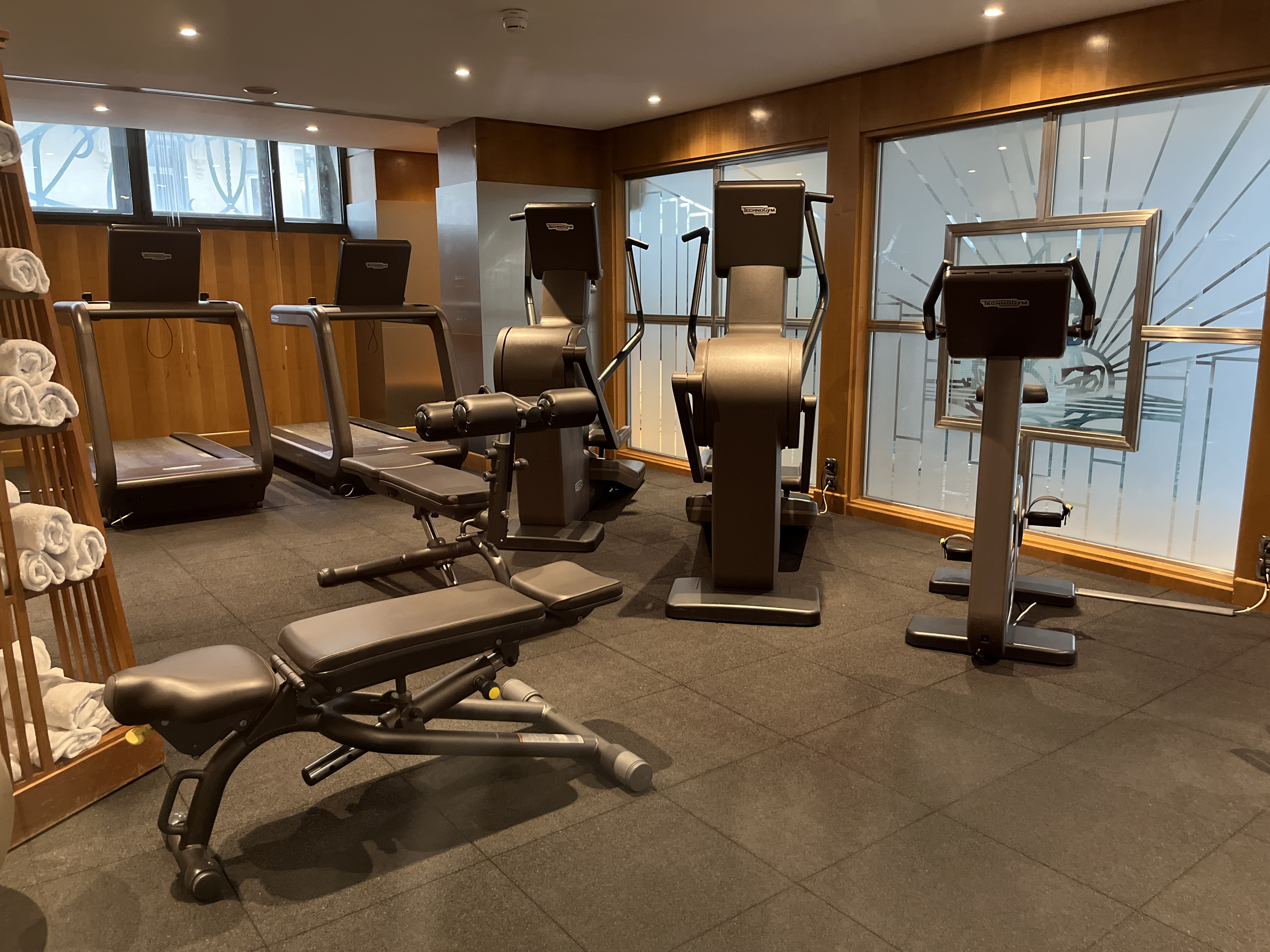
Gym

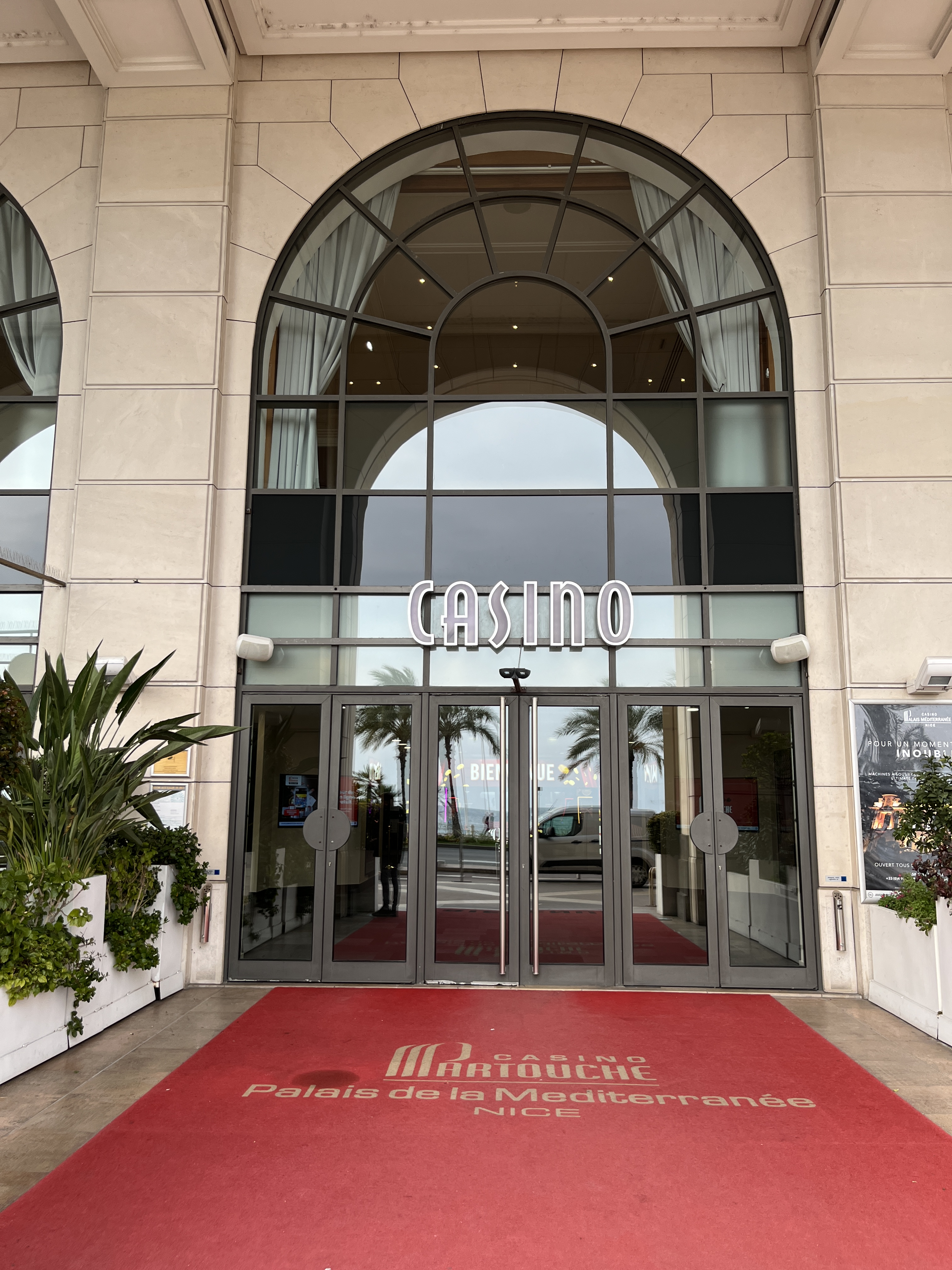
Casino entrance

== Bibliography ==
- Auzias, Dominique; Labourdette, Jean-Paul (24 July 2014). Best of French Riviera 2014 Petit Futé. Petit Futé. ISBN 978-2-7469-7599-6.
- Bovis-Aimar, Nadine, Le Palais de la Méditerranée, un défi des Années folles, pp. 4–13, Nice-Historique, Nice, 1993, issue 51 Texte]
- Costa, Valérie Da (2006). Germaine Richier: un art entre deux mondes (in French). Editions Norma. ISBN 978-2-915542-01-1.
- Dolff-Bonekämper, Gabriele (2004). Dividing Lines, Connecting Lines: Europe's Cross-border Heritage. Council of Europe Pub. ISBN 978-92-871-5546-7.
- Jianu, Ionel; Xuriguera, Gérard; Lardera, Aube (1982). La sculpture moderne en France depuis 1950 (in French). Arted Editions d'art.
