= List of largest rough diamonds =

This is a partial list of the largest non-synthetic diamonds with a rough stone (uncut) weight of over 200 carats (40 grams). The list is not intended to be complete—e.g., the Cullinan (formerly Premier) mine alone has produced 140 diamonds larger than 200 carats since mining commenced. De Beers generally does not publish information relating to large diamond discoveries.

Carats	Name	Country	Mine	Date	Current owner
3,245	Sergio (carbonado)	Brazil	Possibly from outer space. Found above ground in Lençóis	1895	Eventually sold to I.K. Gulland of London, where it was broken up into small pieces as industrial diamond drills.
3,106.75	Cullinan Diamond	South Africa	Premier Mine	1905	British Crown (I and II) and Charles III (III–IX). The largest gem-quality diamond ever discovered.
2,492	Motswedi	Botswana	Karowe Mine, Lucara Diamond Corp.	2024	Lucara Diamond
2,036		Botswana	Karowe Mine, Lucara Diamond Corp.	2025	Lucara Diamond
1,758	Sewelô	Botswana	Karowe Mine, Lucara Diamond Corp.	2019	Louis Vuitton
1,476		Botswana	Karowe Mine, Lucara Diamond Corp.	2025	Lucara Diamond
1,174		Botswana	Karowe Mine, Lucara Diamond Corp.	2021	Lucara Diamond
1,111	Lesedi La Rona	Botswana	Karowe Mine, Lucara Diamond Corp.	2015	Graff Diamonds
1,098		Botswana	Jwaneng Mine	2021	Debswana
1,094	Seriti	Botswana	Karowe Mine, Lucara Diamond Corp.	2024	Lucara Diamond
1,080	Eva Star	Botswana	Karowe Mine, Lucara Diamond Corp.	2023	
1,019.85		Botswana	Karowe Mine, Lucara Diamond Corp.	2025	Lucara Diamond
998		Botswana	Karowe Mine, Lucara Diamond Corp.	2020	
995.2	Excelsior Diamond	South Africa	Jagersfontein Mine	1893	Robert Mouawad
968.9	Star of Sierra Leone	Sierra Leone	Diminco Mine	1973	Harry Winston
910	Lesotho Legend	Lesotho	Letseng Mine	2018	Samir Gems and Taché Diamonds
890	Incomparable Diamond	Democratic Republic of the Congo	Societé Minière de Bakwanga	1984	Louis Glick
862		Botswana	Karowe Mine, Lucara Diamond Corp.	2023	
813	The Constellation	Botswana	Karowe Mine, Lucara Diamond Corp.	2015	Nemesis International DMCC
793	Koh-i-Noor	India	Kollur Mine	13th Century	British Crown
780	Great Mogul Diamond	India		around 1650	
777	Millennium Star	Democratic Republic of the Congo	Mbuji-Mayi	1990	De Beers
770	The Woyie River	Sierra Leone	Woyie River	1945	
755.5	The Golden Jubilee	South Africa	Premier Mine	1985	Government of Thailand
726.6	The Vargas	Brazil	San Antonio River	1938	
726	The Jonker	South Africa	Elandsfontein	1934	
709	Peace Diamond	Sierra Leone	Artisanal mine	2017	Graff Diamonds (bought for US$6.5 m)
692.3		Botswana	Karowe Mine, Lucara Diamond Corp.	2023	Sold for US$13 m after polishing.
650.8	The Jubilee	South Africa	Jagersfontein Mine	1895	Robert Mouawad
620	The Sefadu	Sierra Leone	Diminco Mine	1970	Lazare Kaplan
616	The Kimberley Octahedron	South Africa	Dutoitspan Mine	1974	De Beers
603	Lesotho Promise	Lesotho	Letseng Mine	2006	Graff Diamonds
602	Santo Antônio	Brazil	Santo Antonio do Bonito River	1994	
601	Lesotho Brown	Lesotho	Letseng Mine	1967	
600	Goias	Brazil	Verissimo River	1906	
599	Centenary	South Africa	Premier Mine	1986	
587	Spirit of de Grisogono	Central African Republic			
581	Wynn	Brazil	Amazon River	2002	
552.74		Canada	Diavik Mine	2018	
550	Letseng Star	Lesotho	Letseng Mine	2011	
549	Sethunya	Botswana	Karowe Mine, Lucara Diamond Corp.	2020	Lucara Diamond
507	Cullinan Heritage	South Africa	Cullinan Diamond Mine (fmr. Premier Mine)	2009	Chow Tai Fook Jewellery
493.24	Letseng Legacy	Lesotho	Letseng Mine	2007	SAFDICO (Graff Jewellers)
490	The Kimberley	South Africa	Kimberley Mine	1921	
478	Light of Letseng	Lesotho	Letseng Mine	2008	
476.7	Meya Prosperity	Sierra Leone	Meya Mine	2017	Graff Diamonds
472.37		Botswana	Karowe Mine, Lucara Diamond Corp.	2018	Top light brown. Sold June 2018
470		Botswana	Karowe Mine, Lucara Diamond Corp.	2021	Top light brown.
468.3	80th Anniversary of Victory in the Great Patriotic War	Russia / Soviet Union	Mir mine	2025	Alrosa; amber-coloured.
460.2		South Africa	Cullinan Diamond Mine (fmr. Premier Mine)	2009	
460	Darcy Vargas	Brazil	Santo Antonio do Bonito River	1939	
460	Charneca 1	Brazil	Santo Ignacio River	1940	
439	Letseng Icon	Lesotho	Letseng Mine	2020	Samir Gems and Taché diamonds
434.6	Zale Light of Peace	Sierra Leone		1969	Sold in 1980 to unknown buyer
428.5	The De Beers	South Africa	De Beers Mine	1888	Disappeared
424.89	The Legacy of the Cullinan Diamond Mine	South Africa	Cullinan Mine	2019	Choron Group
410	The Regent	India	Paritala-Kollur Mine	1698	Louvre Museum, France
404.2	4 de Fevereiro	Angola	Lulo Diamond Project	2016	De Grisogono
401.97		Russia / Soviet Union		2016	Sold by Alrosa and JSC Almazy Anabara to Taché Diamonds and Samir Gems
378		Botswana	Karowe Mine, Lucara Diamond Corp.	2021	
393.5		Botswana	Karowe Mine, Lucara Diamond Corp.	2021	
391.45		Sierra Leone	Meya Mine	2024	
373		Botswana	Karowe Mine, Lucara Diamond Corp.	2015	Graff Diamonds
367	Letseng Princess	Lesotho	Letseng Mine	2021	Samir Gems and Taché diamonds
357.61		Lesotho	Letseng Mine	2018	Light brown
357	Letseng Dynasty	Lesotho	Letseng Mine	2015	
353.9	Premier Rose	South Africa	Premier Mine	1978	Robert Mouawad
347		Botswana	Karowe Mine, Lucara Diamond Corp.	2016	
342.92		South Africa	Cullinan Mine	2021	
342.57	26th Congress of the CPSU	Russia / Soviet Union	Mir mine	1980	Diamond Fund, Moscow
341.9	Queen of Kalahari	Botswana	Karowe Mine, Lucara Diamond Corp.	2015	Bought by Chopard in partnership with Taché Diamonds and Samir Gems
341		Botswana	Karowe Mine, Lucara Diamond Corp.	2021	
327.48		Botswana	Karowe Mine, Lucara Diamond Corp.	2018	Sold for US$10.1 m in June 2018
320.65	Alexander Pushkin	Russia / Soviet Union	Udachnaya pipe	1989	Diamond Fund, Moscow
300.12	Gruosi Diamond	India			
300 (?)	The Orlov	India		~1750	Diamond Fund, Moscow
299		South Africa	Cullinan Mine	2021	Sold to Stargems DMCC in March 2021 for US$12.18 m
298.48	The Creator	Russia / Soviet Union	Placer mining, Yakutia	2004	Government of the Sakha Republic; kept in the Diamond Fund, Moscow
296.66		Botswana	Karowe Mine, Lucara Diamond Corp.	2016	
295.8		South Africa	Cullinan Mine	2021	Sold to Stargems DMCC for US$13.9 m
295		Lesotho	Letseng Mine	2024	
287.42	Tiffany Yellow Diamond	South Africa	Premier Mine	1877	Tiffany & Co.
280		South Africa	Jagersfontein Mine	1902	
271		Canada	Victor Mine	2018	De Beers
269.7		Botswana	Karowe Mine, Lucara Diamond Corp.	2015	
267.53	Unnamed	Brazil	Pontesinha diamond bed	Unknown	
256.6		Botswana	Karowe Mine, Lucara Diamond Corp.	2013	
254.5	Star of the South	Brazil	Bagagem River	1853	Last known at Cartier, 2002
254		Lesotho	Letseng Mine	2021	
253.7	The Oppenheimer	South Africa	Dutoitspan Mine	1964	Smithsonian Institution
249.89		Botswana	Karowe Mine, Lucara Diamond Corp.	2017	
248.9		South Africa	Jagersfontein Mine	1967	
246		Lesotho	Letseng Mine	2021	Samir Gems and Taché diamonds
245.42		Botswana	Karowe Mine, Lucara Diamond Corp.	2016	
245		Lesotho	Letseng Mine	2022	Samir Gems and Taché diamonds
242	The Manami Star	Botswana	Jwaneng Mine	2018?	Cut into an 88.22 carat diamond; auctioned in Hong Kong by Sothebys and sold for US$13.8 m to a Japanese collector.
241.8	Free Russia	Russia / Soviet Union	Sytykanskaya pipe	1991	Diamond Fund, Moscow
240.8	The Taylor Burton	South Africa	Premier Mine	1966	
240		Botswana	Karowe Mine, Lucara Diamond Corp.	2019	
239		Botswana	Karowe Mine, Lucara Diamond Corp.	2013	
236.25	Dawn (Anabar)	Russia / Soviet Union	Ebelyakh diamond mine	2020	Alrosa, Moscow. Brown/yellow diamond.
235.17	The Town of Vilyuysk	Russia / Soviet Union	Yubileynaya mine	2013	
235		Angola	Lulo Mine	2023	
233		Lesotho	Letseng Mine	2020	
232.4		Russia / Soviet Union	Udachnaya Mine	2019	
232.1		South Africa	Cullinan Mine	2014	
232.05	Star of Yakutia	Russia / Soviet Union	Mir mine	1973	Diamond Fund, Moscow
227		Angola	Lulo Mine	2017	Lucapa Diamond
224.47		Botswana	Karowe Mine, Lucara Diamond Corp.	2016	
223		Botswana	Karowe Mine, Lucara Diamond Corp.	2019	
222.09	Vladimir Grib	Russia / Soviet Union	Grib diamond mine	2019	
221.47	Manhattan Lycos White	South Africa	Manhattan Diamonds	2012	
217.39	The Angola Star	Angola	Luarica Mine	2007	Diamond in the Rough, New York City
216.96		Botswana	Karowe Mine, Lucara Diamond Corp.	2017	
215		Lesotho	Mothae Mine	2021	
214.65	Boris Eifman	Russia / Soviet Union	Nyurbinskoye mine	2016	Alrosa
212.53	Lev Rovnin	Russia / Soviet Union	Grib diamond mine	2019	
212.49		Lesotho	Letseng Mine	2024	
210.55	Premier	Russia / Soviet Union	Mir mine	1991	Diamond Fund, Moscow
208		Angola	Lulo Mine	2023	
207.29	Diaghilev (Children of Asia)	Russia / Soviet Union	Zarnitsa mine	2016	Alrosa
203		Angola	Lulo Mine	2024	
202		Lesotho	Letseng Mine	2017	Bought by Taché Diamonds & Samir Gems
200.74	60th anniversary of the Komsomol	Russia / Soviet Union	Mir mine	1978	Diamond Fund, Moscow

== See also ==
- List of diamonds
- List of emeralds by size
- List of individual gemstones
- List of gold nuggets by size
- List of sapphires by size
