= Korloff Noir =

Black diamond

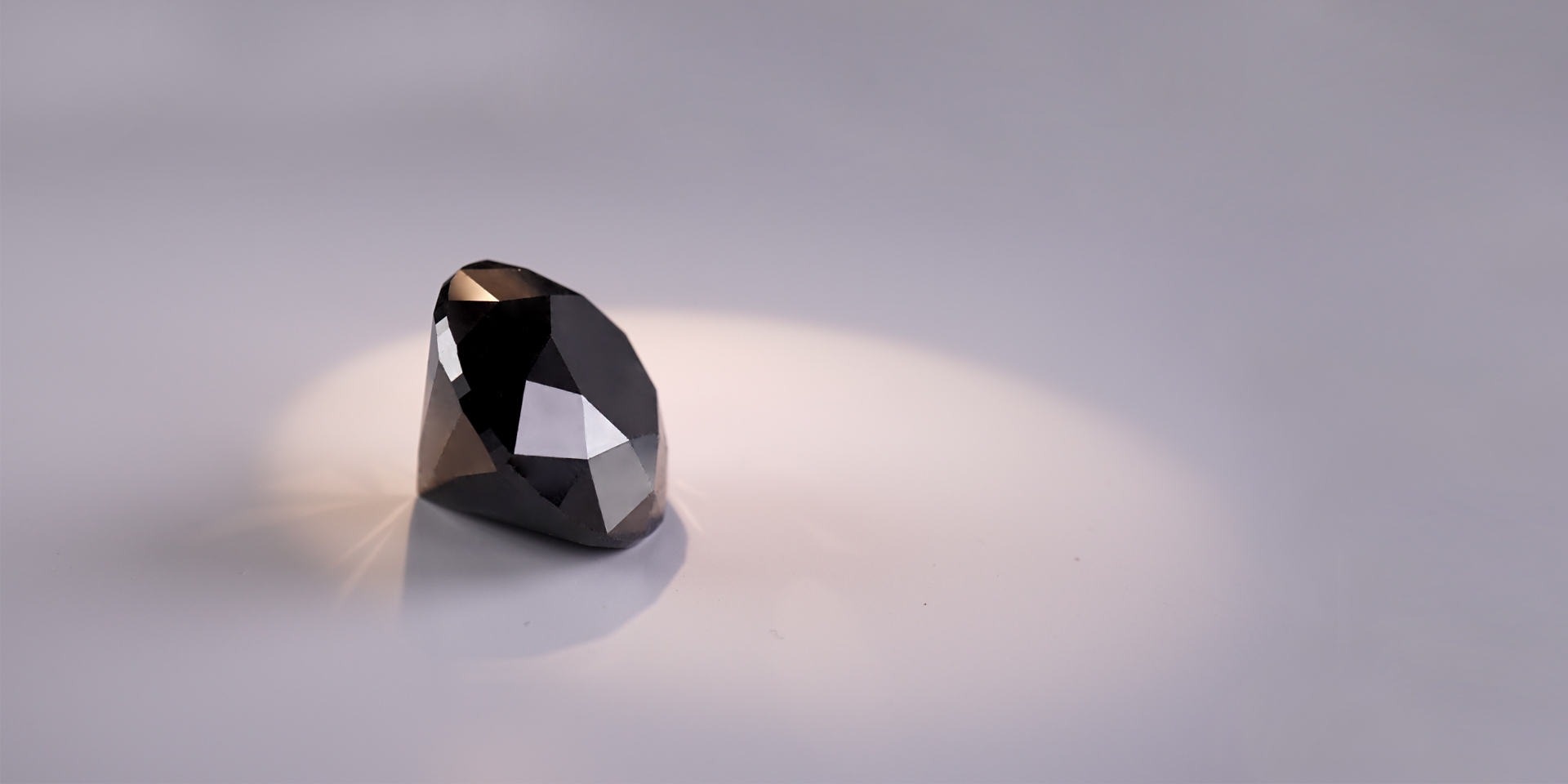
Korloff Noir diamond.

The Korloff Noir is one of the world's largest known black diamonds. It is an 88-carat diamond, with 57 edges. Before it was cut and polished, it had 421 carats. It is named for the Korloff-Sapojnikoff family, members of the Russian nobility, who once owned it. In 1978, Daniel Paillasseur, a French jeweller, purchased it. The Korloff Noir is currently owned by the Korloff Company, which was founded by Paillasseur. It is insured for $37 million.

== See also ==
- Black Falcon Diamond - the world's largest cut diamond
- Spirit of de Grisogono Diamond - third worlds largest
- Amsterdam Diamond, another famous cut black diamond
- List of diamonds
