= The Creator (diamond) =

Large diamond found in Russia in 2004

- Weight: 298.48 carats (59.696 g)
- Color: Colored
- Cut: Raw
- Country of origin: Russia
- Mine of origin: Placer mining, Sakha Republic, Russia
- Discovered: 2004
- Original owner: Government of the Sakha Republic, Russia
- Owner: Government of the Sakha Republic, Russia; kept in Russia's Diamond Fund, Moscow Kremlin
- Estimated value: 20 million $sale.

The Creator (Russian: Творе́ц, IPA: [tvɐˈrʲet͡s]; lit. 'Creator') is a 298.48 carat colored raw diamond, the third largest gem diamond ever found in Russia or the territory of the former Soviet Union (after the 26th Congress of the CPSU and the Alexander Pushkin), and one of the largest in the world as of 2016. It was found at a placer mining factory in the area of the Lower Lena River (Yakutia, Far Eastern Federal District) in 2004 and is owned by the Government of the Sakha Republic, but kept in the Russian Diamond Fund (Moscow Kremlin).

== See also ==
- List of diamonds
- List of largest rough diamonds
