= Vargas Diamond =

- Weight: 726 carats (145.2 g)
- Discovered: 1938
- Cut by: Adrian Graselly

The Vargas Diamond, discovered in the bed of the Rio Santo Antonio in Brazil on August 13, 1938 (July 1938 according to Ball & Kerr) by Joaquim Venancio Tiago and Manoel Miguel Domingues. It was 726.6 carats (145.32 g) when pulled out of the ground.

The diamond has been in the possession of Harry Winston, a jeweler from New York, who purchased it for $700,000. It was the largest known uncut diamond in the world, but since there was no market for a diamond of this size, it was cut into 23 pieces, including the 48.26-carat (9.652 g) emerald cut diamond named "President Vargas", after the former Brazilian president, Getúlio Vargas. The cutting of the stone was operated in 1941 in Winston's NY Fifth Avenue atelier. 15 months were required. Though 50% of the stone became dust during the cutting, the sales value of the stones reached $2 million. The stone was cut by Adrian Grasselly.

== See also ==
- List of largest rough diamonds
- List of diamonds
- Cullinan Diamond
- Excelsior Diamond
