= The Enigma (diamond) =

Black diamond

The Enigma

The Enigma is one of the world's largest cut diamonds, containing 55 facets and weighing 555.55 carats (111.11 grams). It is a semi-transparent carbonado with a dark brown/black color. Carbonados are often reserved for industrial uses. Larger specimens become collectors' stones; most gem-quality stones used in contemporary jewelry design have been treated to produce the black color. A natural black diamond of this size is extremely rare.

The diamond's origin is uncertain. Sotheby's claims—that it may originate from a meteor or an asteroid that struck Earth—are disputed. Its cutting was commissioned by and designed with input from Belgian gem expert Ran Gorenstein, president of the international fintech company Diamond Data Derivatives, and completed in June 2004 after several years of cutting and faceting. The repetitive use of the number five in the gem's design is derived from the hamsa, a palm-shaped amulet popular in the Middle East and North Africa.

Cryptocurrency promoter Richard Heart purchased the Enigma at Sotheby's in February 2022 with $4.3 million in cryptocurrency. The SEC alleged that the funds for Heart's acquisition of the diamond came from misappropriated investor funds; the legal proceeding in which the SEC made this claim was dismissed by U.S. District Judge Carol Bagley Amon in February 2025. When Heart was arrested in October 2026 on Finnish fraud charges, authorities seized jewelry and valuables but did not specify whether the Enigma was among them.

== See also ==
- List of diamonds
- Black Falcon Diamond
