= The Jonker =

Large South African diamond

- Weight: 726 carats (145.2 g)
- Color: D-flawless
- Country of origin: South Africa
- Mine of origin: Elandsfontein
- Discovered: 17 January 1934
- Cut by: Lazare Kaplan
- Original owner: Ernest Oppenheimer
- Owner: Anonymous
- Estimated value: $2.25M+

The Jonker diamond was found at the Elandsfontein mine in South Africa by Johannes Jacobus Jonker on 17 January 1934. The diamond was 726 carats, which at the time was the fourth largest uncut gem ever found.

== Ownership ==
The diamond was first purchased by Joseph Bastiaenen, an agent of the Diamond Corporation Ltd, a company owned by Sir Ernest Oppenheimer. In 1935 it was purchased by Harry Winston, a New York diamond dealer, for 150,000 pounds. Harry Winston toured the United States with the diamond that was photographed with a number of stars such as Claudette Colbert and Shirley Temple.

== Cut ==
After contemplating the diamond for almost a year, Winston chose Lazare Kaplan to study the Jonker diamond.

Lazare Kaplan was chosen to cut the diamond into several gemstones. The process of examining the diamond to determine the optimal cuts took place over the course of several months. On 27 April 1936, the first cut was made which cut off a 35-carat section, finally ending with the diamond being cut into 13 pieces. The largest piece produced the Jonker I, a 142.90 ct D-color flawless diamond which was later re-cut to 125.35 carats.

Name	Cut Type	Cut Weight (ct)	Finished Weight (ct)
Jonker I	Emerald	220	142.90
Jonker II	Emerald	79.65	41.29
Jonker III	Emerald	65.28	35.45
Jonker IV	Emerald	52.77	30.71
Jonker V	Emerald	54.19	25.78
Jonker VI	Emerald	53.95	24.91
Jonker VII	Emerald	43.30	19.76
Jonker VIII	Marquise	35.82	15.77
Jonker IX	Emerald	27.85	13.55
Jonker X	Emerald	29.46	11.43
Jonker XI	Emerald	13.57	5.70
Jonker XII	Emerald	10.98	5.30
Jonker XIII	Baguette	8.28	3.53

== Jonker I ==
In 1949, King Farouk of Egypt purchased the Jonker I. After he was deposed and exiled in 1952, the gem was lost. The gem later reappeared in the ownership of Queen Ratna of Nepal. Until 2023, the last known location of the Jonker I was Hong Kong in 1977, when it was sold to an anonymous buyer for $2,259,000.

It was included in a public exhibition at the Natural History Museum of Los Angeles County in 2023/2024.

== See also ==
- List of diamonds
- List of largest rough diamonds
