= Woyie River diamond =

- Weight: 770 carats (154 g)
- Color: D-flawless
- Country of origin: Sierra Leone
- Discovered: 1945

The Woyie River diamond was recovered on 6 January 1945 from the Woyie River near Koidu in eastern Sierra Leone. The uncut stone weighed 770 carats (154 g), and at that time it was the largest alluvial diamond ever found, and the third largest diamond discovered in Africa, after the Cullinan Diamond and the Excelsior Diamond. The Star of Sierra Leone, a larger alluvial diamond weighing 968.9 carats (193.78 g) in its rough state, was discovered on 14 February 1972 at the Diminco mining operation in Sierra Leone.

The uncut Woyie River diamond had a broadly lozenge shape, measuring 71 × 53 × 32 millimetres (2.8 × 2.1 × 1.3 in), with one unusually flat cleavage plane. The rough diamond was brought to London, where it was viewed by Queen Mary in October 1947 and then exhibited at the British Industries Fair in May 1949. In 1953, the stone was cut by the London diamond-cutting firm Briefel and Lemer (who also cut the Williamson pink diamond) into 30 gems weighing 282.36 carats (56.472 g) in total, including 10 of over 20 carats (4.0 g) each. The largest of the resulting gems was named the Victory Diamond, a rectangular step-cut diamond named in commemoration of the Allied victory in World War II. Sotheby's catalogued the diamond at 31.34 carats (6.268 g) in 2014.

== Victory Diamond ==
A 2014 grading report from the Gemological Institute of America (GIA) classified the Victory Diamond as D colour and VVS2 clarity. A supplementary classification identified it as a Type IIa diamond. The gemstone was acquired by Frank Jay Gould, son of railroad tycoon Jay Gould, for his third wife Florence (née La Caze). Following her death in 1983, the diamond was sold at Christie's in New York on 11 April 1984 as part of the Florence J. Gould collection. It was offered at Sotheby's in Geneva in May 2014 but remained unsold and was up for sale at Sotheby's in New York in 2015 but never sold. It was subsequently sold that same year by Christie's for $4,309,000.

== See also ==
- List of diamonds
- List of largest rough diamonds
