= The Sefadu =

- Weight: 620 carats (124 g)
- Cut: Uncut
- Country of origin: Sierra Leone
- Mine of origin: Diminco Mine
- Discovered: 1970
- Owner: Lazare Kaplan

The Sefadu diamond was found in the town of Sefadu in Sierra Leone in 1970. The diamond is 620 carats making it the seventh largest diamond ever found and the largest still uncut diamond in the world.

== See also ==
- List of diamonds
- List of largest rough diamonds
