= De Grisogono =

Swiss luxury jeweller

de Grisogono
- Type: Privately held company
- Industry: Jewellery manufacturing
- Founded: 1993 by Fawaz Gruosi
- Headquarters: Geneva, Switzerland
- Products: jewellery, watches
- Revenue: ▲€102.6 million (2011)
- Parent: De Grisogono

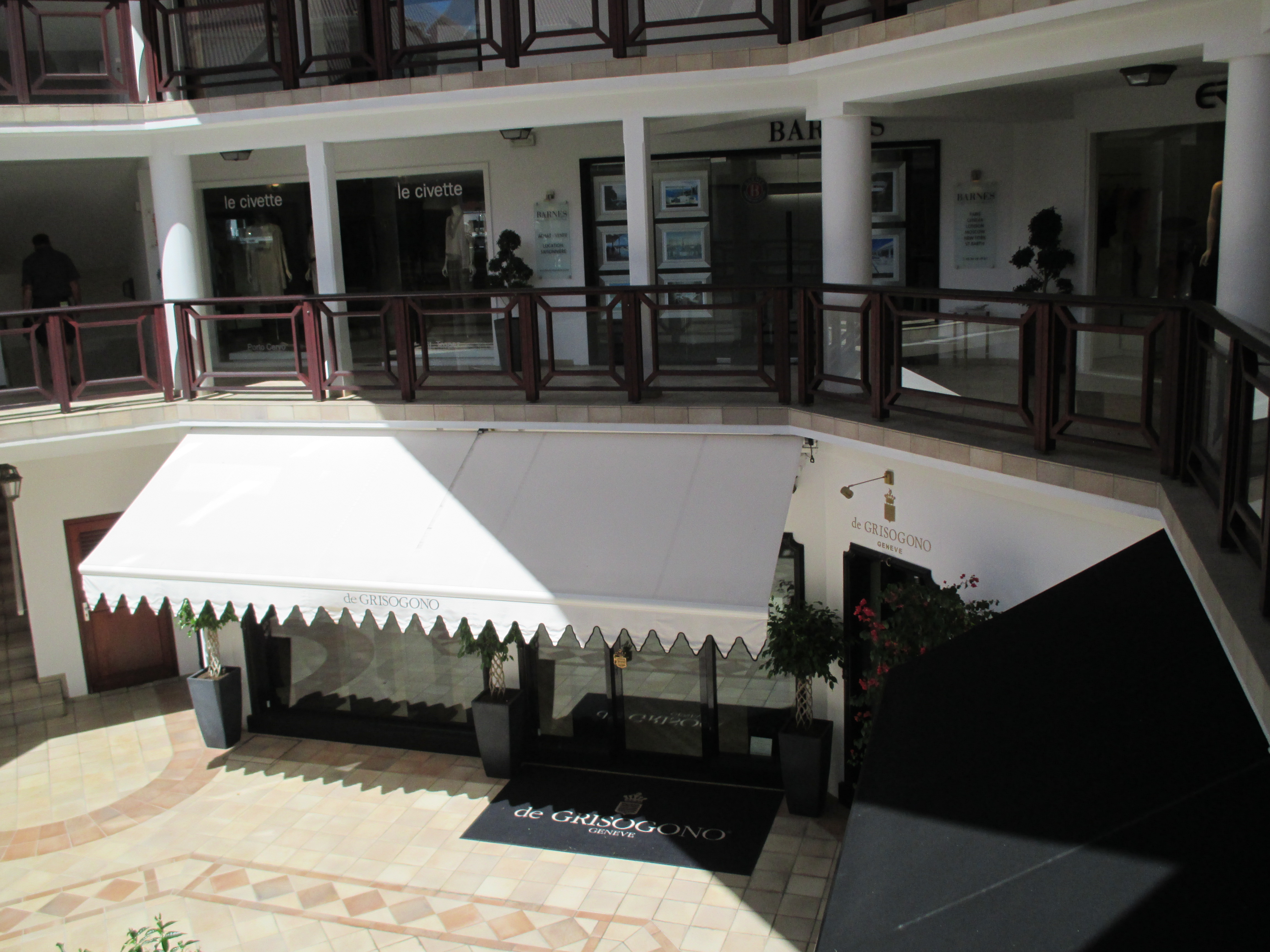
De Grisogono shop in Gustavia, Saint-Barthélemy (France)

De Grisogono is a Swiss luxury jeweller founded in Geneva, Switzerland, in 1993 by Lebanese-Italian black diamond specialist Fawaz Gruosi. The Italian name Grisogono is derived from the Latin Chrysogonus which comes from the Greek Chrysogonos χρῡσό-γονος, meaning "begotten of gold". The company filed for bankruptcy on 29 January 2020. In 2022 it was bought by the Damac Group of Dubai.

== History ==
In 2012, De Grisogono majority shareholder Fawaz Gruosi sold his majority stake to SODIAM (trading arm of the Angolan state diamond company), a company partially controlled by the José Eduardo dos Santos family.

In 2017, De Grisogono entered into a new partnership with former Leviev executives David and Lisa Klein.

"Creation I," a necklace by de Grisogono, was sold for nearly Dh125 million, in 2017's Christie's sale.

In 2017, the company set a new record at Christie's Magnificent Jewels sale in Geneva when it sold the world's biggest-ever emerald cut diamond offered at auction. The 163.41-carat D Flawless stone, which was cut from a 404 carat rough, was incorporated into a necklace designed by Fawaz Gruosi. It fetched 33.5 million Swiss francs, beating the previous record for a D Flawless diamond by nearly five million Swiss francs.

In January 2019, Fawaz Gruosi supposedly left the company's board and his role as chief designer of De Grisogono. Céline Assimon was named CEO. On 29 January 2020, de Grisogono filed for bankruptcy. In 2022 it was bought by the Damac Group of Dubai. In August 2024, SODIAM sold its remaining shares in De Grisogono in a move to dismantle dos Santos' financial empire.

== Dos Santos controversy ==
In 2012, De Grisogono majority shareholder Fawaz Gruosi sold his shares to investors centered around Isabel dos Santos, daughter of José Eduardo dos Santos. The dos Santos family had bought the company to create a vertical diamond distribution chain Angola-Switzerland, and made SODIAM (trading arm of the Angolan state diamond company) invest $120 million in De Grisogono. The investment apparently had no impact on the company's finances, and bonuses paid to the dos Santos family were funneled through shell companies in Malta and the British Virgin Islands, where Victoria Holding Limited served as intermediary owner of De Grisogono.

In January 2020 De Grisogono was named in the Luanda Leaks investigation by the International Consortium of Investigative Journalists as being part of the business empire of Angola's Isabel dos Santos.

== See also ==
- List of watch manufacturers
- Spirit of de Grisogono Diamond
