= Alexander Pushkin (diamond) =

2nd largest diamond found in Russia or the territory of the former USSR, as of 2016

- Weight: 320.65 carats (64.130 g)
- Color: Colorless
- Country of origin: Soviet Union
- Mine of origin: Udachnaya pipe
- Discovered: 1989
- Cut by: Raw
- Original owner: Government of the Soviet Union
- Owner: Diamond Fund, Moscow Kremlin
- Estimated value: Never put on sale

The Alexander Pushkin (Russian: Алекса́ндр Пу́шкин, IPA: [ɐlʲɪˈksandr ˈpuʂkʲɪn]; lit. 'Alexander Pushkin') is a 320.65 carat colorless raw diamond, the second largest gem diamond ever found in Russia or the territory of the former Soviet Union (after the 26th Congress of the CPSU), and one of the largest in the world as of 2016. It was mined at the Udachnaya kimberlitic pipe (Yakutia, Far Eastern Federal District) in December 1989 and named after the world-famous Russian writer Alexander Pushkin. It is kept in the Russian Diamond Fund (Moscow Kremlin).

== See also ==
- List of diamonds
- List of largest rough diamonds
