= Internationalnaya diamond mine =

Russian diamond mine

Internationalnaya mine
- Location within Sakha Republic Location within Russia
- Location: Mirninsky District, Sakha Republic, Russia; 62°27′23″N 113°42′23″E
- Products: diamonds
- Type: open-pit then underground
- Discovered: 1969
- Opened: 1971
- Company: ALROSA

The Internationalnaya mine (Russian: Интернациона́льная, IPA: [ɪntɛrnət͡sɨɐˈnalʲnəɪ̯ə]; lit. 'International') is one of the largest diamond mines in Russia and in the world. The mine is located in the north-eastern part of the country in the Sakha Republic. The mine has estimated reserves of 61.9 million carats of diamonds and an annual production capacity of 5.9 million carats.

== See also ==
- List of mines in Russia
- Mir mine
