= Shah Diamond =

Indian gemstone

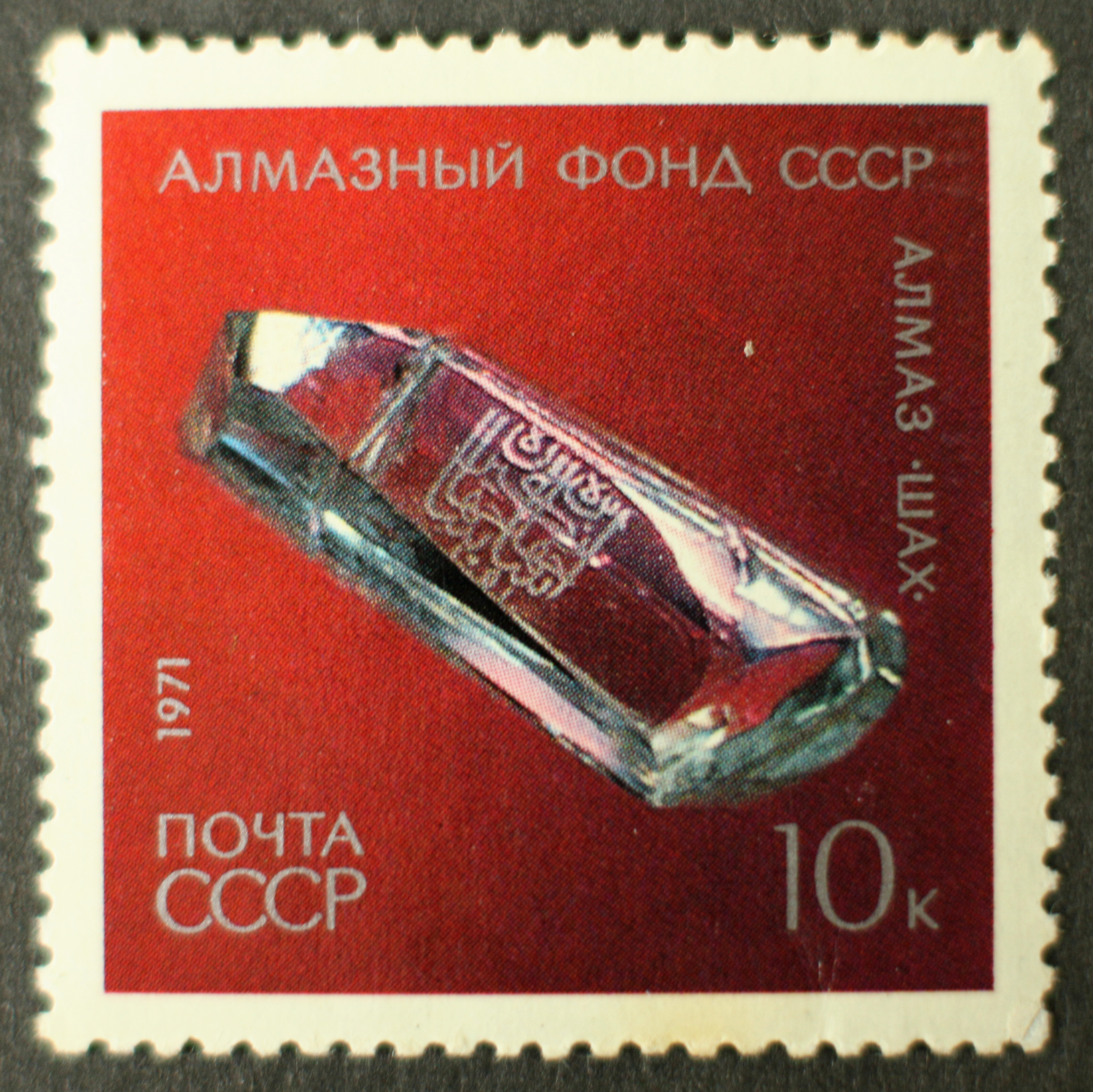
Shah Diamond, 1971 postage stamp

The Shah Diamond was found at the Golconda mines in what is now Telangana, South India, probably in 1450, and it is currently held in the Diamond Fund collection of Moscow's Kremlin Armoury.

== Physical description ==
The Shah Diamond is not of the first water, since it has a yellowish tinge due to a little iron oxide at the surface. It is said to have originally weighed 95 carat, and that it lost 9 carats when being cut. Its present weight is 88.7 carats (18 g). It is an elongated octahedron, the eight original faces of which have been replaced by fifteen facets. It is often described as the shape of a coffin. The cut of the diamond is technically called a lasque cut; typical of Indian diamonds. A groove has been cut round the stone to accommodate the thread by which it was formerly worn round the neck. Its most remarkable feature is that on three of its original faces the names of three of the rulers who owned it have been engraved in Persian, along with the Hijrī year. The names and dates of these three rulers are as follows:

- Nizām Shāh: 1000 (1591 CE).
- Jahān Shāh: 1051 (1641 CE).
- Fath 'Alī Shāh: 1242 (1826 CE).

It does not rank as one of the top diamonds of the world in beauty or size, but the inscriptions on it testify to its history and provenance.

== History ==
It was rendered to the Nizām Shāhī court in Ahmednagar. In 1591, Shāh Nizām ordered carving on one of the facets of the diamond: "Burhān Nizām Shāh the Second. Year 1000" (=1591 CE).

That same year, Akbar the Great, the Emperor of Mughal India occupied the Ahmadnagar Sultanate and seized the diamond. A number of years later Akbar's grandson, Shāh Jahān, came to the throne, and commanded that another inscription be carved: "Shāh Jahān, The son of Shāh Jehangir . Year 1051" (equivalent to 1641 CE). The son of Shah Jahān Aurangzēb hung the diamond above his throne and encircled it with rubies and emeralds. After visiting the court of Aurangzēb, the famous French jeweller Tavernier wrote: "On the side of the throne which is opposite the court there is to be seen a jewel consisting of a diamond of about 80 to 90 carats weight, with rubies and emeralds around it, and when the king is seated he has the jewel in full view." Because of its proximity to the throne, the diamond was also known as the "Throne Diamond". It was transferred to Lahore in 1715 and kept here until 1738.

In 1738, Nāder Shāh attacked India, seized the diamond, and took it back with him to Persia. The diamond stayed in Persia for nearly a century until, in 1826, the third inscription was engraved on the third facet: "The ruler of the Qājār Fath 'Alī Shāh Sultān. Year 1242".

In 1829, the Russian diplomat and writer Alexandr Griboyedov was murdered in the capital of Persia, Tehran. The Russian government demanded severe punishment of those responsible. In fear, the court of Fath 'Alī Shāh sent the Shāh's grandson Khusro Mirzā to Saint Petersburg, where he gave the diamond to the Russian Tsar Nicholas I as a present. It was then kept among the Russian Crown Jewels in the Diamond Room at the Winter Palace in St. Petersburg, until the Russian Revolution and the overthrow of the Romanov Dynasty on 2 March 1917. The diamond, along with the other treasures, was removed, taken to Moscow and placed in the Kremlin Diamond Fund. It remains there today in the Kremlin, where it is exhibited as one of the seven famous gems.

== See also ==
- List of diamonds
