= Sergio (carbonado) =

Largest known rough diamond

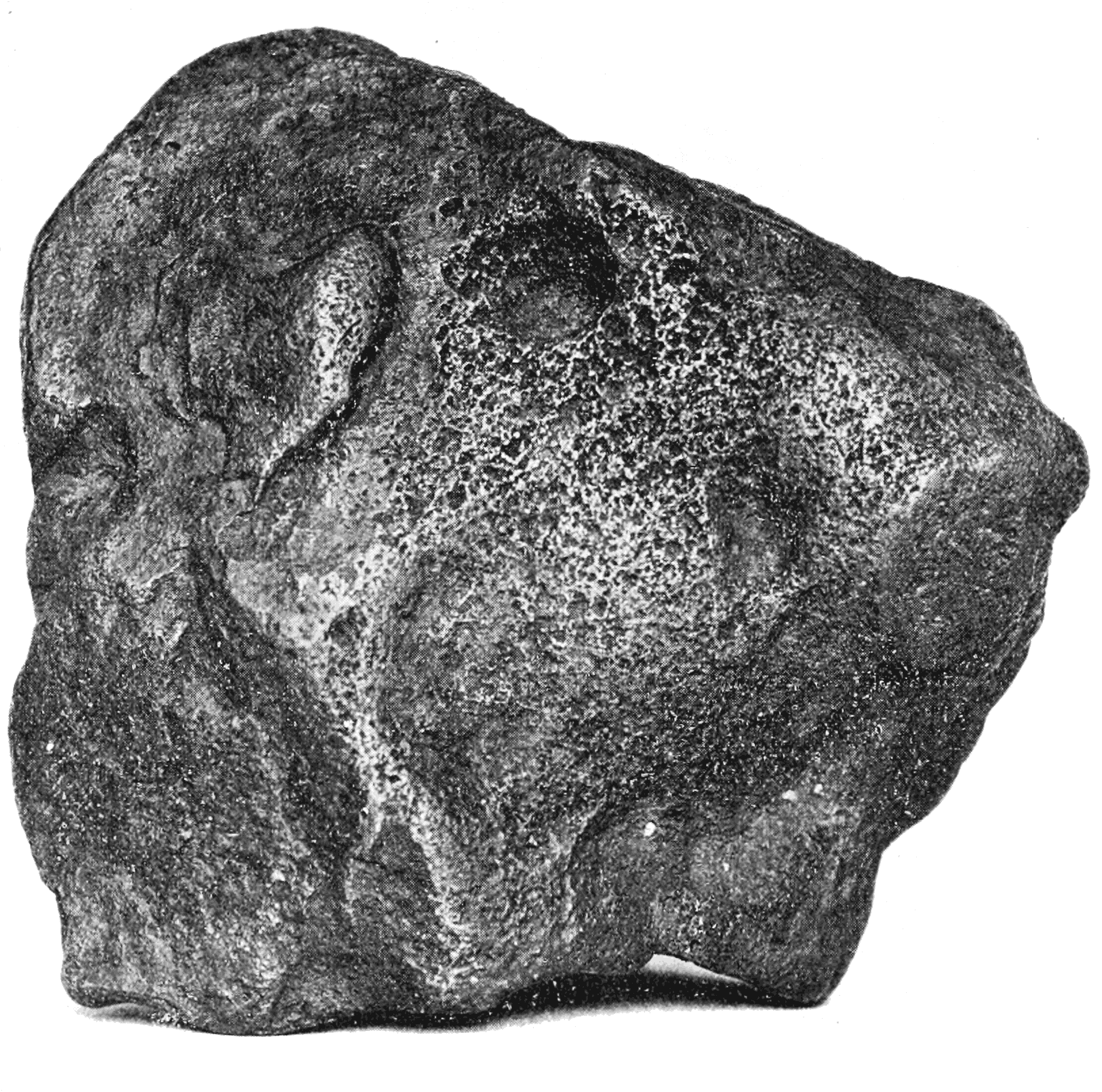
A 1906 Popular Science Monthly engraving of the Sergio

The Sergio (Portuguese: Carbonado do Sérgio) was the largest rough diamond discovered. It was found above ground in Lençóis (State of Bahia, Brazil) in 1895 by Sérgio Borges de Carvalho and weighed 3,245 carats.

The Sergio was first sold for $16,000 and later for $25,000 (equivalent to $967,500 in 2025) to Joalheria Kahn and Co. and shipped to G. Kahn in Paris, who sold it to I. K. Gulland of London in September 1895 for £6,400 (equivalent to £727,578 in 2025). It was then broken up into small 3–6-carat (0.60–1.20 g; 0.021–0.042 oz) pieces as industrial diamond drills.

The precise circumstances of the Sergio's discovery and its export to Paris and then London have since been re-examined and extensively corrected, as several earlier publications contained historical or scientific errors.

Like other carbonados, the Sergio is believed to be of meteoritic origin. However, most recent publications (and many others) have confirmed that this cosmological hypothesis is becoming less credible, as various teams have measured clearly terrestrial characteristics in various carbonados, including possible isotopic signatures of terrestrial biological origin (such as the ^{13}C isotope and many other arguments).

Between 2023 and 2024, two historical casts (from December 1895) of Sergio were found at the Natural History Museum in London, and an older one (from September 1895) at the French National Museum of Natural History (acronym in French: MNHN) in Paris, which cast had been made by the French chemist and Nobel Prize winner, Henri Moissan.

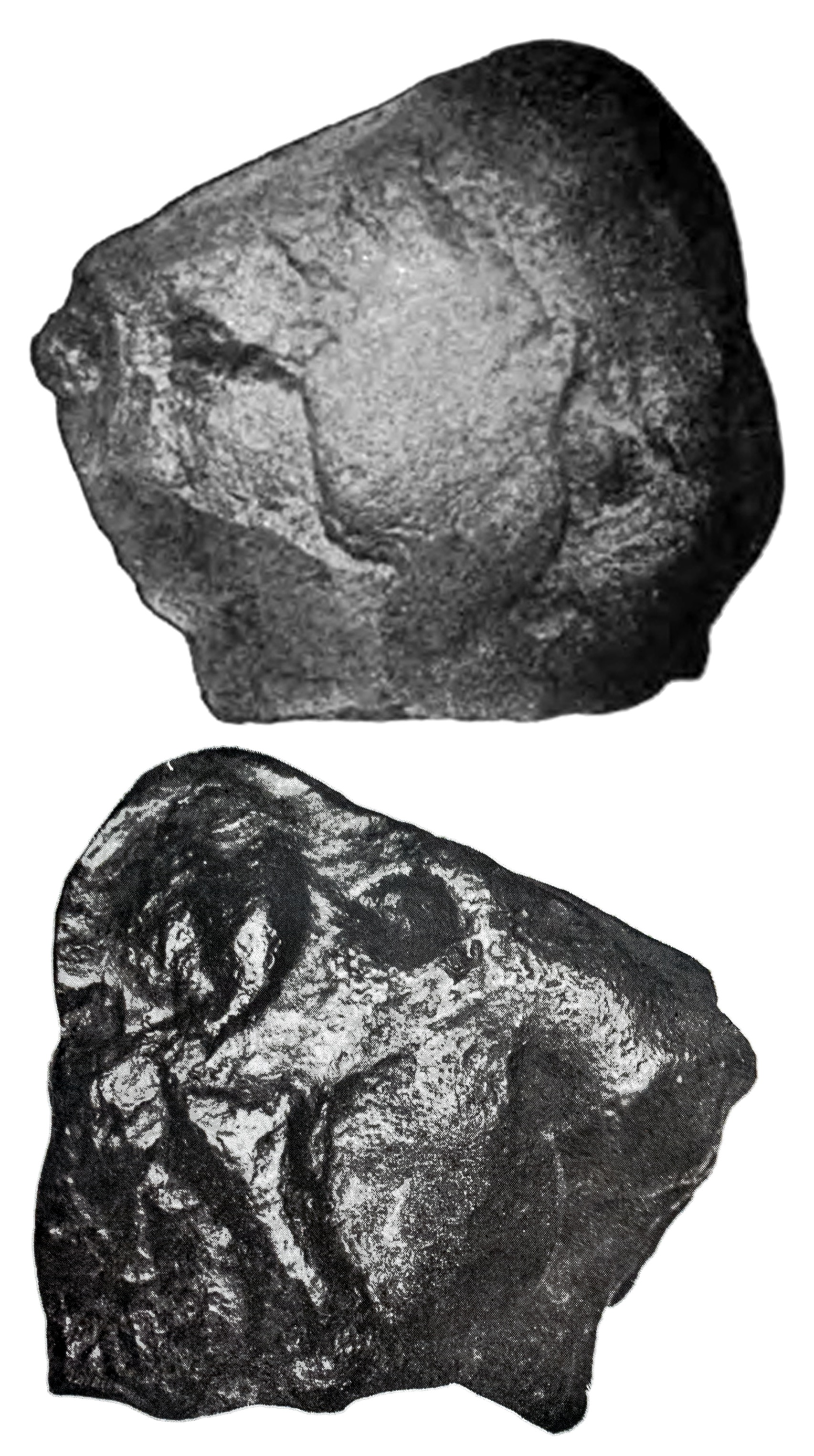
These two historical images (1895) likely depict the authentic Sergio carbonado, which was photographed by J. Baszanger in Paris and subsequently featured in various publications, including "Les pierres précieuses" by Jean Escard (Dunod, 1914). Compare this with the better-known image from Popular Science Monthly (above), which is more likely to depict the specimen presented by Henri Moissan to the Instituto Geográfico e Histórico da Bahia. This object, most likely a cast, was featured in an article by H. W. Furniss (1913), and the above photograph was taken from this article. See Farges (2025) for full details.

A photograph of the Sergio before its destruction was even found at the French MNHN in 2025: it was originally published in 1913 in a book by J. Escard without its name ‘Sergio’, a name that was coined much later by the Gemological Institute of America around 1955. An image analysis using hierarchical clustering based on different linkage methods (WARD, SSIM) proves that the best-known photograph of this carbonado (1906, published above in Popular Science Monthly) is probably the photograph taken around 1900 of a fourth moulding then kept (not yet found) at the Instituto Geográfico e Histórico da Bahia (IGHB). This photograph shows an object that has all the characteristics of the cast found in Paris and donated by Moissan to the IGHB.

Finally, the Sergio's weight was revised in 2025 because it was given in 1895 in old Brazilian carats and had not been converted to modern metric carats: thus, the published weight of 3,167 carats (actually old carats or karats) has been corrected to 3,245 modern metric carats, as confirmed by the analysis (scanner) of the Paris cast at the MNHN as well as writings of Henri Moissan himself in 1895.

A fifth cast of the Sergio was 3D printed from polylactic acid and donated in 2025 by MNHN Prof. Francois Farges to the Sociedade União dos Mineiros (SUM, Mining Union Society) in Lençóis, where it has been on display ever since.

== See also ==
- List of diamonds
- List of largest rough diamonds
- Black Falcon Diamond
