= Imperial Treasury =

Imperial Treasury may refer to:

- Imperial treasury, Istanbul (Hazine-i Âmire), the crown jewels and other treasures of the Ottoman Empire
- Imperial treasury, Moscow (Императорская сокровищница), the crown jewels and regalia of the Russian Empire
- Imperial treasury, Rome (fiscus), the personal wealth of the Roman emperor.
- Imperial Treasury, Vienna (Schatzkammer), the crown jewels and regalia of the Holy Roman Empire
