= Sinitsyn =

Sinitsyn, Sinicyn or Sinitsin (Russian: Синицын, from синица meaning tit) is a Russian masculine surname, its feminine counterpart is Sinitsyna, Sinicyna or Sinitsina. It may refer to

- Aleksei Sinitsyn (born 1976), Russian politician
- Anastasia Sinitsyna (born 1983), Russian handball player
- Anastassia Sinitsina (born 2004), Estonian chess master
- Andrei Sinitsyn (born 1988), Russian football player
- Andrei Vasilievich Sinitsyn (1939–2014), Russian geologist
- Boris Sinitsyn (born 1953), Russian football player and coach
- Dmitry Sinitsyn (born 1973), Russian Nordic combined athlete
- Dmitry Sinitsyn (ice hockey) (born 1994), Russian ice hockey player
- Rostislav Sinicyn (born 1955), Soviet ice dancer
- Valerie Sinitsin (born 1992), Russian ice dancer
- Victoria Sinitsina (born 1995), Russian ice dancer
