= Black Falcon (diamond) =

Largest cut natural diamond in the world

The Black Falcon
- Weight: 612.34 carats (122.468 g)
- Color: Fancy black (natural)
- Cut: Eagle Novelty Cut
- Country of origin: Belgium
- Mine of origin: Guinea
- Discovered: 2008
- Cut by: Peter Herbosch

The Black Falcon is the largest cut natural diamond in the world, sculpted into the shape of a falcon's head. Weighing 612.34 carats, it was fashioned from an 887.22-carat rough black diamond discovered in Guinea in 2008. The stone was processed over a period of seven years by Belgian diamond cutter Peter Herbosch using own produced laser and grinding systems.

The finished piece was certified by the Gemological Institute of America as the largest cut diamond ever recorded, its 612 carats surpassing the previous recordholder The Enigma at 555 carats. The Black Falcon has an estimated market value between €12 million and €15 million.

== Cutting and sculpting ==
Because black diamonds lack cleavage planes and have highly irregular crystal orientations, they are resistant to conventional cutting methods. Only specialized high-energy laser systems allow large-scale sculpting.

Before cutting began, Herbosch produced synthetic models of the rough stone to test laser angles and heat thresholds. Herbosch and his brother Johan further developed custom software for their precision lasers specifically for this project.

Herbosch worked with engineer Tom van Remortel to design a unique polishing system, after which master polisher Walter Verveckken executed the final surface finishing. The complete transformation of the rough stone into a unique falcon-head sculpture required seven years of continuous development and craftsmanship.

== Design and symbolism ==
The rough stone already displayed natural contours reminiscent of a bird of prey. The falcon motif was selected for its associations with pride, strength and nobility. Unlike traditional diamond cuts, The Black Falcon is considered both a gem and a sculptural artwork.

== Creator ==
Peter Herbosch (born 1958) is a Belgian diamond cutter known for pioneering the use of laser technology in diamond processing. He trained with De Beers in the 1970s, mastering the sawing and cleaving of diamonds. He later began working independently with laser technology and developed his own machines, which are now used worldwide.

For his contributions to the Belgian diamond sector, Herbosch was appointed Knight of the Order of the Crown (Ridder in de Kroonorde) by Royal Decree of 21 November 2012.

Herbosch continues to work in Antwerp’s diamond district, which handles roughly 80% of the world’s rough diamonds and about half of all polished diamonds on the international market.

== See also ==
- Spirit of de Grisogono
- Sergio
