= Amsterdam Diamond =

Pear-shaped 33.74 carat (6.748 g) black diamond

- Weight: 33.74 carats (6.748 g)
- Color: Black
- Cut: Pear

The Amsterdam Diamond is a black diamond weighing 33.74 carats (6.748 g), and has 145 facets. It is in a pear shape, and cut from a 55.85 carats (11.170 g) rough. It was sold in 2001 for $US352,000, the highest price paid for a black diamond at auction.

The diamond originated in Africa.

== Characteristics ==
The diamond weighs 33.74 carats. It is a notable black diamond, but the claim that it is “one of the largest black diamonds known” requires a specific ranking/source. The diamond is a deep black, which is relatively rare for diamonds. The black color of natural black diamonds can result from numerous inclusions, fractures, staining, and/or their polycrystalline structure; graphite is among the common inclusions.

Carbonado is a distinctive type of black, polycrystalline diamond; however, not all black diamonds are carbonado. There is some debate about how black diamonds form, but it is believed they may originate from space or through high-pressure conditions on Earth.

== History ==
The Amsterdam Diamond was discovered in Central Africa, though the specific country is not well-documented. Africa is a significant source of black diamonds, and many of these gems are found in regions like the Central African Republic or Brazil.

The diamond is named after the city of Amsterdam, Netherlands, where it was sold at auction in 2001. The auction highlighted its rarity, and it fetched a high price due to its size, color, and unique characteristics.

== See also ==
- List of diamonds
