= Spirit of de Grisogono Diamond =

One of the world's largest cut black diamonds

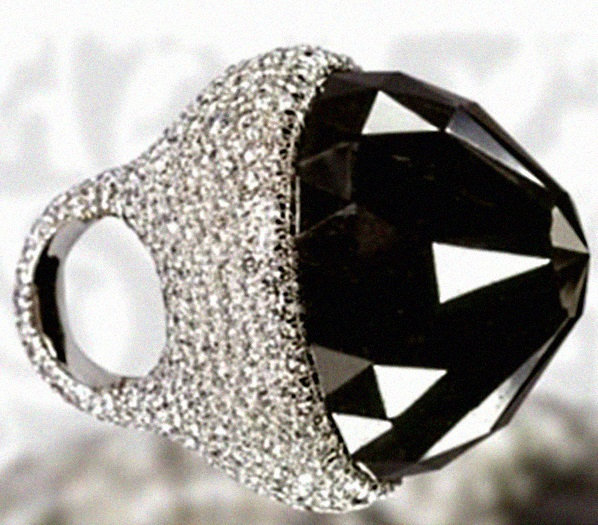
- Grisogono set in a ring
- Weight: 312.24 carats (62.448 g)
- Color: Black
- Cut: Mogul
- Country of origin: Central African Republic
- Cut by: Fawaz Gruosi
- Original owner: De Grisogono

The Spirit of de Grisogono is the world's third-largest cut black diamond. The largest is the Black Falcon followed by the Enigma. The Spirit of de Grisogono list's sixth largest diamond overall. Starting at an uncut weight of 587 carats (117.4 g), it was taken from its origin in western Central African Republic to be bought and cut by Fawaz Gruosi. The resulting mogul-cut diamond weighs 312.24 carats (62.448 g) and is set in a white gold ring with 702 smaller white diamonds totaling 36.69 carats (7.338 g). It has since been sold to a private buyer.

== See also ==
- List of diamonds

== Notes ==
- Sybarites. "Spirit of De Grisogono, The Worlds Largest Black Diamond". Retrieved Sept. 27, 2007.
- Peora. "The Spirit of De Grisogono". Retrieved Sept. 27, 2007.
