= Stephen E. Haggerty =

American geophysicist (1938–2026)

Stephen E. Haggerty (April 11, 1938 – January 2, 2026) was an American geophysicist and Fulbright scholar. He served as a principal investigator in the U.S. Apollo and the Soviet Luna sample return programs. The metallic mineral known as "haggertyite" is named in his honor.

== Background ==
Haggerty was born in South Africa on April 11, 1938. He obtained his Ph.D. in geology and geophysics at the London University. Haggerty died on January 2, 2026, at the age of 87.

== Professional background and death ==
Following his graduation from London University, Haggerty worked as a post-doctoral fellow at the Geophysical Laboratory in Washington, D.C. He later joined the faculty of University of Massachusetts Amherst, initially serving as an assistant professor and later advancing to full professorship. In 2002, he became a professor at the Florida International University in Miami.

== Research ==
Haggerty's research focuses on the origin of igneous rocks (petrogenesis), forming of the upper Earth's mantle and meteorites and rock samples from the Moon. For ten years, he served as a principal investigator in the U.S. Apollo and the Soviet Luna sample return programs. He described and named six new minerals, including one from the Moon. Haggerty's most noted work is the spectroscopical analysis of carbonado diamonds on the basis of which he developed a hypothesis that those minerals didn't form deep within the Earth's crust as normal diamonds, but were instead brought with meteorites several billion years ago.
