= Mir mine =

Former open pit diamond mine

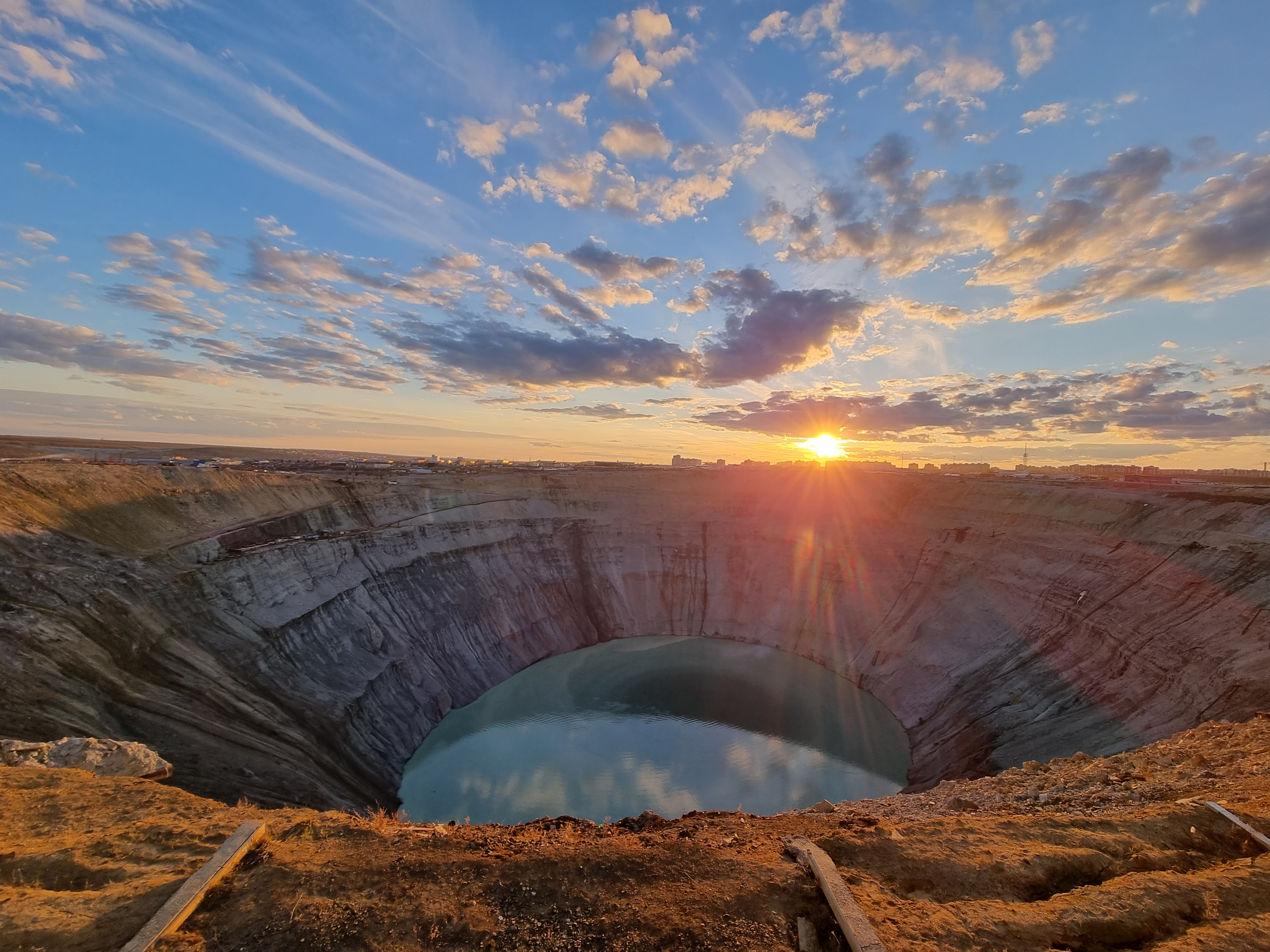
- The Mir mine in Yakutia

- Location in Sakha Republic, Russia Mir Mine (Russia)
- Location: Mirninsky District, Sakha Republic, Russia; 62°31′33″N 113°59′03″E
- Products: diamonds
- Production: 10,000,000 carats (2,000 kg) per year
- Financial year: 1960s
- Type: open-pit then underground
- Discovered: 1955
- Opened: 1957
- Company: ALROSA
- Website: Link
- Acquired: 1992

The Mir mine (Russian: Ми́р, IPA: [ˈmʲir]; lit. 'Peace'), also called the Mirny mine, is an open pit diamond mine located in Mirny, Sakha Republic, in the Siberian region of eastern Russia. It was the Soviet Union's first developed diamond mine, and became its largest after open-pit mining began in 1957. The pit is more than 525 meters (1,722 ft) deep (4th in the world), has a diameter of 1,200 m (3,900 ft), and is one of the largest excavated holes in the world.

Both of the two then-largest diamonds mined in Russia were discovered at Mir, in 1980 (weighing 342.57 carats) and 2025 (weighing 468 carats). The mine's surface operations were discontinued in 2001, but in 2009 it became active again as an underground diamond mine.

== Discovery ==
The diamond-bearing deposits were discovered on 13 June 1955 by Soviet geologists Yuri Khabardin, Ekaterina Elagina, and Viktor Avdeenko during the large Amakinsky Expedition in Yakut ASSR. There they found traces of the volcanic rock kimberlite, which is usually associated with diamonds. This was the second success in the search for kimberlite in Russia (the first being Zarnitsa mine in 1954), after numerous failed expeditions of the 1940s and 1950s. For his discovery, Khabardin was given in 1957 the Lenin Prize, one of the highest awards in the Soviet Union.

== Development ==
The development of the mine started in 1957, in extremely harsh climate conditions. Seven months of winter per year froze the ground, making it hard to mine, and during the brief summer months the ground turned to slush. Buildings had to be raised on piles, so that they would not sink from their warmth melting the permafrost. The main processing plant had to be built on better ground, found 20 km (12 mi) away from the mine. The winter temperatures were so low that car tires and steel would shatter and oil would freeze. During the winter, workers used jet engines to thaw and dig out the permafrost or blasted it with dynamite to get access to the underlying kimberlite. The entire mine had to be covered at night to prevent the machinery from freezing.

== Operations ==
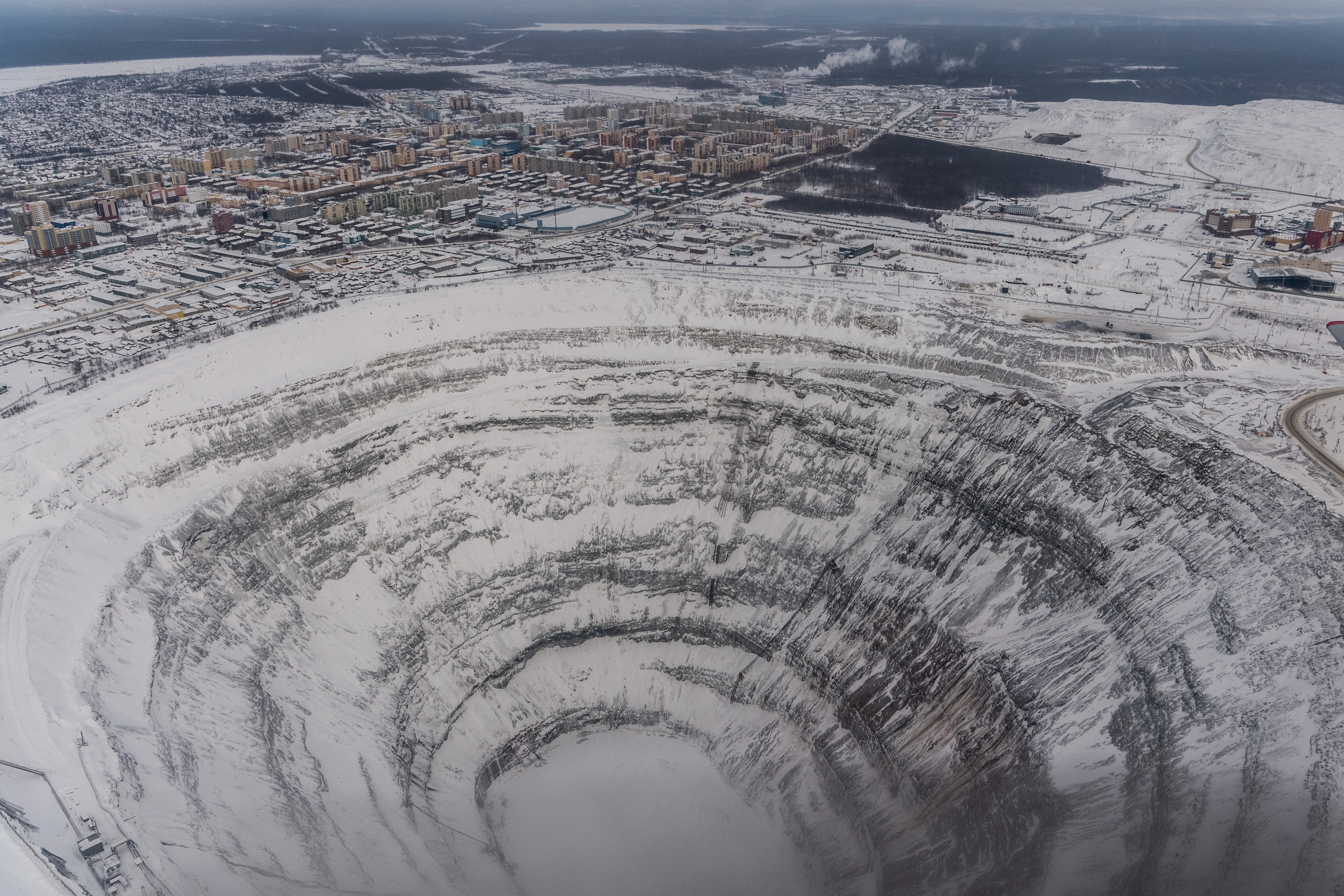
The mine in the snow

In the 1960s the mine was producing 10,000,000 carats (2,000 kg; 4,400 lb) of diamond per year, of which a relatively high fraction (20%) were of gem quality. The mine's upper layers (down to 340 m (1,120 ft)) had very high diamond contents of four carats (0.80 g) per tonne of ore, with a relatively high ratio of gems to industrial stones. The yield decreased to about 2 carats (0.40 g) per tonne and the production rate slowed to 2,000,000 carats (400 kg; 880 lb) per year near the pit bottom. The mine operation was interrupted in the 1990s at a depth of 340 m (1,120 ft) after the pit bottom became flooded, but resumed later.

The Mir mine's surface operation lasted 44 years, finally closing in June 2001. After the collapse of the USSR in the 1990s, the mine was operated by the Sakha diamond company, which reported annual profits in excess of $600 million from diamond sales.

Later, the mine was operated by Alrosa, the largest diamond producing company in Russia, and employed 3,600 workers. It had long been anticipated that the recovery of diamonds by conventional surface mining would end. Therefore in the 1970s construction of a network of tunnels for underground diamond recovery began, and by 1999 the project operated exclusively as an underground mine. In order to stabilize the abandoned surface main pit, its bottom was covered by a rubble layer 45 m (148 ft) thick. After underground operations began, the project had a mine life estimate of 27 years, based on a drilling exploration program to a depth of 1,220 m (4,000 ft). Production ceased in 2001, and the Mir mine closed in 2004.

The mine was recommissioned in 2009, and is expected to remain operational for 50 more years. The underground Mir mine flooded again in 2017, trapping over 140 miners, all but eight of whom were rescued.

== Mir's largest diamonds ==
The then-largest diamond of the mine was found on 23 December 1980; it weighed 342.5 carats (68.50 g) and was named "26th Congress of the Communist Party of the Soviet Union" (Russian: XXVI съезд КПСС).

In 2025, Alrosa announced the discovery of the largest diamond mined in Russia, a 468-carat piece named "80 Years of Victory in the Great Patriotic War" that was dug from the mine.

== See also ==
- List of mines in Russia
- Udachnaya pipe diamond mine
- Internationalnaya diamond mine
