= Grib diamond mine =

Russian diamond mine

Grib mine
- Location within Arkhangelsk Oblast Location within Russia
- Location: Mezensky District, Arkhangelsk Oblast, Russia; 65°30′27″N 41°25′22″E
- Products: diamonds
- Type: open-pit
- Discovered: 1996
- Opened: 2013
- Company: AGD DIAMONDS

The Grib mine is one of the largest diamond mines in Russia and in the world. The Grib diamond pipe is named in honor of Vladimir Grib, a post-graduate member of the exploration team, led by Andrei Vasilievich Sinitsyn, who died prior to the mine's discovery. The mine is located in the north-western part of the country in the Arkhangelsk Oblast. The mine has estimated reserves of 98.5 million carats of diamonds and an annual production capacity of 3.62 million carats.

== See also ==
- List of mines in Russia
- Lomonosov diamond mine
