= Haggertyite =

General
- Category: Oxide mineral
- Formula: Ba(Fe^{2+}_{6}Ti_{5}Mg)O_{19}
- IMA symbol: Hgt
- Strunz classification: 4.CC.45
- Crystal system: Hexagonal
- Crystal class: Dihexagonal dipyramidal (6/mmm); H-M symbol: (6/m 2/m 2/m)
- Space group: P6_{3}/mmc
- Unit cell: a = 5.926, c = 23.32 [Å]; Z = 2

Identification
- Color: Gray
- Crystal habit: Microscopic hexagonal platelets
- Mohs scale hardness: 5
- Luster: Metallic
- Diaphaneity: Opaque
- Specific gravity: 4.87 (calculated)

Haggertyite is a rare barium, iron, magnesium, titanate mineral: Ba(Fe^{2+}_{6}Ti_{5}Mg)O_{19} first described in 1996 from the Crater of Diamonds State Park near Murfreesboro in Pike County, Arkansas. The microscopic metallic mineral crystallizes in the hexagonal system and forms tiny hexagonal plates associated with richterite and serpentinitized olivine of mafic xenoliths in the lamproite host rock. It is an iron(II) rich member of the magnetoplumbite group. It is a light grey opaque mineral with calculated Mohs hardness of 5.

It was named for geophysicist Stephen E. Haggerty (born 1938) of the Florida International University.
