= Orlov (diamond) =

Large diamond of Indian origin

Orlov diamond
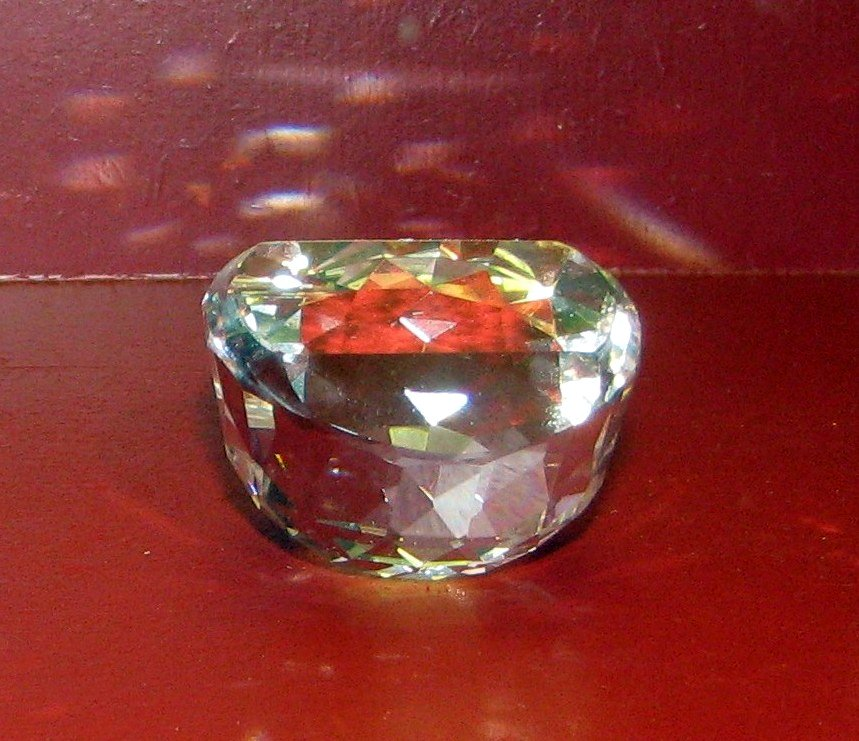
- Copy of the Orlov diamond (it is turned upside-down in this photo)
- Weight: 189.62 carats (37.924 g)
- Country of origin: India
- Mine of origin: Kollur Mine
- Owner: Kremlin Diamond Fund

The Orlov (sometimes spelled Orloff), also often considered to be the same diamond known as The Great Mughal Diamond, is a large diamond of Indian origin, currently displayed as a part of the Diamond Fund collection of Moscow's Kremlin Armoury. It is described as having the shape and proportions of half a chicken's egg. In 1774, it was encrusted into the Imperial Sceptre of Russian Empress Catherine the Great.

== History ==
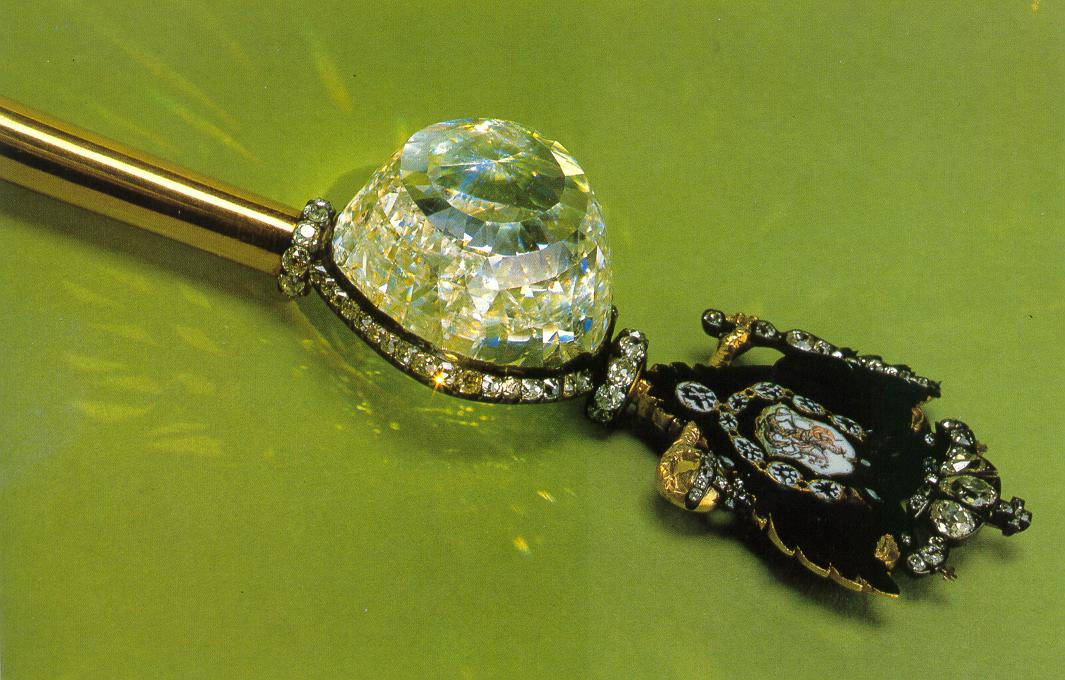
Orlov diamond in the Imperial Sceptre

The diamond was found in the 17th century in Golconda, India. According to one legend, a French soldier who had deserted during the Carnatic wars in Srirangam disguised himself as a Hindu convert in order to steal it in 1747, when it served as the eye of a temple deity Sriranganathar.

The as yet unnamed stone passed from merchant to merchant, eventually appearing for sale in Amsterdam. Most modern scholars are now convinced that this stone was actually the Great Mogul Diamond. Shaffrass, an Iranian millionaire who then owned the diamond, found an eager buyer in Hovhannes Lazarian who acted on behalf of Count Grigory Grigorievich Orlov. The Count paid a purported 1.4 million Dutch florins for it.

Count Orlov had been romantically involved with Catherine the Great of Russia for many years, and he led the way in the dethronement of her husband in a coup d'état and the elevation of Catherine to power. Their relationship carried on for many years and produced an illegitimate child, but Catherine eventually forsook Count Orlov for Grigori Alexandrovich Potemkin. Count Orlov was said to have tried to rekindle their romance by offering her the diamond, as it is said he knew she had wished for it. While he failed to regain her affections, Catherine did bestow many gifts upon Count Orlov; these gifts included the Marble Palace in Saint Petersburg. Catherine named the diamond after the Count, and she had her jeweller design a sceptre incorporating the diamond. Now known as the Imperial Sceptre, it was completed in 1774.

== Description ==
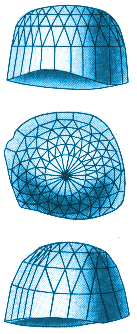
Sketch of the Orlov diamond from the book Precious Stones by Max Bauer, 1904

A description was given by Eric Burton in 1986:

The sceptre is a burnished shaft in three sections set with eight rings of brilliant-cut diamonds, including some of about 30 carats (6 g) each and fifteen weighing about 14 carats (2.8 g) each. The Orlov is set at the top, with its domed top facing forward. Above it is a double-headed eagle with the Arms of Russia enameled on its breast.

A Venetian lapidary named Ortensio Borgio was responsible for cutting the diamond.

Its colour is widely stated as white with a faint bluish-green tinge. Data released by the Kremlin gives the Orlov's measurements as 32 millimetres x 35 millimetres x 21 millimetres, its weight being 189.62 carats (37.924 g). The weight is just an estimate – it has not formally been weighed in many years.Lord Twining's book A History of the Crown Jewels of Europe mentions how once, during a circa 1913 inspection of the crown jewels by the curator, the stone accidentally fell out of its sceptre. He weighed the stone, but did not write down its exact weight. He later said that it was about 190 carats (38 g), which corresponds to the measurement-based estimate.

== See also ==
- List of famous diamonds

== Works cited ==
- Erlich, Edward; Hausel, W. Dan (2002). Diamond deposits: origin, exploration, and history of discovery. USA: Society of Mining, Metallurgy, and Exploration, Inc.(SME). ISBN 0-87335-213-0.
- Jaques, Tony (2007). Dictionary of battles and sieges: a guide to 8,500 battles from Antiquity through the Twenty-first Century, Volume 3. USA: Greenwood Publishing Group. ISBN 978-0-313-33539-6.
- Malecka, Anna (2014), "Did Orlov buy the Orlov ? ", Gems & Jewellery: The Gemmological Association of Great Britain, vol. 23 (6), July, pp. 10–12.
- Malecka, Anna (2016), The Great Mughal and the Orlov: One and the Same Diamond? The Journal of Gemmology, vol. 35, no. 1, 56–63.
- Shipley, Robert (1939). Famous Diamonds of the World, pp. 15–18. Gemological Institute of America, USA
- Twining, Lord Edward Francis (1960). A History of the Crown Jewels of Europe, B.T. Batsford Ltd., London, England.
- Streeter, Edwin W. (1882). "The Orloff". The Great Diamonds Of The World: Their History And Romance. London: George Bell & Sons. pp. 103–115.
