= Severalmaz =

Russian diamond mining company

- Native name: Севералмаз
- Company type: Public joint-stock company
- Founded: 1992
- Headquarters: Arkhangelsk, Russia
- Key people: Andrey Pismenny (CEO)
- Products: diamonds
- Parent: ALROSA (99,62 %)
- Website: www.severalmaz.ru

JSC «Severalmaz» is a Russian diamond mining company. It is a subsidiary of JSC "Alrosa" and holds a license for Europe's largest Lomonosov diamond mine, in Arkhangelsk Oblast, with reserves of 220 million carats of rough diamonds. Production in 2009 amounted to 500,000 carats of rough diamonds.

== Shareholders ==
99.6% of shares belong to JSC "ALROSA", 0.38% — to minority shareholders.

== 2017 pink diamond find ==
On September 21, 2017, TASS news agency reported Alrosa's most expensive gem to date, a 28.65 carat pink diamond. The largest pink diamond previously mined by Alrosa weighed 3.86 carats, one of a total of only three others that the company has mined of over two carats each during the past eight years. The gem is reported to be of jewelry quality, measuring 22.47 x 15.69 x 10.9 millimetres, with a saturated pink tone and practically no defects, according to Alrosa.

The pink diamond was mined by subsidiary Almazy Anabara, operator of the Severalmaz kimberlite pipes and placer deposits near rivers in the northwest part of Yakutia.

== Links ==
- Official website
