= Great Mogul Diamond =

Diamond found in India

Great Mogul
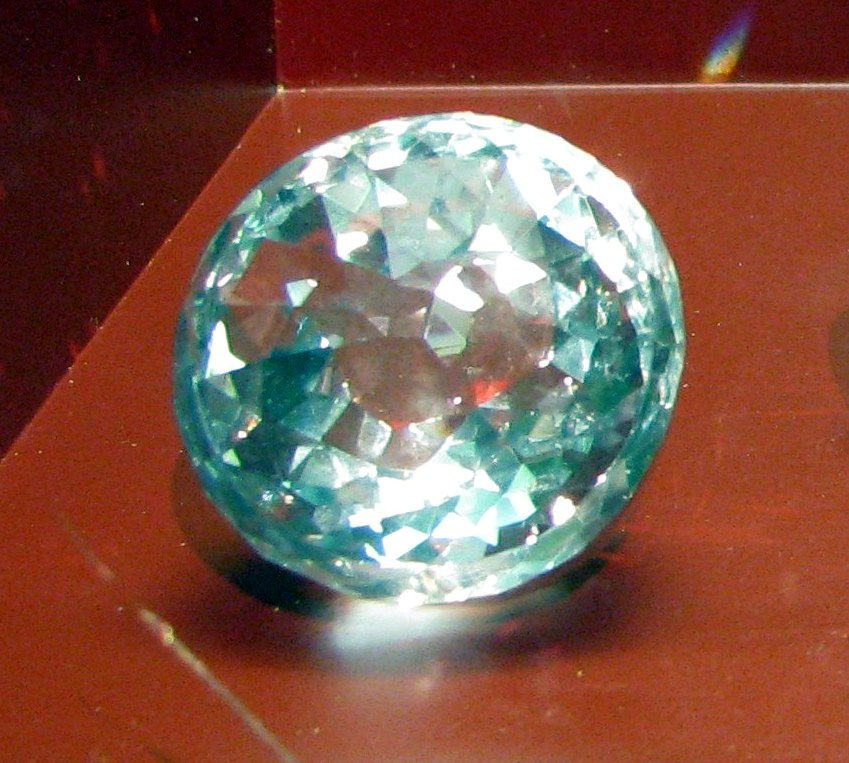
- A replica of the Great Moghul Diamond
- Weight: 280 carats (56 g)
- Country of origin: India
- Mine of origin: Kollur Mine

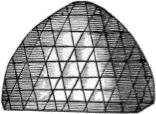
Drawing of the Great Moghul Diamond, by Tavernier in 1666

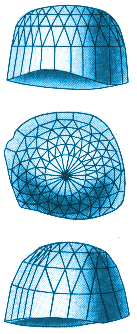
Sketch of the Orlov diamond from the book Precious Stones by Max Bauer, 1904

The Great Mogul was a large diamond that is believed to have been discovered around 1650, most probably around the Kollur Mine in the Golconda region of southern India. Tavernier described the diamond thus: "The stone is of the same form as if one cut an egg through the middle".

== History ==
The 787-carat (157.4 g) rough diamond was given by Emir Jemla to Shah Jahan, the 5th Mughal emperor, as part of diplomacy between the two families.

Jemla described it as "that celebrated diamond which has been generally deemed unparalleled in size and beauty."

A Venetian lapidary named Ortensio Borgio was assigned to cut the stone. It is believed that the Great Mogul Diamond exhibited several inclusions. Rejecting the idea of cutting the diamond into several fine stones, Borgio decided to address the inclusion problem by grinding away at it until the unwanted flaws were gone. Much to the horror of the Emperor, Borgio's work yielded very poor results, including a great loss of weight. Shah Jahan spared Borgio's head, instead fining him 10,000 rupees (all the money he had) for his ineptitude. Originally this story was believed to refer to the Koh-i-Noor Diamond; recent research appears to indicate that it instead refers to this stone.

Around 1665 Shah Jahan's son, Aurangzeb, showed the stone to the famous jeweler and world traveler Jean Baptiste Tavernier. At that time Tavernier wrote in his Six Voyages: "The first piece that Akel Khan (Chief Keeper of the King's jewels) placed in my hands was the great diamond, which is rose cut, round and very high on one side. On the lower edge there is a slight crack, and a little flaw in it. Its water is fine, and weighs 319 1/2 ratis, which makes 280 of our carats, the rati being 7/8^{th} of a carat."

Most modern scholars are now convinced that the Great Mogul is actually the Orlov Diamond, today part of Catherine the Great's imperial Russian sceptre in the Kremlin.

== The Great Mogul in fiction ==
- Sir Arthur Conan Doyle's novel The Sign of the Four has the ex-convict Jonathan Small stealing a treasure stash containing the Great Mogul twice—once in 1857, and finding and stealing it again in 1888—only to throw it into the River Thames before being captured by Sherlock Holmes and the police.
- In the 1898 science fiction novel Edison's Conquest of Mars, the King of Siam produces the Great Mogul to help fund the invasion of Mars.
- Bangladeshi writer Qazi Anwar Hussain used the stone in his writing. His most famous fictional character, Masud Rana, finds the diamond and other historical materials in the book I Love You, Man. The story is about finding the materials and facing the dangers.

== See also ==
- Orlov Diamond
- Koh-i-Noor
- Darya-ye Noor
- List of famous diamonds
