= Lomonosov diamond mine =

Russian diamond mine

Lomonosov mine
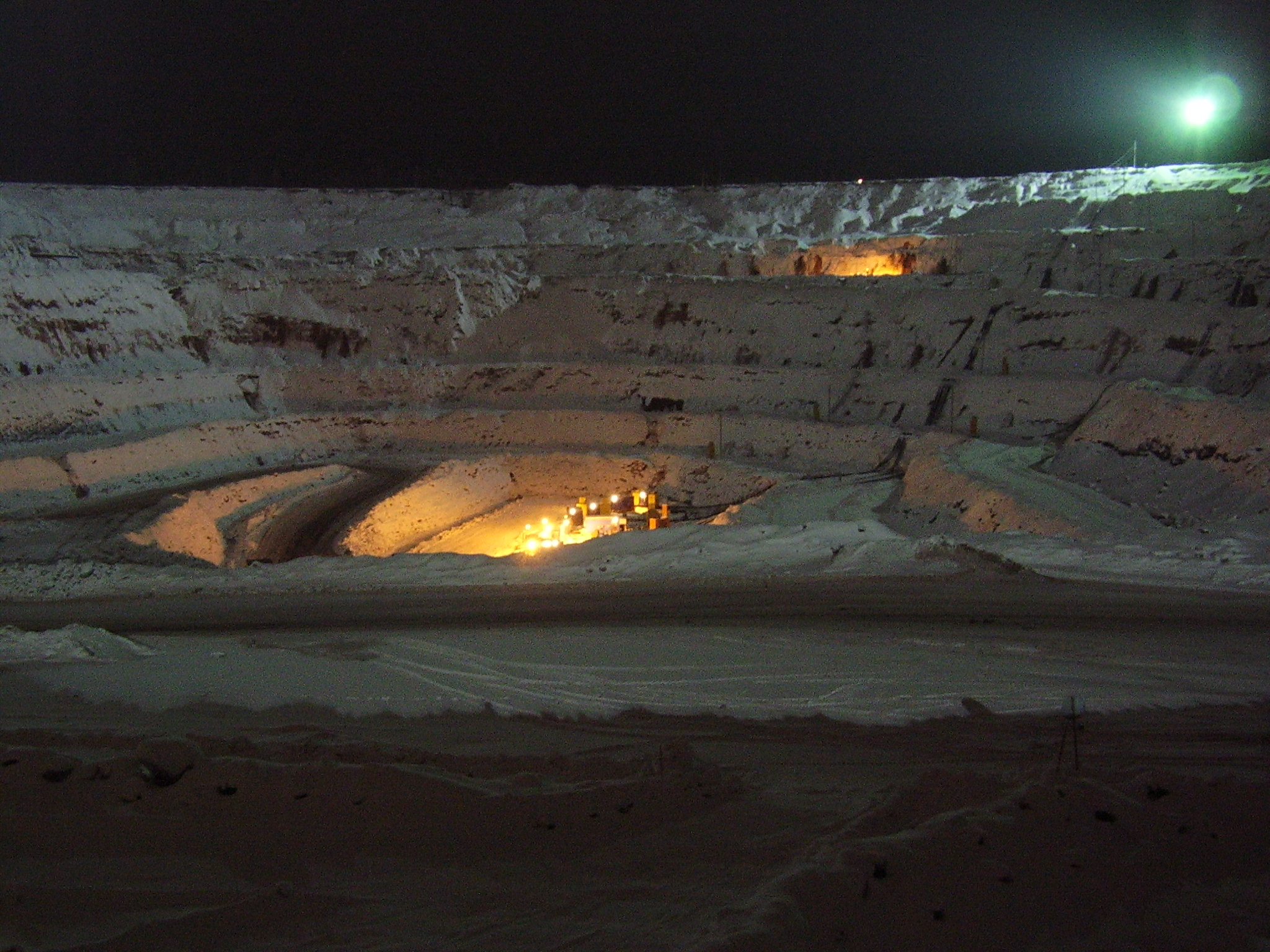

- Location within Arkhangelsk Oblast Location within Russia
- Location: Primorsky District, Arkhangelsk Oblast, Russia; 65°17′28″N 41°01′05″E
- Products: diamonds
- Type: open-pit
- Discovered: 1980
- Opened: 2005
- Company: Severalmaz

The Lomonosov mine is one of the largest diamond mines in Russia and in the world. The mine is located in the north-western part of the country in the Arkhangelsk Oblast. The mine has estimated reserves of 220 million carats of diamonds and an annual production capacity of 2 million carats.

== History ==
Despite the international sanctions during the Russian invasion of Ukraine, production at the Lomonosov mine remained stable in 2024 and 2025, at a 3.5 million carats annual output.

== Environmental impact of deposit mining ==
The forecasted mass of diamond clay tailings (saponite) to be discharged is 68 million tons if mining to the depths of 460 m. Reserves for two pipes have been determined down to 460 m, yet Severalmaz's current plan is to complete open-pit mining on them by about 2026 when Arkhangelskaya is down to 324 m (currently at 154 m) and Karpinskogo-1 down to 260 m (currently at 105 m); a decision will then be made about whether it is more profitable to continue mining deeper or to mine one of the other pipes such as Pionerskaya. The tailings of diamond ore dressing waste are situated in complex geological conditions of high-groundwater influx and harsh cold climate with low levels of solar radiation and the average annual temperature below freezing point. Furthermore, the adjoining protected forests with a significant diversity of biogeocenoses and salmon-spawning rivers are affected by the storage area. Reducing the impact of the tailings can be achieved through the reuse of the stored clay magnesia rocks obtained from saponite-containing suspension.

Electrochemical separation helps to obtain modified saponite-containing products with high smectite-group minerals concentrations, lower mineral particles size, more compact structure, and greater surface area. These characteristics open possibilities for the manufacture of high-quality ceramics and heavy-metal sorbents from saponite-containing products. Furthermore, tail grinding occurs during the preparation of the raw material for ceramics; this waste reprocessing is of high importance for the use of clay pulp as a neutralizing agent, as fine particles are required for the reaction. Experiments on the Histosol deacidification with the alkaline clay slurry demonstrated that neutralization with the average pH level of 7.1 is reached at 30% of the pulp added and an experimental site with perennial grasses proved the efficacy of the technique. Moreover, the reclamation of disturbed lands is an integral part of the social and environmental responsibility of the mining company and this scenario addresses the community necessities at both local and regional levels.

== Licenses ==
- АРХ10496КЭ: August 7, 1997 – December 20, 2018, JSC Severalmaz, to use subsoil for exploration and extraction of mineral raw materials.

== See also ==
- List of mines in Russia
- Grib diamond mine
