= Andrei Vasilievich Sinitsyn =

Soviet and Russian geologist

Andrei Vasilievich Sinitsyn (Russian: Андрей Васильевич Синицын; 18 May 1939 – 27 December 2014) was a Soviet/Russian geologist, geochemist and philosopher. Through the re-examination of exotic rocks that had been discovered but neglected by other geologists, Sinitsyn identified these rocks as kimberlites and that the Archangel region of the Soviet Union was diamondiferous. Based on this research he led teams that discovered the Lomonosov and Grib diamond mines, the latter considered to be one of the largest diamond mines in the world.

== Early life and education ==
Sinitsyn was born in Leningrad, May 18, 1939 to a family of scientists and geologists and as a child lived in China and Central Asia. In 1956 he enrolled at the Geological Department of the Leningrad State University and graduated with honors in 1961. He completed his PhD in two years on the "Petrology of dolerite of the East Murmansk coast (Kola Peninsula)” and went to work for Sevzapgeologiya, Kola Peninsula as part of their cartographic detachment (White Sea). In 1974 at Leningrad State University he defended his Grand Phd (DSc equivalent) dissertation on the topic of "South-eastern part of the Baltic Shield (problems of the structure and development)". He was the youngest person to be awarded a Grand Phd in geological-mineralogical sciences in the history of the Soviet Union.
