= Diamond Fund =

State owned diamond collection

Coordinates: 55°44′58″N 37°36′49″E

Diamond Fund Алмазный фонд
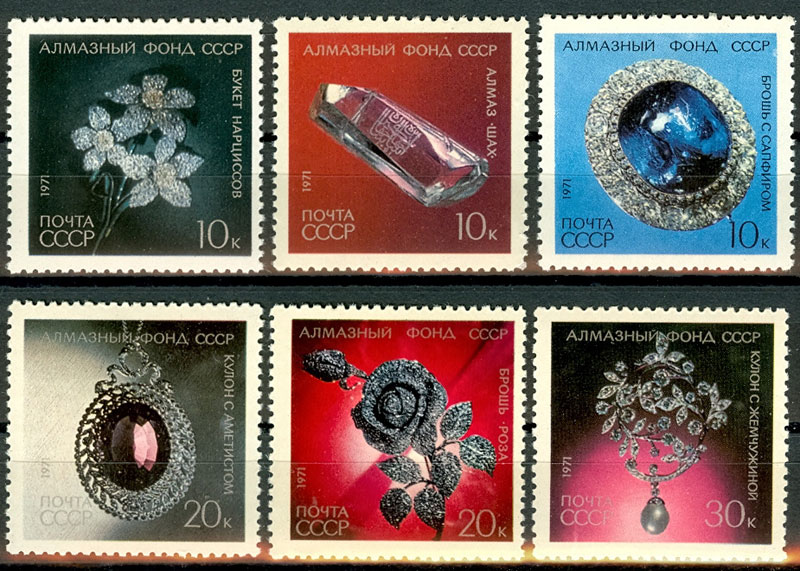
- Stamps exhibiting some of the Diamond Fund collection
- Established: 2 November 1967; 58 years ago
- Location: Moscow, Russia
- Type: Diamond collection
- Website: Official site

The Diamond Fund (Russian: Алмазный фонд) is a unique collection of gems, jewelry and natural nuggets, which are stored and exhibited in the Kremlin Armoury in Russia. The Fund was opened in 1967 and its collection dates back to the Russian Crown treasury instituted by Emperor Peter I of Russia in 1719.

== History ==
=== Imperial treasury ===
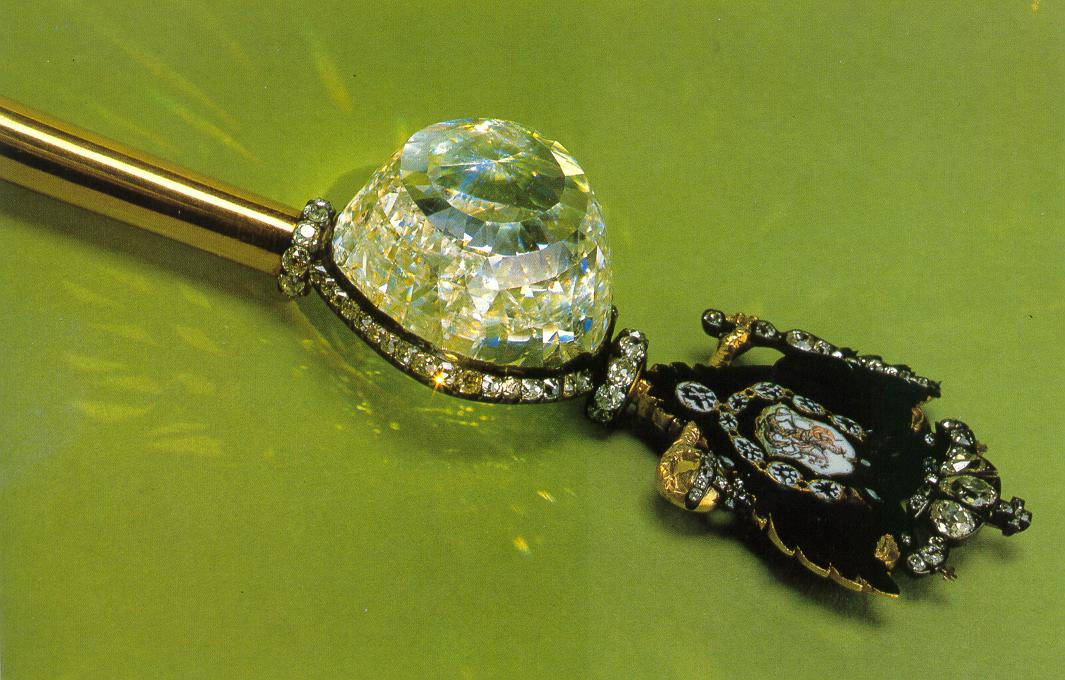
Imperial scepter with the "Orlov" diamond

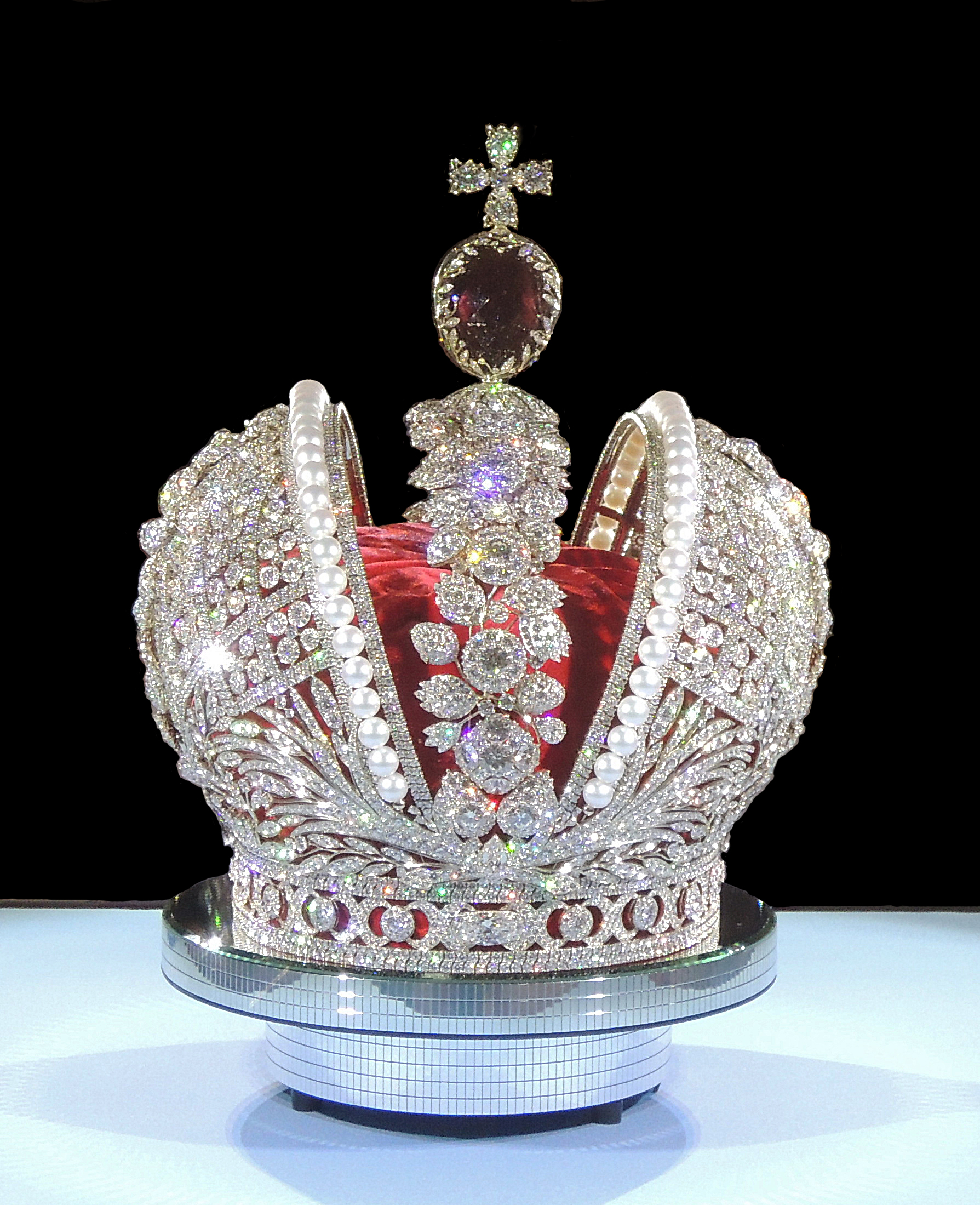
A copy of the Imperial Crown of Russia as made in 1762 for the coronation of Catherine the Great

The gem collection of Peter I, established in 1719, was later stored in the Diamond Chamber (Бриллиантовая комната) in the Winter Palace. All succeeding monarchs added their contributions to the Chamber. A 1922 study by Alexander Fersman identified 85% of all exhibits to be from 1719 to 1855, to emperors Peter I through Nicholas I, and only 15% attributed from the last three emperors.

Catherine the Great exhibited a particular interest for gemstones, even naming her stallion "Diamond." The Diamond Fund received more contributions from her than any other monarch.

=== Soviet Union ===
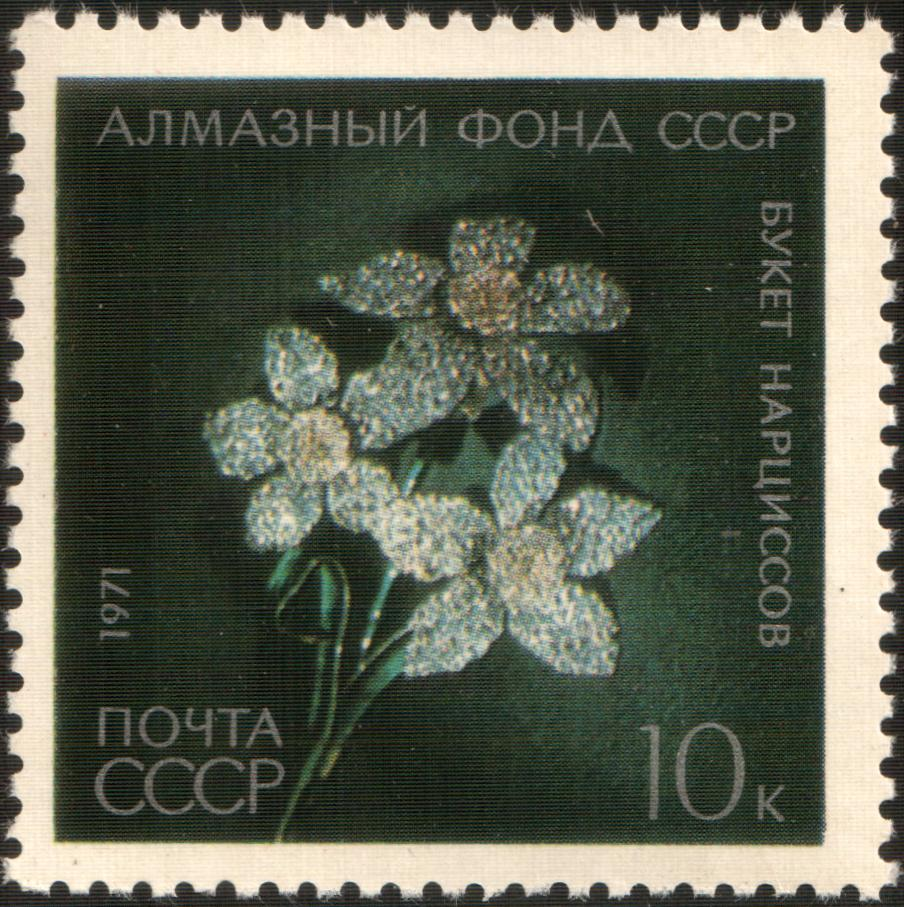
Daffodil Bouquet, 18th century, exhibited in the Diamond Fund (1971 postage stamp)

Preservation, sales and looting of Imperial treasures after the Russian Revolution of 1917 are a matter of controversy and speculation. The Imperial collection was moved from Saint Petersburg to Moscow during World War I; the Soviet Diamond Fund was officially established in 1922.

The treasure was first exhibited to the public in November 1967. Originally a short-term show, it became a permanent exhibition in 1968. During the late Soviet period, the value of the Fund's collection was estimated to be $7 billion.

=== Russian Federation ===
The Russian State retains the monopoly for mining and distribution of gemstones, as set by the 1998 law "On precious metals and precious stones". Diamond Fund operations are regulated by the 1999 presidential decree (official text). The Diamond Fund is part of a larger State Fund of Precious Stones, managed by the Ministry of Finance, and accumulates the most valuable items, in particular

- All raw diamonds exceeding 50 carats (10 g)
- All cut diamonds exceeding 20 carats (4 g), cut diamonds of exceptional quality exceeding 6 carats (1.2 g)
- All raw emeralds, rubies, sapphires exceeding 30 carats (6 g) raw or 20 carats (4 g) cut
- Unique nuggets, amber, pearl and jewellery

==== Recent additions ====
- 2006 – "The Creator" (Творец), mined in Yakutia in 2004. Third largest raw diamond in the Fund, 298.48 carats (59.696 g)
- 2003 – golden nugget, 33 kg
- 1989 – "Alexander Pushkin", second-largest raw diamond, 320.65 carats (64.130 g)
- 1980 – "XXVI Congress of CPSU", largest raw diamond, 342.57 carats (68.514 g)

== Major exhibits ==
=== Seven Historical Gems ===
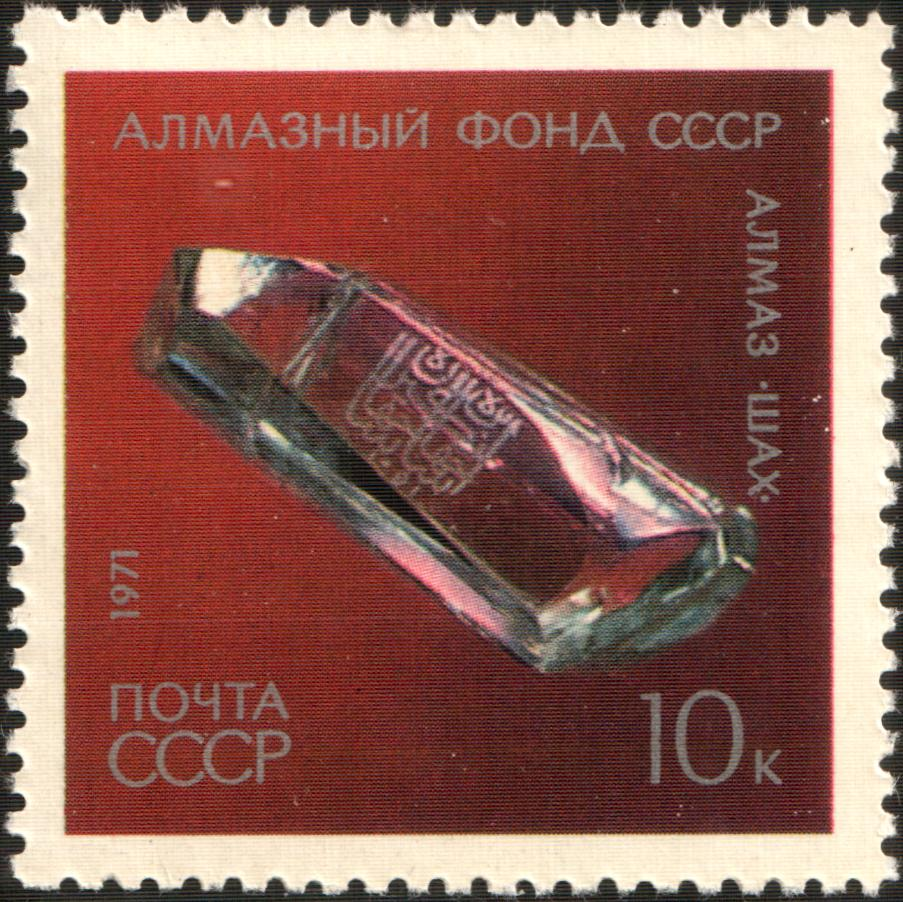
Shah Diamond (1971 postage stamp)

- Orlov diamond, 189.62 carats (37.924 g)
- Shah diamond, 88.7 carats (17.7 g), first inscription dated 1591, a gift from the Shah of Persia in 1829
- Flat portrait diamond, 25 carats (5 g)
- Spinel of the Great Imperial Crown, 398.72 carats (79.744 g), purchased in China in 1676
- Sapphire, 260.37 carats (52.074 g)
- Colombian emerald, 136.25 carats (27.250 g)
- Olive-green chrysolite, 192.6 carats (38.52 g)

=== Crowns of Russia ===
- Imperial Crown of Russia made for Catherine II, 1762

=== Jewellery ===
- The Daffodil Bouquet
- The Blue Fountain

=== Nuggets ===
- "The Great Triangle", gold, 36.2 kg (mined in 1842 in Miass)
- "The Camel", gold, 9.28 kg
- "Mephisto", gold, 20.25 g (mined in 1944 in Kolyma)

== Public access ==
The Diamond Fund is exhibited in the Kremlin Armoury building. For visitors, it is accessible only through tours of fixed duration due to the limited space inside the Fund. Tours in Russian are organized daily, at twenty-minute intervals. Foreign visitors can receive an audioguide in English, German, French, Spanish, Italian, Chinese or Japanese.

== See also ==
- List of diamonds
- Alrosa
- Pink diamond
- Jewels! The Glitter of the Russian Court
