= 26th Congress of the Communist Party of the Soviet Union (diamond) =

Largest diamond ever found in Russia or the former USSR as of 2016

- Weight: 342.57 carats (68.514 g)
- Color: Fancy lemon yellow
- Country of origin: Soviet Union
- Mine of origin: Mir mine
- Discovered: 1980
- Cut by: Raw
- Original owner: Government of the Soviet Union
- Owner: Diamond Fund, Moscow Kremlin
- Estimated value: Never put on sale

The 26th Congress of the Communist Party of the Soviet Union (26th Congress of the CPSU, Russian: XXVI съезд КПСС) is a 342.57 carat fancy lemon yellow raw diamond, the largest gem diamond ever found in Russia or the territory of the former Soviet Union, and one of the largest in the world.

It was mined at the Mir kimberlitic pipe in Yakutia, Far Eastern Federal District on December 23, 1980, and named after the 26th Congress of the Communist Party of the Soviet Union, opening February 23, 1981.

It is kept in the Russian Diamond Fund (Moscow Kremlin).

== See also ==
- List of diamonds
- List of largest rough diamonds
