= Carbonado =

Impure form of polycrystalline diamond

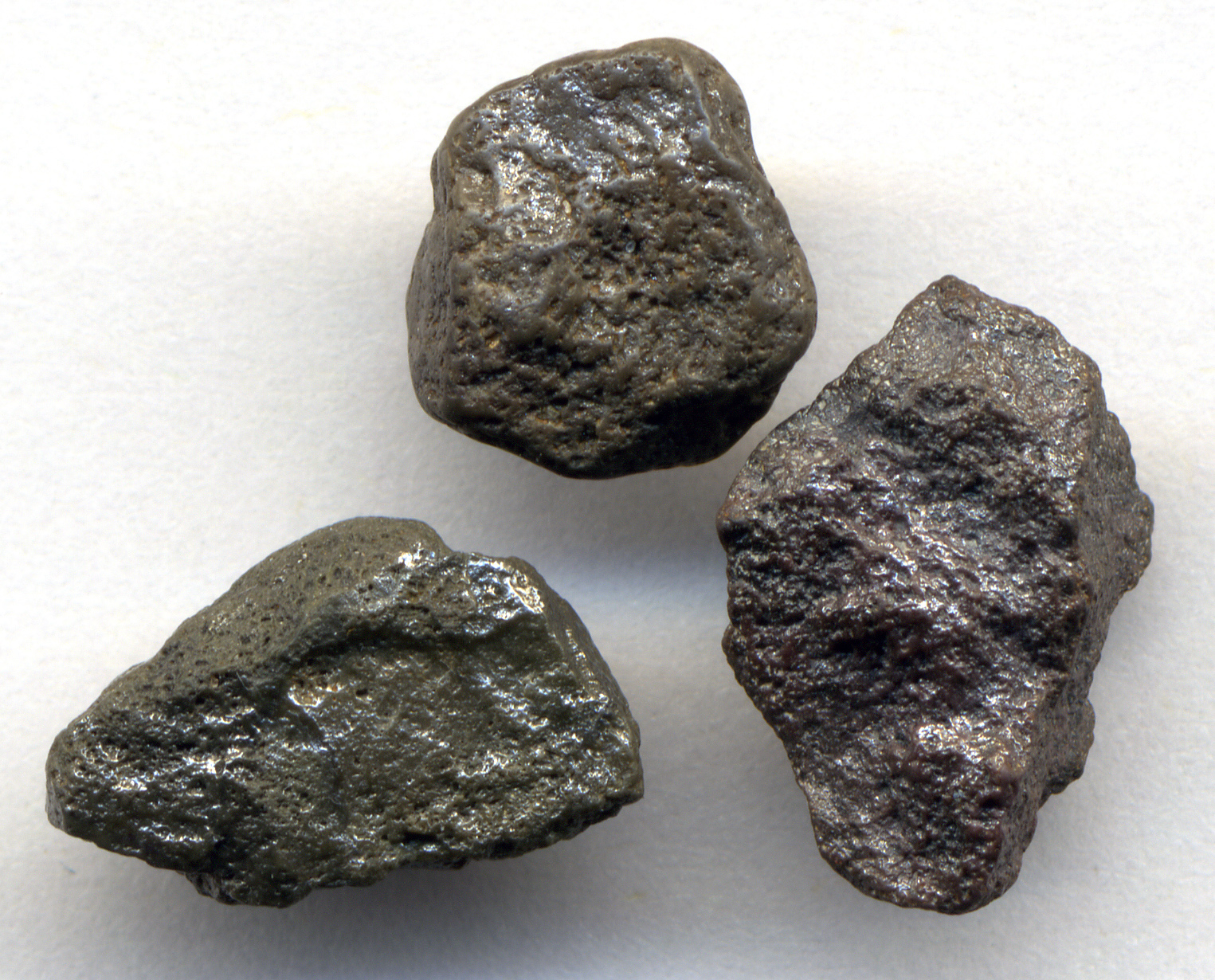
- Three carbonados from the Central African Republic

General
- Category: Native minerals
- Formula: C
- Crystal system: Isometric-hexoctahedral (cubic)

Identification
- Formula mass: 12.01 Da
- Color: Typically black, can be grey, various shades of green and brown sometimes mottled.
- Crystal habit: Polycrystalline
- Fracture: Irregular torn surfaces
- Mohs scale hardness: 10
- Luster: Adamantine
- Streak: White
- Specific gravity: 3.52±0.01
- Density: 3.5–3.53 g/cm^{3}
- Polish luster: Adamantine
- Optical properties: None
- Birefringence: None
- Pleochroism: None

Carbonado, commonly known as black diamond, is one of the toughest forms of natural diamond. It is an impure, high-density, micro-porous form of polycrystalline diamond consisting of diamond, graphite, and amorphous carbon, with minor crystalline precipitates filling pores and occasional reduced metal inclusions. Titanium nitride (TiN, osbornite) has been found in carbonado. It is found primarily in alluvial deposits where it is most prominent in mid-elevation equatorial regions such as Central African Republic and in Brazil, where the vast majority of carbonado diamondites have been found. Its natural colour is black or dark grey, and it is more porous than other diamonds.

== Unusual properties ==
Carbonado diamonds are typically pea-sized or larger porous aggregates of many tiny black crystals. The most characteristic carbonados are mined in the Central African Republic and in Brazil, in neither place associated with kimberlite, the source of typical gem diamonds. Lead isotope analyses have been interpreted as documenting crystallization of carbonados about 3 billion years ago; yet carbonado is found in younger sedimentary rocks.

Mineral grains included within diamonds have been studied extensively for clues to diamond origin. Some typical diamonds contain inclusions of common mantle minerals such as pyrope and forsterite, but such mantle minerals have not been observed in carbonado. In contrast, some carbonados contain authigenic inclusions of minerals characteristic of the Earth's crust; the inclusions do not necessarily establish formation of the diamonds in the crust, because while the obvious crystal inclusions occur in the pores that are common in carbonados, they may have been introduced after carbonado formation. Inclusions of other minerals, rare or nearly absent in the Earth's crust, are found at least partly incorporated in diamond, not just in pores: among such other minerals are those with compositions of Si, SiC, and Fe‑Ni. No distinctive high-pressure minerals, including the hexagonal carbon polymorph, lonsdaleite, have been found as inclusions in carbonados although such inclusions might be expected if carbonados formed by meteorite impact.

Isotope studies have yielded further clues to carbonado origin. The carbon isotope value is very low (little carbon‑13 compared to carbon‑12, relative to typical diamonds).

Carbonado exhibits strong luminescence (photoluminescence and cathodoluminescence) induced by nitrogen and by vacancies existing in the crystal lattice. Luminescence halos are present around radioactive inclusions, and it is suggested that the radiation damage occurred after formation of the carbonados, an observation perhaps pertinent to the radiation hypothesis listed below.

=== Toughness vs. hardness ===
Carbonado's polycrystalline texture makes it more durable than a monocrystalline diamond. It is the same hardness as other types of diamond, but it is much tougher. Its polycrystalline texture allows a single abrasive granule to present multiple crystallographic orientations of the diamond crystal at the cutting surface and the hardest orientation does the most aggressive cutting.

Cutting tools made with carbonado last longer and require less maintenance. Carbonado was recognized as an abrasive in the 1800s and was more highly valued for its cutting and grinding effectiveness over other varieties of diamond. The problem with carbonado is its rarity. It is only found in two countries, and total worldwide production has only been a few tons. Carbonado is not an important commodity in today's abrasive market.

In the late 1800s, when De Beers was developing their diamond mines in South Africa, they preferred carbonado over their own diamonds for diamond drilling. Gardner F. Williams, General Manager of De Beers Consolidated Mines, Ltd. lamented: "Round or shot boart is found in the mines at Kimberley and is very valuable for use in diamond drilling since the Brazilian carbonado has become so scarce."

== Hypotheses for origin ==
The origin of carbonado is controversial, and some proposed hypotheses are as follows:

1. Direct conversion of organic carbon under high-pressure conditions in the Earth's interior, the most common hypothesis for diamond formation
2. Shock metamorphism induced by meteoritic impact at the Earth's surface
3. Radiation-induced diamond formation by spontaneous fission of uranium and thorium
4. Accumulated local formation in reduced organic-rich sediment over long geologic periods due to pyrometamorphic-rapid processes associated with long-duration superbolt lightning strikes, known to have similar global distribution as carbonado diamondite deposits at similar elevations.
5. Formation inside an earlier-generation giant star in our area, that long ago exploded in a supernova.
6. An origin in interstellar space, due to the impact of an asteroid, rather than being thrown from within an exploding star.

The origin of carbonado is still under debate.

=== Extraterrestrial origin hypothesis ===
Supporters of an extraterrestrial origin of carbonados such as Stephen Haggerty propose that their material source was a supernova which occurred at least 3.8 billion years ago. After coalescing and drifting through outer space for about one and a half billion years, a large mass fell to earth as a meteorite approximately 2.3 billion years ago. It possibly fragmented during entry into the Earth's atmosphere and impacted in a region which would much later split into Brazil and the Central African Republic, assumed to be the only two known locations of carbonado-diamond deposits.

The presence of osbornite, which only forms under very reducing conditions and at very high temperatures, argues for an extraterrestrial origin.

== Largest cut carbonado ==
The largest cut carbonado in the world is named "Black Falcon". It weighs 612.34 carats.

== See also ==
- Amsterdam Diamond – Pear-shaped 33.74 carat (6.748 g) black diamond
- Bort – Shards of non-gem-quality diamonds
- Korloff Noir – Black diamond
- Material properties of diamond
- Popigai diamonds – Impact crater in Siberia, Russia
- Sergio (carbonado) – Largest known rough diamond
- Spirit of de Grisogono Diamond – One of the world's largest cut black diamonds
- Superhard material – Material with Vickers hardness exceeding 40 gigapascals
- Black Falcon - the world largest cut diamond
- List of diamonds
