= Carat (mass) =

Unit of mass

carat
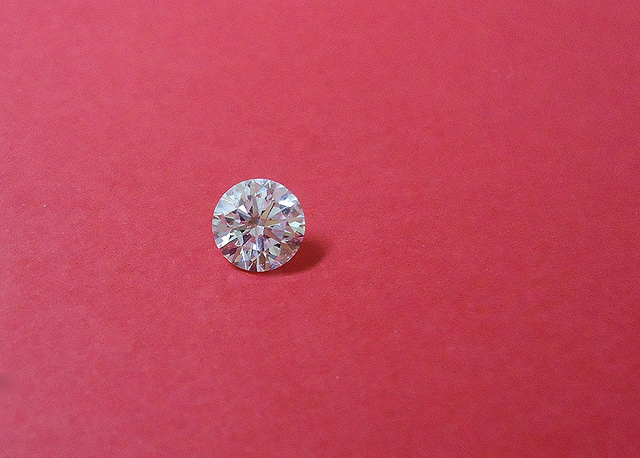
- A 1-carat (200 mg) brilliant diamond

General information
- Symbol: ct

Conversions
1 ct in ...	... is equal to ...
- milligrams: 200

Conversions (imperial)
1 imp ct in ...	... is equal to ...
- ounces: 0.00705

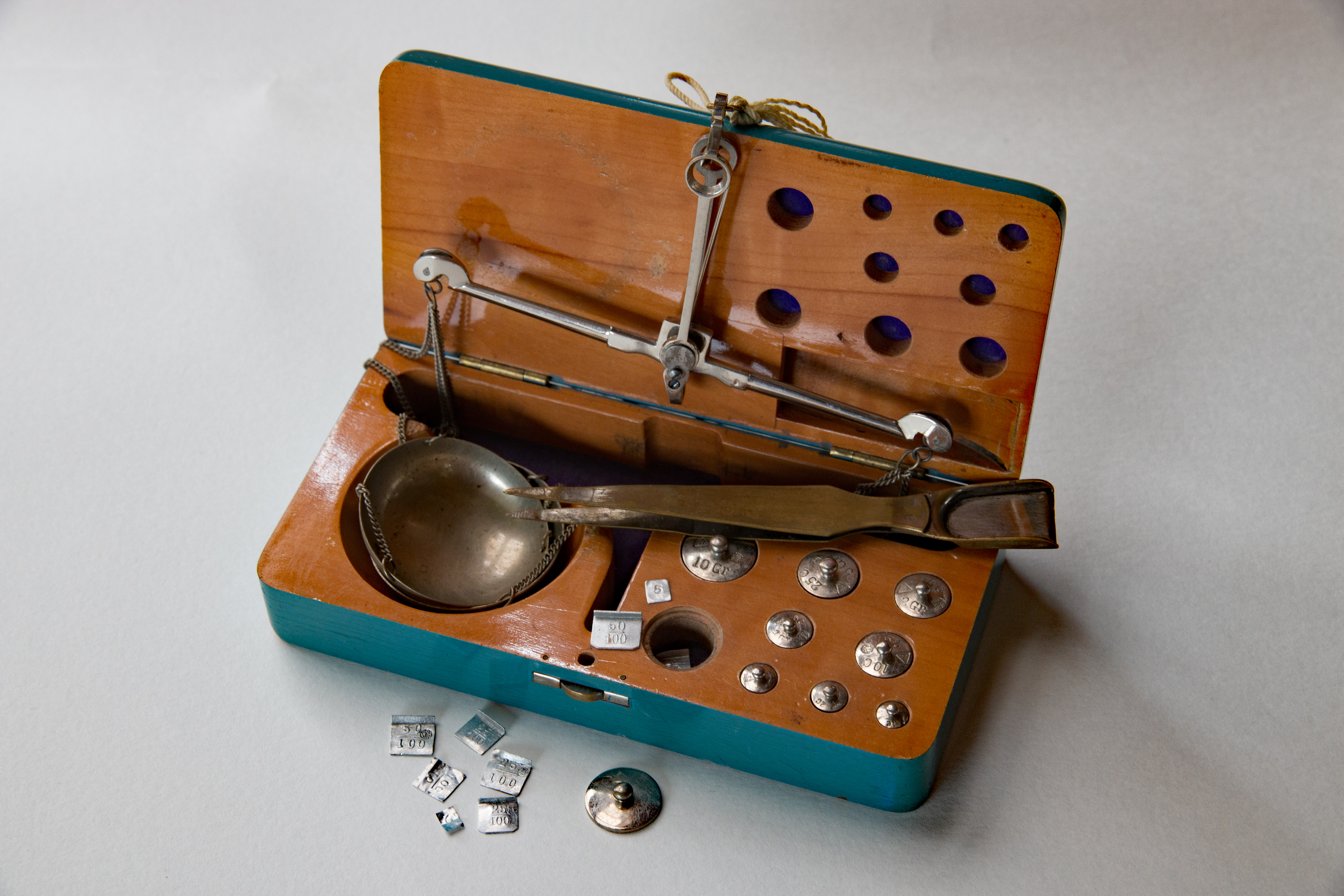
Diamond-weighing kit, with weights labelled in grams and carats

The carat (ct) is a unit of mass equal to 200 mg (0.00705 oz; 0.00643 ozt; 3.08647 gr), which is used for measuring gemstones and pearls. The current definition, sometimes known as the metric carat, was adopted in 1907 at the Fourth General Conference on Weights and Measures, and soon afterwards in many countries around the world. (Note: The United States adopted the metric carat definition on 1 July 1913, the United Kingdom on 1 April 1914.) The carat is divisible into 100 points of 2 mg. Other subdivisions, and slightly different mass values, have been used in the past in different locations.

The ANSI X.12 EDI standard abbreviation for the carat is CD.

== Etymology ==
First attested in English in the mid-fifteenth century, the word carat comes from Italian carato, which comes from Arabic (qīrāṭ; قيراط), in turn borrowed from Greek kerátion κεράτιον 'carob seed', a diminutive of keras 'horn'. It was a unit of weight, equal to 1/1728 (1/12^{3}) of a pound (see Mina (unit)).

== History ==
Carob seeds have been used throughout history to measure jewelry, because it was believed that there was little variance in their mass distribution. However, this was a factual inaccuracy, as their mass varies about as much as seeds of other species.

In the past, each country had its own carat. It was often used for weighing gold. Beginning in the 1570s, it was used to measure weights of diamonds.

=== Standardization ===
An 'international carat' of 205 milligrams was proposed in 1871 by the Syndical Chamber of Jewellers, etc., in Paris, and accepted in 1877 by the Syndical Chamber of Diamond Merchants in Paris. A metric carat of 200 milligrams is exactly one-fifth of a gram and had often been suggested in various countries, and was finally proposed by the International Committee of Weights and Measures, and unanimously accepted at the fourth sexennial General Conference of the Metric Convention held in Paris in October 1907. It was soon made compulsory by law in France, but uptake of the new carat was slower in England, where its use was allowed by the Weights and Measures (Metric System) Act of 1897.

== Historical definitions ==
Carat before 1907
Location	mg
Cyprus	187
unknown	188.6
Brazil	192.2
Egypt	195
Ambonia	197
Florence	197.2
International carat Batavia, Borneo, Leipzig	205
South Africa (1)	205.304
London-New York (1)	205.303
Spain	205.393
London-New York (2)	205.409
Berlin	205.44
Paris, East India	205.5
South Africa (2)	205.649
Amsterdam	205.7
Lisbon	205.75
Frankfurt (on Main)	205.77
Vienna	206.13
Venice	207
Madras	207.353
unknown	213
Bucharest	215
Livorno	215.99

=== UK Board of Trade ===
In the United Kingdom the original Board of Trade carat was exactly 3 1647/9691 grains (~3.170 grains = ~205 mg); (Note: The pre-1888 Board of Trade carat, of which there were exactly 151 27/64 per ounce troy, was approximately 205.4094 mg (3.169951 gr).) in 1888, the Board of Trade carat was changed to exactly 3 17/101 grains (~3.168 grains = ~205 mg). (Note: The post-1887 Board of Trade carat, of which there were exactly 151 1/2; per ounce troy, was approximately 205.3035 mg (3.168317 gr).) Despite it being a non-metric unit, a number of metric countries have used this unit for its limited range of application.

The Board of Trade carat was divisible into four diamond grains, (Note: Unlike the modern carat, the Board of Trade carat was not used for measuring pearls; those were measured with pearl grains.) but measurements were typically made in multiples of 1/64 carat.

=== Refiners' carats ===
There were also two varieties of refiners' carats once used in the United Kingdom—the pound carat and the ounce carat. (Note: The refiners' carats were the offspring of the carat as a measure of fineness for gold.) The pound troy was divisible into 24 pound carats of 240 grains troy each; the pound carat was divisible into four pound grains of 60 grains troy each; and the pound grain was divisible into four pound quarters of 15 grains troy each. Likewise, the ounce troy was divisible into 24 ounce carats of 20 grains troy each; the ounce carat was divisible into four ounce grains of 5 grains troy each; and the ounce grain was divisible into four ounce quarters of 1 1/4 grains troy each.

=== Greco-Roman ===
The solidus was also a Roman weight unit. There is literary evidence that the weight of 72 coins of the type called solidus was exactly 1 Roman pound, and that the weight of 1 solidus was 24 siliquae. The weight of a Roman pound is generally believed to have been 327.45 g or possibly up to 5 g less. Therefore, the metric equivalent of 1 siliqua was approximately 189 mg. The Greeks had a similar unit of the same value.

Gold fineness in carats comes from carats and grains of gold in a solidus of coin. The conversion rates 1 solidus = 24 carats, 1 carat = 4 grains still stand. Woolhouse's Measures, Weights and Moneys of All Nations gives gold fineness in carats of 4 grains, and silver in troy pounds of 12 troy ounces of 20 pennyweight each.
