= 2022 Jagersfontein dam collapse =

Tailings dam failure in the Free State, South Africa

- 2022 Jagersfontein dam collapse (South Africa) 2022 Jagersfontein dam collapse (Free State (South African province))
- Date: 11 September 2022
- Time: 06:00 (SAST)
- Location: Jagersfontein, Free State, South Africa; 29°46′30″S 25°25′39″E
- Cause: Structural failure
- Deaths: 5
- Injuries: Over 300
- Missing: Over 9
- Property damage: Over 100 Houses, Road and Rail Infrastructure, Water and Electricity Distribution Networks
- Displaced: Over 1000 People

The 2022 Jagersfontein Tailings Dam Collapse was a structural failure of a mine tailings dam near Jagersfontein, located in the Free State province of South Africa, resulting in a mudslide.

== Background ==
The Jagersfontein Mine is currently the deepest hand-excavated hole in the world and is known for:

- the 972 carat (194.4 g) Excelsior Diamond of 1893 and
- the 637 carat (127.4 g) Reitz Diamond of 1895.

For the duration of the mine's operational history, it was run by De Beers up to 1972, when it was deproclaimed. De Beers did however retain prospecting rights on the property until 2002.

Limited remining operations at the mine were eventually started in September 2010 by a company named Son Op before it changed its name to Jagersfontein Development. Reinet Investments of Luxembourg became involved around 2011, but eventually sold out to Stargems Group around early 2022.

A court case, De Beers Consolidated Mines Ltd v Ataqua Mining (Pty) Ltd, related to historic dumps were found not subject to the Mineral and Petroleum Resources Development Act. All standard National Environmental Management Act processes however still applied.

== Tailings Dam Collapse ==
On 11 September 2022, the dam wall collapsed due to a structural failure. About nine houses were swept away by the mudslide and more than 20 damaged. Three bodies were found buried under mud and up to 40 people been taken to hospital after sustaining injuries. Four people were confirmed missing.

At 6:00 am on 12 September 2022, Eskom was able to restore power to the town. On 12 September 2022, President Cyril Ramaphosa made a special visit to the town. On 28 September 2022, there was another collapse at the site.

In August 2025, 5 suspects, who are employed by an engineering company, faced charges of murder, malicious damage to property and contravention of the Health and Safety Act, said Zweli Mohobeleli, the spokesperson for the Directorate for Priority Crime Investigation (the Hawks) in the Free State.

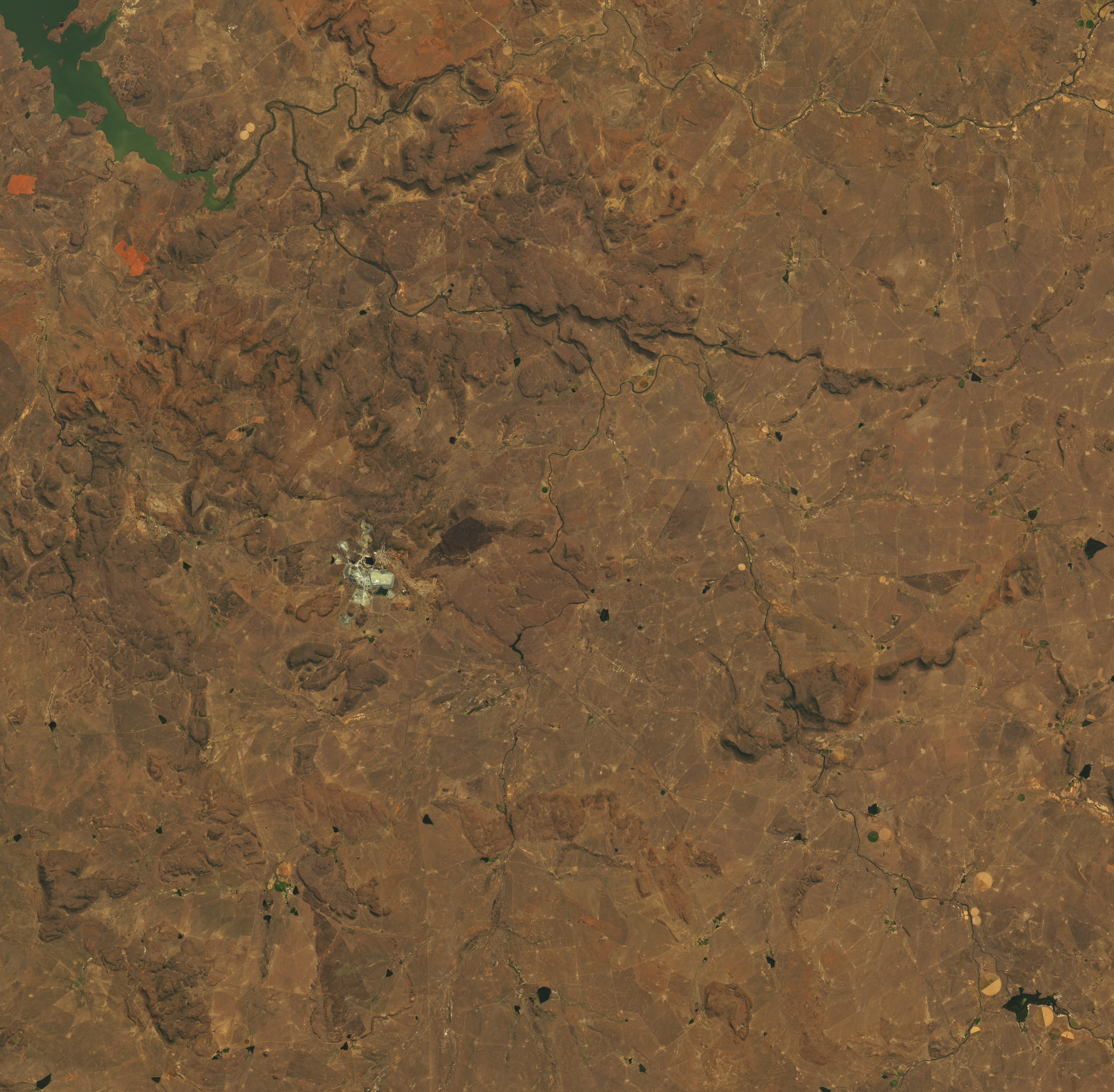
The Operational Land Imager (OLI) on Landsat 8 acquired the image on 10 September 2022, the day before the dam collapse.

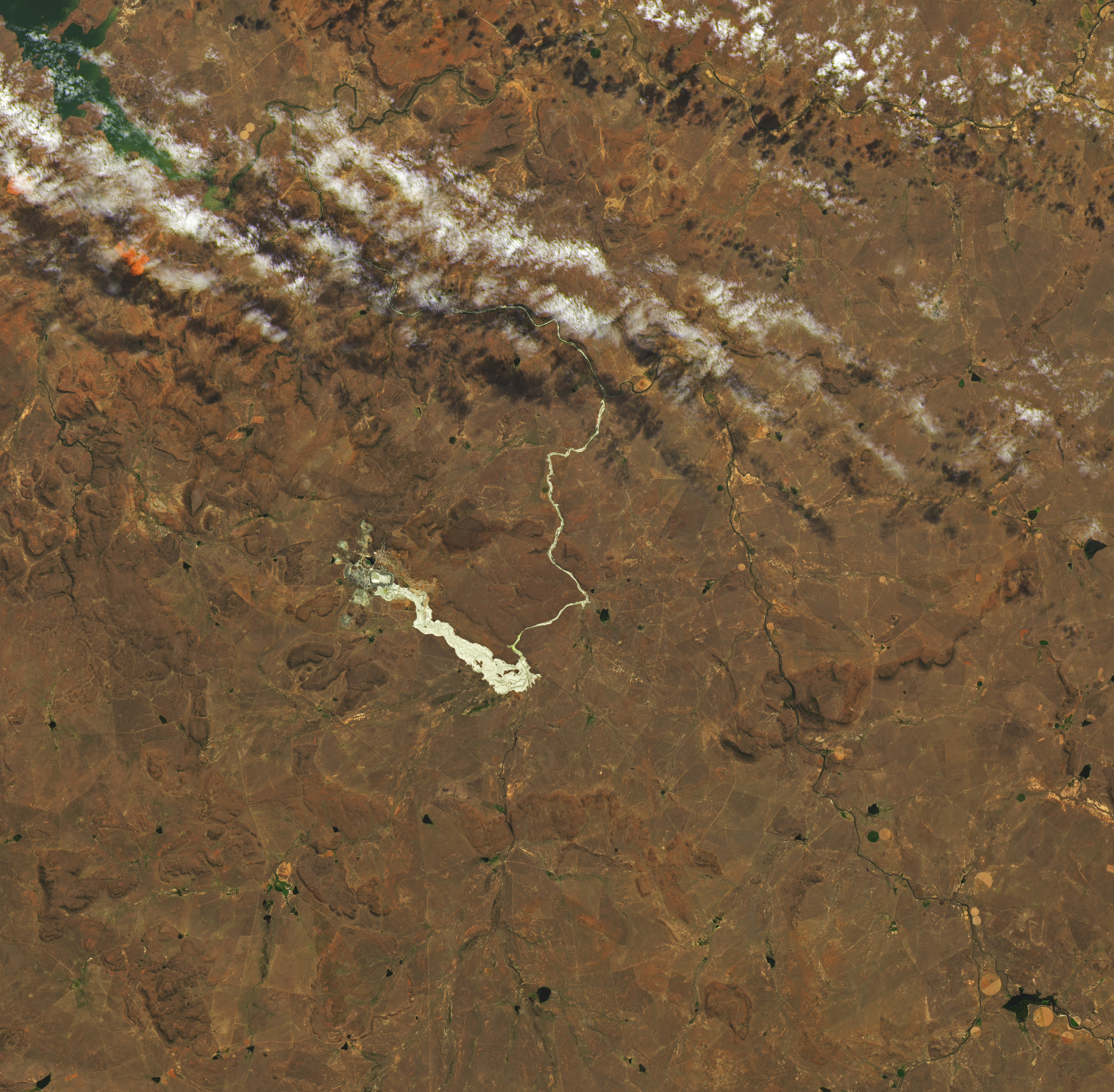
Almost one month after the collapse, satellite images show that the landscape remains altered by the coating of sludge. The Operational Land Imager-2 (OLI-2) on Landsat 9 acquired this image on 4 October 2022.

== Related Links ==
- 2025 Kafue River environmental disaster
- Merriespruit tailings dam disaster
- Piezometer Monitoring
- Tailings dam
