= Jagersfontein =

- Location within Free State (South African province) Location within South Africa
- Coordinates: 29°45′43″S 25°25′36″E
- Country: South Africa
- Province: Free State
- District: Xhariep
- Municipality: Kopanong
- Established: 1852

Government
  - Type: Municipality
  - Mayor: xolani stalin-tseletsele (ANC)

Area
  - Total: 45.5 km^{2} (17.6 sq mi)

Population (2011)
  - Total: 5,729
  - Density: 126/km^{2} (326/sq mi)

Racial makeup (2011)
  - Black African: 80.9%
  - Coloured: 12.5%
  - Indian/Asian: 0.5%
  - White: 5.6%
  - Other: 0.5%

First languages (2011)
  - Sotho: 51.8%
  - Afrikaans: 25.3%
  - Xhosa: 11.2%
  - Tswana: 6.5%
  - Other: 5.2%
- Time zone: UTC+2 (SAST)
- Postal code (street): 9974
- PO box: 9974
- Area code: 051

Jagersfontein is a small town in the Free State province of South Africa.

== Origin ==
The original farm on which the town stands was once the property of a Griqua Jacobus Jagers, hence the name Jagersfontein. He sold the farm to C.F. Visser in 1854.

== Mining ==
=== Diamond rush ===
A diamond rush started in 1870 after farmer J.J. de Klerk found a 50 carat (10 g) diamond. This was about three years before diamonds were discovered 130 km away at Kimberley.

Jagersfontein is known for many great finds, such as:

- the 972 carat (194.4 g) Excelsior Diamond of 1893 and
- the 637 carat (127.4 g) Reitz Diamond of 1895.

==== Jagersfontein Mine ====
Jagersfontein Mine together with the Koffiefontein mine produced some of the clearest diamonds of all mines in the early 1900s, despite being overshadowed by the mines at Kimberley. Streeter called Jagersfontein's diamonds of the "first water".

The Reitz diamond was first named after Francis William Reitz, then state president of the Orange Free State in which Jagersfontein is located. The following year marked the Diamond Jubilee of Queen Victoria (the 60th anniversary of her coronation) so the gem was renamed the Jubilee Diamond to commemorate the occasion.

==== Main Pit Operations ====
The Jagersfontein Mine is currently the deepest hand-excavated hole in the world.

For the duration of the mine's operational history, it was run by De Beers up to 1972, when it was deproclaimed. De Beers did however retain prospecting rights on the property until 2002.

==== Stockpile Dumps Reprocessing ====
A court case, De Beers Consolidated Mines Ltd v Ataqua Mining (Pty) Ltd, in December 2007, related to historic stockpile dumps were found not subject to the Mineral and Petroleum Resources Development Act. All standard National Environmental Management Act processes however still applied.

Limited Reprocessing operations at the mine was eventually started in September 2010 by a company named Son Op before it changed its name to Jagersfontein Development. Reinet Investments of Luxembourg became involved around 2011, but eventually sold out to Stargems Group around early 2022.

== Tailings dam collapse ==
At around 6am on Sunday 11 September 2022, parts of a tailings dam collapsed on the outskirts of Jagersfontein.

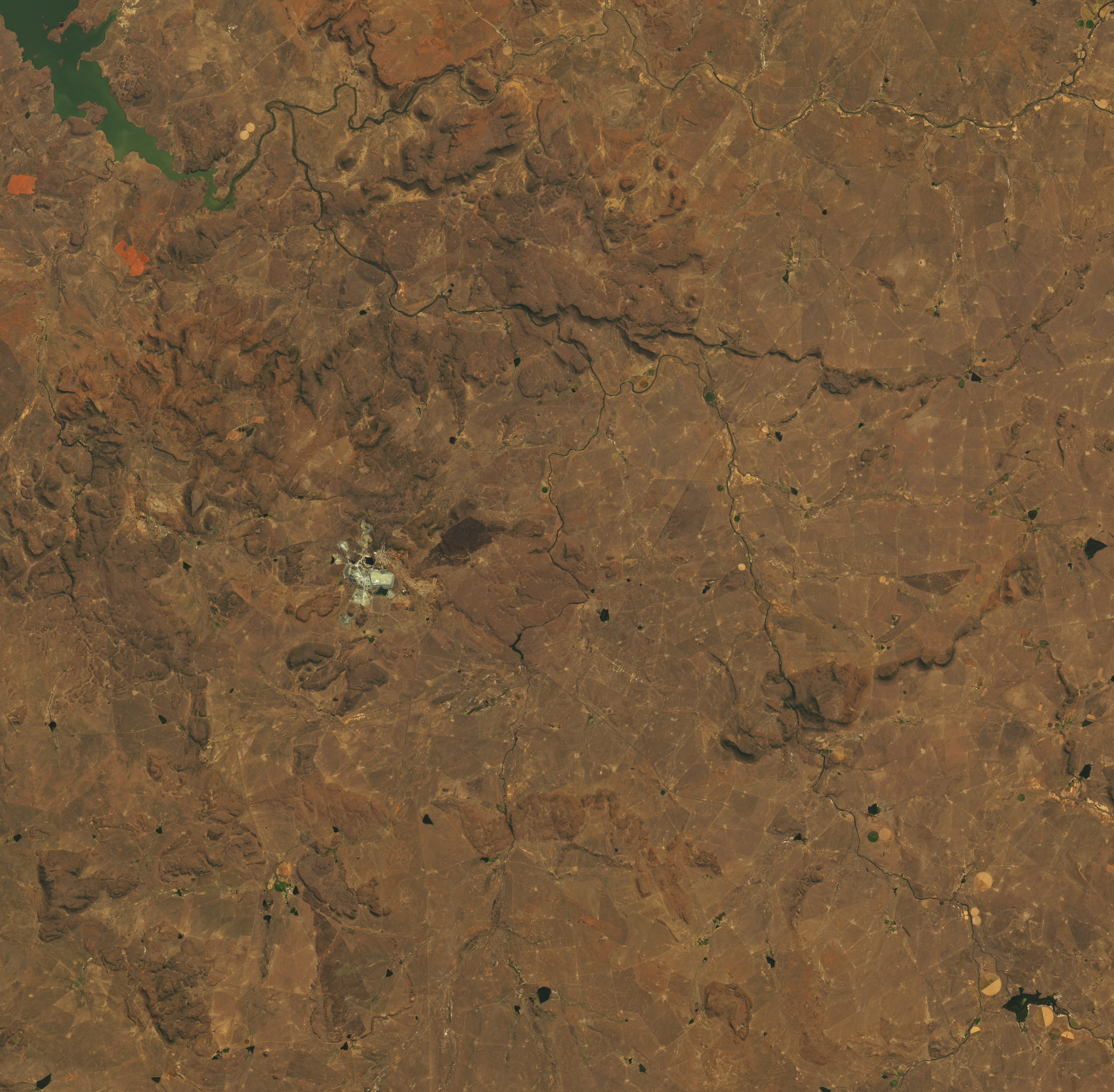
The Operational Land Imager (OLI) on Landsat 8 acquired the image on 10 September 2022, the day before the dam collapse.

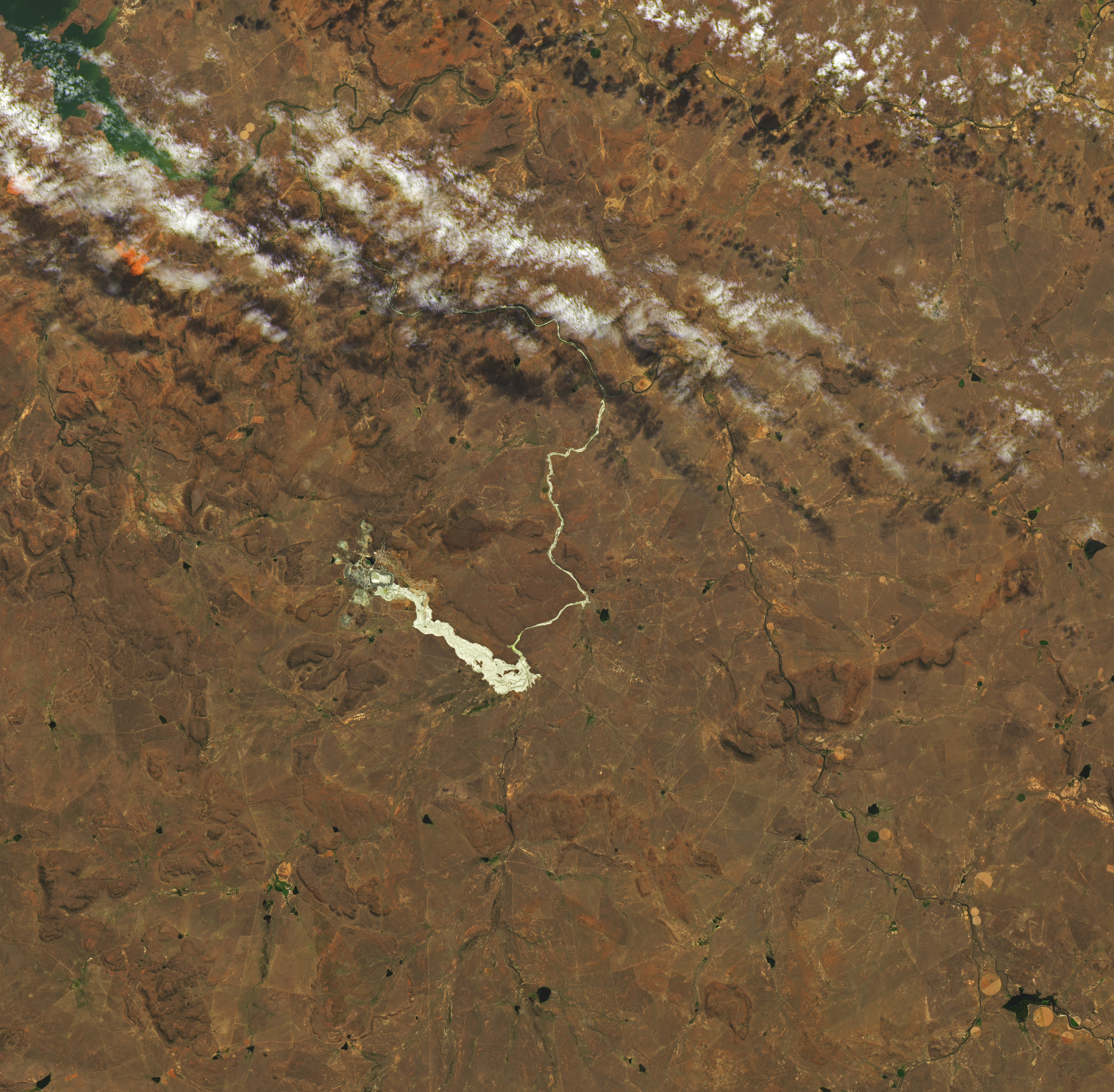
Almost one month after the collapse, satellite images show that the landscape remains altered by the coating of sludge. The Operational Land Imager-2 (OLI-2) on Landsat 9 acquired this image on 4 October 2022.

== Urban electrification ==
Jagersfontein was the second town in South Africa and the first town in the Orange Free State to have electricity and piped water.

In the early years, water used to be supplied with a unique system of coin-operated water pumps, using so-called Water Pennies, situated on street corners.

== See also ==
- Battle of Boomplaats
- 2022 Jagersfontein Dam Collapse
- De Beers
- Reinet Investments
