= Dirk de Villiers =

South African filmmaker

- Born: Dirk de Villiers; 26 July 1924; Douglas, Northern Cape
- Died: 28 December 2009 (aged 85); Chris Barnard Memorial Hospital, Cape Town
- Other name: The Godfather
- Occupations: Director, producer, writer, editor
- Years active: 1942–2004
- Spouse(s): Addy (m. 1950; div. 1973); Miems Swanepoel (partner from 1992)
- Children: 5, including Gys de Villiers

Dirk de Villiers (26 July 1924 – 28 December 2009) was a South African filmmaker. Considered one of the most prolific filmmakers and a 'Godfather' of the South African film industry, de Villiers made several critically acclaimed films during a career spanning more than six decades.

== Personal life ==
Dirk de Villiers was born on 26 July 1924 on the farm Villieria in the Douglas district, Northern Cape, in a family of six children. His mother died when he was four and his father continued farming; the family traces its farming roots to Cornelius Valkenburg de Villiers. After his mother's death Dirk and his brother Niel were raised by relatives and moved between a number of households. He later grew up on the banks of the Vaal River and attended schools in Jagersfontein, Marquard and Bethlehem.

He married actress Addy in 1950; the couple divorced in 1973. They had five children, including Gys de Villiers, who is also an actor and playwright. From 1992 he had a relationship with Miems Swanepoel.

On 24 December 2009 he suffered a heart attack and was admitted to Chris Barnard Memorial Hospital in Cape Town. He died on 28 December 2009, aged 85, of a lung infection and heart failure.

== Career ==
De Villiers began acting in 1942 with the Johannesburg Afrikaans Amateur Actors (JAATS). He co-founded the National Theater Organization with Schalk Theron. While active in drama he studied mechanical engineering and worked in the Cape Town harbour; he later took a course in marine engineering in London and worked as a ship engineer.

He started his film career as an actor in Kruger Millions, directed by Ivan Hall, playing a member of a cavalry commando. He acted in several Afrikaans films including Piet my Niggie, Kniediep, Kruger miljoene and Stadig oor die klippe. His directorial debut was the feature film Jy Is My Liefling, which launched the film career of Franz Marx and featured Min Shaw. After its commercial success he directed further popular films, including the adaptation Die Geheim Van Nantes (from the Springbok Radio serial). In 1968 he made the full-length film You Are My Darling and established himself as a professional filmmaker.

In 1972 he directed the thriller My Broer Se Bril. Subsequent films include Met Liefde Van Adele and The Virgin Goddess (both 1974). In 1976 he released Glenda and Die diamantjagters which gained international attention. His 1978 film Besluit om te sterf addressed euthanasia. De Villiers also founded the Roodepoort Amateur Theater Organization (RATO). Notable feature films include Geheim van Nantes, Kalahari Harry, Die Spaanse Vlieg, My broer se bril, Tant Ralie se losieshuis, Die lewe sonder jou, Die drie Van der Merwes, Met liefde van Adéle, My naam is Dingetjie, and others.

De Villiers produced several popular television serials such as Arende, Meeulanders and Jantjie kom huis toe; the latter is often cited as one of the first South African TV series with a brown cast. In 1990 he won the Artes Award for Best Director of a Dramatic Work for Arende, which also won additional Artes Awards and was later distributed internationally as Cape Rebel in 52 countries. He directed two sequels to the series.

He also directed English-language works including The Snake Dancer, based on the life of stripper Glenda Kemp (who played the lead), That English Woman (an account of Emily Hobhouse), and Abashokobezi, about a black physician returning to his homeland after qualifying abroad.

In 2008 de Villiers was honoured at the Klein Karoo Arts Festival for his contribution to South African film. Over his career he made around 25 feature films and 13 documentaries. In 2010 he was posthumously recognised by the South African Film and Television Industry (Safta) for his lifetime contribution to South African cinema.

== Filmography ==
Year	Film	Role	Genre	Ref.
1963	Huis op Horings	Actor: Manie	Film	
1964	Piet my Niggie	Actor: Hendrik Tallerman	Film	
1966	Kavaliers	Actor: Gen. de Wet	Film	
1967	Kruger Miljoene	Actor: van der Lindt	Film	
1967	The Cape Town Affair	Actor: Officer at security briefing	Film	
1967	Hoor My Lied	Actor: Former patient of Dawid	Film	
1968	Jy is My Liefling	Director, writer, Actor: van der Merwe	Film	
1969	Geheim van Nantes	Director, screenplay	Film	
1969	Stadig oor die Klippe	Actor: Bosman	Film	
1970	Die 3 v.d. Merwes	Director	Film	
1971	A New Life	Director	Film	
1972	Die Lewe Sonder Jou	Director, writer, Actor: Martin	Film	
1972	My Broer se Bril	Director, writer	Film	
1973	Die Wit Sluier	Director, screenplay, Actor: Dr. Fritz	Film	
1974	Pens en Pootjies	Director, executive producer	Film	
1974	La diosa virgen	Director, producer, writer, Actor: Flint	Film	
1974	Tant Ralie se Losieshuis	Director, Actor: Tommy	Film	
1974	Met Liefde van Adéle	Director, producer, story, screenplay	Film	
1975	My Naam is Dingetjie	Director, Actor: Mr. Roberts	Film	
1975	The Kingfisher Caper	Director, Actor: Les	Film	
1975	Daan en Doors Oppie Dieggins	Director, story, screenplay, Actor: Rival digger	Film	
1976	Snake Dancer	Director, producer	Film	
1977	Die Ryk Weduwee	Director	TV series	
1977	Crazy People: 'n Mal Mensdom	Director, Actor: Afrikaans narrator	Film	
1977	Dingetjie & Idi	Director, producer	Film	
1978	Die Spaanse Vlieg	Director	Film	
1978	Decision to Die	Director	Film	
1978	Witblits & Peach Brandy	Director, screenplay	Film	
1979	Charlie Word 'n Ster	Director, screenplay	Film	
1979	Herfsland	Actor: Senator Gideon Scheepers	TV series	
1980	Nie Vanweë die Duisternis	Actor	TV series	
1980	April 1980	Actor: Gaffie Krige	TV series	
1981	Interster	Producer	TV series	
1984	Jantjie	Director	TV series	
1986	Suidpunt-Hotel	Director	TV series	
1986	You Gotta Be Crazy!	Director, Actor: Himself	TV series	
1986	Ou Grote	Director	TV series	
1986	Abashokobezi	Director	TV series	
1989	Cape Rebel	Director, producer	TV series	
1990	That Englishwoman: An Account of the Life of Emily Hobhouse	Director, producer	Film	
1991	Die Allemans	Producer	TV series	
1992	Arende II: MoordenaarsKaroo	Director, producer	TV series	
1993	Arende III: Dorsland	Director, producer, Actor: Crazy man	TV series	
1994	Kalahari Harry	Director, producer, screenplay	Film	
1994	Arende	Director	Film	
1996	Meeulanders	Producer	TV movie	
1997	Kaalgat Tussen die Daisies	Producer, Actor: Kowus Pelzer	TV series	
1999	Hunt for the Man in the Moon	Producer	TV series	
2001	Lied van die Lappop	Director, producer	TV series	
