= Jagersfontein Mine =

Open-pit diamond mine in South Africa

- Location within South Africa
- Location: Jagersfontein, Free State, South Africa; 29°45′55″S 25°25′8″E
- Products: Diamonds
- Greatest depth: 200 metres (660 ft)
- Opened: 1870
- Closed: 2002

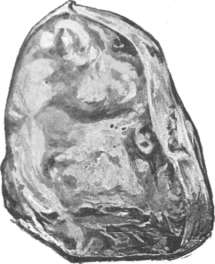
The 972 carats (194.4 g) Excelsior diamond, the largest found at the Jagersfontein Mine.

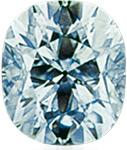
The sixth-largest diamond in the world, the Jubilee, found at the Jagersfontein Mine.

Jagersfontein Mine /ˌjeɪɡərzˈfɒnteɪn/ was an open-pit mine in South Africa, located close to the town of Jagersfontein and about 110 kilometres (68 miles) south-west of Bloemfontein. Since it was first established, two of the ten biggest diamonds ever discovered, the Excelsior and the Reitz (now called the Jubilee), were mined from Jagersfontein. The term "Jagers" has since been coined to denote the distinctive faint bluish tint of the gems from this mine. Among geologists, Jagersfontein is known as a kimberlite pipe, and a prime locality for mantle xenoliths, some of which are believed to have come from depths of 300–500 km (190–310 mi).

It is the biggest hand-excavated hole in the world at 19.65 hectares (48.6 acres), slightly larger than the Big Hole of 17 ha (42 acres) in Kimberley, which had previously claimed the title.

== Early history ==
The mine was discovered in 1870. The first diamond, a stone of 50 carats, was found by farmer J.J. de Klerk in August of that year, and digging immediately began, starting a diamond rush. The discovery a few weeks later of the much richer mines at Bultfontein and Du Toits Pan, followed by the great finds at De Beers and Colesberg Kop (Kimberley) caused Jagersfontein to be neglected for several years. Up to 1887 the claims in the mine were held by a large number of individuals, but coincident with the efforts to amalgamate the interest in the Kimberley mines a similar movement took place at Jagersfontein, and by 1893 all the claims became the property of one company, which had a working arrangement with the De Beers corporation.

For the duration of the mine's remaining operational history, it was run by De Beers up to 1972, when it was deproclaimed. De Beers did however retain prospecting rights on the property until 2002.

== Production life ==
About 9.6 million carats (1,900 kg) of jewel-quality diamonds were extracted during the mine's century of operation, interrupted only by the two World Wars and the Great Depression. After thirty-nine years of open-pit mining, underground mining began in 1909, and continued until its eventual closure on May 28, 1971; less than a year after the centenary of the first diamond discovery in the area. Since then, an Open Mine Museum and the Jagers Mining Village have opened as tourist attractions at the site.

Research by historian Steve Lunderstedt in 2005 confirmed that the mine was the biggest hand-excavated hole in the world at 19.65 hectares (48.6 acres), slightly larger than the Big Hole of 17 ha (42 acres) in Kimberley, which had claimed the title up to then. It is probably not the deepest, though, since the final depth of the Big Hole reached 220 m (720 ft) or more. Jagersfontein was dug by hand to a depth of 200 m (660 ft) by 1911.

Currently, the mine area is closed to the public.

=== Jagersfontein riots ===
Several miners strikes or ‘riots’ occurred between 1913 and 1914 in mines Koffiefontein, Klipdam, Randfontein, Kimberley, Premier mines and Jagersfontein mines. Deaths due to shootings in Premier mines and well as Jagersfontein mines led to higher publicity than other miners strikes which occurred during that time.

The majority of the miners who worked at these mines were Basotho people who lived in then Basotholand. During their time working in the mines, they lived in hostels which had strict rules for black people which included the necessity for the possession of a pass book.

Issues that affected Sotho people and precipitated riots included: The Great Depression, a drought over South Africa which was particularly severe over Basotholand as well as the first request that the British territories be handed over to the South African Union. The most distressing of these issues was the drought as it, compounded with the economic depression, put much pressure on migrant workers to return money back home to Basotholand.

The ratio of women to men in Jagersfontein was 16:1 which was abnormal for a Free State town and as such a larger proportion of women participated in protests in Jagersfontein compared to others of its time. Nonetheless, authorities in Jagersfontein took drastic action on the women involved in the strikes including an event in March 1913 where police officials sealed off the bantu location, searched each house and demanded pass books at gun-point. Approximately 61 women were arrested, of which almost 50% were coloured.

Many Basotho people fled back to Basotholand for refuge after the shootings and brutality during the riots.

In 1914, the mining riots resulted in the deaths of 11 Basotho people.

Jagersfontein Mine together with the Koffiefontein mine produced some of the clearest diamonds of all mines in the early 1900s, despite being overshadowed by the mines at Kimberley. Streeter called Jagersfontein's diamonds of the "first water".

The Reitz diamond was first named after Francis William Reitz, then state president of the Orange Free State in which Jagersfontein is located. The following year marked the Diamond Jubilee of Queen Victoria (the 60th anniversary of her coronation) so the gem was renamed the Jubilee Diamond to commemorate the occasion.

=== Stockpile dumps reprocessing ===
A court case in December 2007, De Beers Consolidated Mines Ltd v Ataqua Mining (Pty) Ltd, related to historic stockpile dumps were found not subject to the Mineral and Petroleum Resources Development Act. All standard National Environmental Management Act processes however still applied.

Limited reprocessing operations at the mine were eventually started in September 2010 by a company named Son Op before it changed its name to Jagersfontein Development. Reinet Investments of Luxembourg became involved around 2011, but eventually sold out to Stargems Group around early 2022.

== Jagersfontein tailings dam disaster ==
On 11 September 2022 a mudslide killed three and hospitalised 40 people as well as leaving many displaced after the mine tailings dam wall failed and burst.

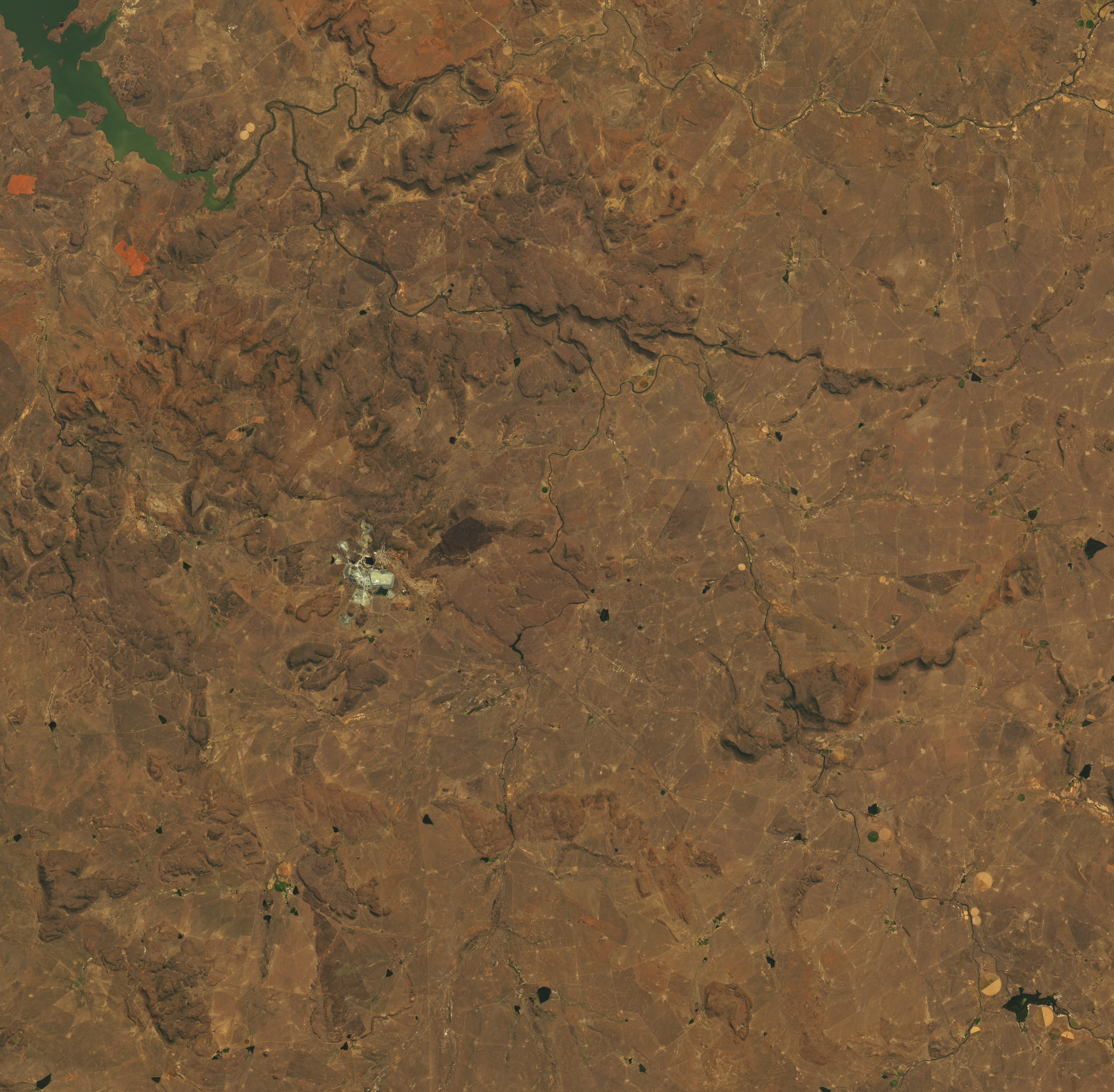
The Operational Land Imager (OLI) on Landsat 8 acquired the image on 10 September 2022, the day before the dam collapse.

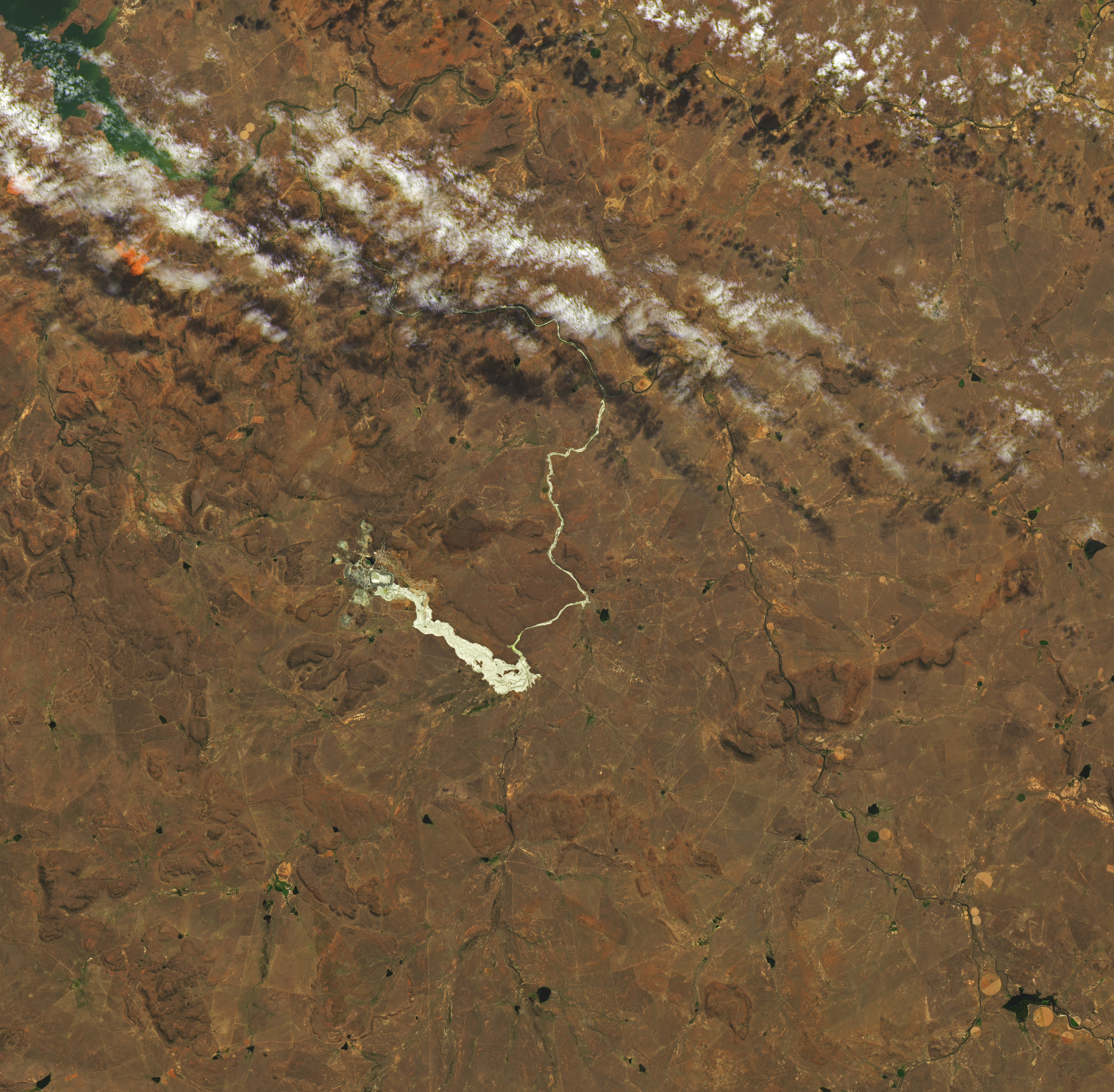
Almost one month after the collapse, satellite images show that the landscape remains altered by the coating of sludge. The Operational Land Imager-2 (OLI-2) on Landsat 9 acquired this image on 4 October 2022.
