= Glenda Kemp =

South African stripper, activist, and teacher (born 1949)

- Born: 13 May 1949 (age 77)
- Known for: Snake-related exotic dancing and counter-apartheid activism
- Website: glendakempharper.blogspot.com

Glenda Kemp (born 1949) is a South African stripper, activist, and teacher, best known for her exotic dancing sometimes featuring a succession of pythons called Oupa ("grandpa" in Afrikaans) during the 1970s. Kemp faced frequent public criticism from the conservative Apartheid government and was frequently arrested for public indecency even though she attempted to circumvent the law by offering private, invite-only dances. Kemp was named Rapport's Newsmaker of the Year in 1975. The 1976 film Snake Dancer was a semi-biographical story about her life, in which she featured.

== Early life ==
Glenda Kemp was born in the Cape Province on 13 May 1949. As a young girl, she lived in the working class suburb of La Rochelle with her mother, stepfather, and younger brother. Her two older siblings were in an orphanage in Potchefstroom; and she would later be sent there too. Kemp was fostered from the orphanage by the religious Baumbach family in the small farming town of Swartruggens.

In 1969, she enrolled into the Teachers' Training College in Potchefstroom. It was while studying that she discovered dancing; a skill which would be appreciated and detested by many in the future.

"Nothing else mattered when I was dancing. I lived for the music and the words and wanted to share this with whoever was looking at me...the main reason I took more dancing work was because of the satisfaction it was giving me in escaping my circumstances."

Kemp later transferred to the Goudstad Teachers' Training College in Johannesburg to continue dancing in go-go dancing clubs. This is also where he met her first husband, Karl Koczwara. They met at the President Hotel when she asked him for a lift back to her student housing to meet a 8pm curfew.

== Exotic dancing ==
It was during the conservative 1970s, that Kemp began stripping with "Oupa", her pet python. Her scandalous actions and her provocative moves caused the Vice Squad to do their best to stop her, without success. She was arrested on numerous occasions and charged with public indecency. Faced with barricades of Christian wives on one side and loyal fans and liberals on the other, she never gave up, but continued to provoke the attention of the public. The newspaper Rapport named her "Newsmaker of the Year".

Dancing itself was not the only way Kemp provoked the conservative public. She used various costumes, including her serpent, a devil hand puppet and stripping off a costume of bloomers, braces and a hat worn by Voortrekker women in a subversive jab towards Afrikaner nationalism. In 1973, she painted herself black, wore an afro wig and danced to drumbeats in the small, conservative Afrikaans town of Volksrust which had protested her visit.

"No one expected me to change my identity, and dance as a black woman on a white stage in the midst of apartheid laws. I was going around and kicking up dust."

In court, Kemp attempted to argue that her performances were artistic with testimony from renowned South African artist Walter Battiss.

=== Biopic ===
In 1975, South African filmmaker Dirk de Villiers pitched the idea of Snake Dancer to Kemp, off the back of her public arrests and related news stories. De Villiers later stated that "Glenda had more publicity than the Prime Minister of the country at the time." and to convince her to participate in the project, he showed her a scrapbook of articles about her that he had collected.

The full-length semi-biopic includes parts of Kemp's early life and her transition into exotic dancing. While many of the details in the film were true, the film ends with Kemp being strangled to death by her python. This dramatic, fictional ending was added by de Villiers to "placate morally uptight South African viewers", which seems to be reflected in the cautionary subtitle of the film ""Little girls shouldn't play with snakes".

There were two versions of the film, a "family fare" version for the South African audience that would adhere to local restrictions and censorship, and a longer cut for an international audience with more explicit content. Neither versions were a box office success. Local audiences were disappointed, wanting "a raunchier and more authentic experience" while international audiences didn't have as much knowledge of her story and found even the most explicit parts of the film relatively tame. While much more pornagraphic sexploitation films, such as Deep Throat had been popular in the early 1970s, by the time of release the genre had lost appeal.

The film enjoyed a slight revival with a release of a 2006 special edition DVD, with audiences interested in the historical snapshot of how a society reacts to a provocative figure and the contradictory views of desirability and what is considered "undesirable" under a strict, conservative government. As Kemp played herself, it is also the only film record of Kemp's dancing.

In 2010, Kemp was once again agreed to be involved in a new filmic depiction of her life.

== Later life ==
A few years after the publishing of Snake Dancer, Kemp planned to leave her snake and dancing behind and follow a teaching career. Her notoriety resulted in many rejections at interviews for teaching positions.

Kemp then travelled to London to continue her dancing career there. She worked for Paul Raymond (publisher) in the Raymond Revuebar and at the Windmill Theatre. She also became a relief house mother at Epworth Children's Home.

In the 1980s, Glenda put her dancing career behind her, moved back to South Africa, started a family with her then-husband, Karl Koczwara, and completed her teacher training and became a teacher. She returned to the Christian faith of her early teen years, and began a lay ministry for children and the vulnerable people of society including sex workers and addicts. She now lives in Durban in retirement.

Koczwara and Kemp got married in 1982, and divorced in 1991. On 12 July 2019, Koczwara was beaten to death with a hammer in his Johannesburg home.

== In popular culture ==
- Snake Dancer, a feature-length movie of her early life was made in 1976 by Dirk de Villiers
- Bladsy 3 (Page 3), a play in Afrikaans had a run at the Klein Karoo Nasionale Kunstefees in January 2014
- Dances with Snakes, a half-hour TV documentary of her life was made in 1996 and shown on the SABC 3 TV channel.
- Glenda Kemp, a single by Spoegwolf, was released on 21 March 2014.

== See also ==
- Striptease
- Isadora Duncan (dancer strangled by scarf)
- Pens en Pootjies (film featuring Glenda Kemp)

== Notes and references ==
- Beukes, Lauren (2004). "Snake Charmer". Maverick: Extraordinary Women from South Africa's Past. Oshun. ISBN 978-1-77007-050-9.
- Dreyer, Nadine (2006). A Century of Sundays: 100 Years of Breaking News in the Sunday Times, 1906-2006. Zebra. ISBN 978-1-77007-106-3.
- Kemp-Harper, Glenda (2012). Glenda Kemp: Snake Dancer. CreateSpace Independent Publishing Platform. ISBN 978-1-4812-4404-6.
- Dumas, Marlene; Bedford, Emma (2007). Marlene Dumas: Intimate Relations. Jacana Media and Standard Bank Centre Art Gallery. ISBN 978-1-77009-381-2.
- Barnard, Rita (2000). "The Smell of Apples, Moby-Dick, and Apartheid Ideology". MFS Modern Fiction Studies. 46 (1): 207–226. doi:10.1353/mfs.2000.0001. ISSN 1080-658X. S2CID 162051676.
- Bowman, Charmel (11 October 2009). "Serpently not! says ex-stripper". Independent.
- Percy Mabandu (23 April 2014). "5 SA bad girls". City Press. Archived from the original on 29 August 2014. "In the 1970s, at the height of apartheid's Calvinist conservatism, Kemp took to the stage with a python named Oupa wrapped around her body. She became the era's most famous stripper, memorialised in a 1976 film titled Snake Dancer. These days, she is a born-again Christian with a blog called Read and Pray. In her heyday, Kemp danced in hotels to invite-only audiences to trick the law, but was arrested frequently by police, who were often front-row fans at her shows."
- "Daar's 'n slang in die gras!". Die Burger (in Afrikaans). 3 October 1996. Archived from the original on 15 September 2000. Alt URL Archived 8 May 2016 at the Wayback Machine
- "Bladsy Drie". Kalfiefees-Hermanus (in Afrikaans). Archived from the original on 8 August 2014. "In dié stuk ondersoek Elma Postma en Armand Aucamp deur die oë van die media die impak van die ikoniese ontkleedanseres, Glenda Kemp, se lewe vanaf die 70s tot die hede. Glenda het die destydse konserwatiewe regime uitgedaag in 'n tyd toe geen vrou enigiets kon uitdaag nie, met haar wingerdlatlyfie, anderwêreldse danspassies en luislang-dansmaat, Oupa. Met gedramatiseerde beeldmateriaal en nuwe onderhoude, word Suid-Afrika opnuut ontbloot."
- "Bladsy 3". ABSA KKNK. 22 January 2014. Archived from the original on 2 April 2014.
- Genevieve Louw (December 2008). "ArtHeat Project: Glenda Kemp". artheat.net. Archived from the original on 1 May 2009.
- Jenna-lea Kelland. "Glenda Kemp". Beautiful Noise Ministries. Archived from the original on 6 March 2016.
