= Gys de Villiers =

South African actor, writer and musician

- Born: Dirk Gysbert de Villiers; 4 November 1960 (age 64); Roodepoort, South Africa
- Education: Linden High School
- Alma mater: University of Cape Town
- Occupation(s): Actor, Musician, Sculptor, Writer
- Years active: 1976–present
- Spouse: Jaci Smith (m. 2006)
- Parents: Dirk de Villiers (father); Addy de Villiers (mother)

Dirk Gysbert de Villiers (born 4 November 1960), popularly known as Gys de Villiers, is a South African actor, musician, sculptor and writer. He is best known for the roles in the television soap operas Binnelanders and 7de Laan, as well as for the films; Traitors, Vehicle 19, On the Wire, and Inside Out.

== Personal life ==
Gys de Villiers was born on 4 November 1960 in Roodepoort, South Africa as the youngest of five siblings. His father Dirk de Villiers was a popular film director. His mother Addy de Villiers is also a popular actress. He matriculated at Linden High School in Johannesburg. In 1980, he enrolled to a bachelor's degree in drama at the University of Cape Town, but ended after one-year course. Gys's eldest brother Valken died in a plane crash.

He is married to Jaci Smith, where the wedding was celebrated on 1 July 2006. After the marriage, they lived in Linden, but then moved to Westdene in Johannesburg. Then they moved to Knysna for seven years, and finally returned to Johannesburg. After his fiftieth birthday, they applied for residency rights and work permits to work in New York, USA. On 29 March 2015, they flew to New York, after obtaining green cards.

== Career ==
During his high school life, he was a member of two music groups, "The Three Slap Chips" and "Bronco". In 1978, he joined military service in Kimberley and later shifted to Windhoek in 1979. During his life in Windhoek, he started acting career in theater, when he played a small role in stage play The Three Van der Walts. After graduation from University of Cape Town, he became a professional actor. In 1983 and 1984 he joined with the Transvaal Council for the Performing Arts (TRUK) as a full-time actor. Along with Marius Weyers, they established the PotPourri Festival. In the meantime, he produced the one-man stage play titled The Spinner which was written by Christo Leach. In 1985, Gys and Christo produced the play Die Spinner at the Market Theater. For this play, Gys won the AA Vita and DALRO awards as Best actor for the Afrikaans play.

After the play, he performed regularly at the Market Theater for the stage plays such as; Sing Jy Van Bomme, Deep Ground, Night General and Flight. In 1980s, he worked as the bass guitarist of the progressive rock band "Koos". In the meantime, he held an exhibition of his sculptures. Meanwhile, he continued to work for theatre for ten years. In 1993, he started television dramas such as; Arende, Die vierde kabinet, Donkerland, Malan en Kie. His first major television role came in 1993, in the serial Triptiek and played the role "Barry McGregor".

In 1984, he made his film debut with Maneuvers directed by Regardt van den Bergh. Then he acted in many films of various genre such as; City of blood, The Stick, On the wire, Dangerous ground, Tarzan and the lost city, Desert diners, Inside out, Bare hole between the daisies, Boetie goes to the border!, Paljas, Zoop in Africa, Durban poison, Praying Mantis, The Long Walk to Freedom, Jimmy in Pink and Traitors.

He also acted in the stage play The Businessman of Venice, where he received the Johannesburg City Theater Award for Best Actor in a Supporting Role. Apart from that, he also performed in the plays: Psychedelic Cowboy and Sister Nun, Imbumba, Seer in the Suburbs, Wood for the trees and Out of the blue. In 2009, he participated in the reality show Survivor SA: Santa Carolina and was able to won a Volvo car and finished in 6th place.

== Author work ==
In collaboration with his wife Jaci, Gys wrote the book The Cabarets Suig and Die Afrikaner. The book also won the Anglogold Crucible Prize for Best New Afrikaans stage text and then won the Beeld Plus Aartvark Prize for innovative work at the Aardklop Festival in 2003. The book was also nominated for two Naledi prizes in 2005. In 2013, he translated the drama about military service, White men with weapons by Greig Coetzee.
