= Arende (film) =

1994 South African drama film

- Directed by: Dirk de Villiers
- Written by: Paul C. Venter
- Starring: Ian Roberts; Gavin van den Berg; Diane Wilson; Keith Grenville; Percy Sieff
- Cinematography: Jakes de Villiers
- Edited by: Thys de Wit
- Music by: Louis van Rensburg
- Distributed by: C-Films
- Release date: 1994 (South Africa)
- Running time: 101 min.
- Country: South Africa
- Languages: Afrikaans; English; Dutch

Arende is a 1994 South African action war film directed by Dirk de Villiers. The film stars Ian Roberts and Gavin van den Berg in lead roles along with Diane Wilson, Keith Grenville and Percy Sieff in supportive roles. It is a continuation of the Arende TV series that preceded it.

The film received positive reviews and won several awards at international film festivals.

== Plot ==
The film is set during the Anglo–Boer War. It depicts the life of the rebellious Boer farmer Sloet Steenkamp and the Captain of the British Army James Kerwin.

The film follows Sloet Steenkamp after his subsequent capture by the British. Sloet is originally sentenced to execution for treason, due to his past as a British citizen originally from the Cape Colony that joined the war on the Boer side; his execution is commuted to life imprisonment on Saint Helena Island. This highly motivates him to escape as, unlike the other prisoners who will be released after the war, he instead expects to remain imprisoned. The film details his ultimately unsuccessful attempts at escaping the island. It ends with the death of two fellow inmates and the attempted kidnapping of the island's governor to demand better medical care, and a race with Captain Kerwin that ends in the death of another Boer prisoner – and friend of Sloet's – just as the end of the Boer War is announced.

== Cast ==
- Ian Roberts as Sloet Steenkamp
- Gavin van den Berg as Capt. James Kerwin
- Brian O'Shaughnessy as Sgt. Stewart
- James White as Dr. John Moston-Smythe
- Keith Grenville as Governor Andrew Wilks
- Diane Wilson as Mary Wilks
- Jocelyn Broderick as Jo-Ann Wilks
- Michelle Botes as Princess Gobbler
- Percy Sieff as Benny Mentz
- Johan Esterhuizen as Buks Retief
- Libby Daniels as Annette Steenkamp
- André Roodtman as P.J. Buys
- Hennie Oosthuizen as Commandant Hendrik Keet
- Limpie Basson as Petrus Johnson
- Flip Theron as Rev. Louw
- Albert Maritz as Rev. Bloemfontein
- Gert van Niekerk as Paul Johnson
- Chipi van der Merwe as Kortgiel Mostert
- Kobus Steyn as Chris Marneweck
- Lourens Potgieter as Danie
- David Pieters as Sam Gobbler
- Pieter Sherriff as Faan
- Tim Mahoney as Jimmy Kitchener
- Richard Farmer as Rev. Patrick Swindle
- Gordon van Rooyen as Col. Miller
- Nico de Beer as Mees Mouton
