= Traitors (2013 film) =

- Directed by: Paul Eilers
- Release dates: January 1, 2013
- Running time: +122 minutes
- Country: South Africa
- Language: Afrikaans

Verraaiers (English: Traitors) is an Afrikaans language South African film that was released in 2013. It describes what happened during the Boer war.

Paul Eilers is the director of movie. Gys de Villiers, Vilje Maritz and Andrew Thompson play the leading roles.

== Synopsis ==
A Boer officer, decide to return home to protect his family instead of continuing to fight in the war. This decision results in him and his sons being tried for treason. Also, the myth of the "Praying Mantis Bug" (Afrikaans: "Bidsprinkaan" / "Hotnotsgod") is used in the movie as a sign of salvation. According to local beliefs, this insect brings good luck. The ending of the movie is impressive.

== See also ==
- Boers
- Afrikaners

== Bibliography ==
- Verraaiers (Traitors), Spling, Access date: 16 May 2022
- South African filmmaking at its most profound, Bizcommunity, Daniel Dercksen, 22 February 2013
- Challenging the Mythical Boer Hero Archetype in Anglo-Boer War Short Films, Anna-Marie Jansen van Vuuren University of Johannesburg, South Africa, IAFOR Journal of Cultural Studies Volume 3 – Issue 2 – Autumn 2018
