= Koffiefontein mine =

Diamond mine in the Free State, South Africa

Coordinates: 29°25′07″S 24°59′36″E

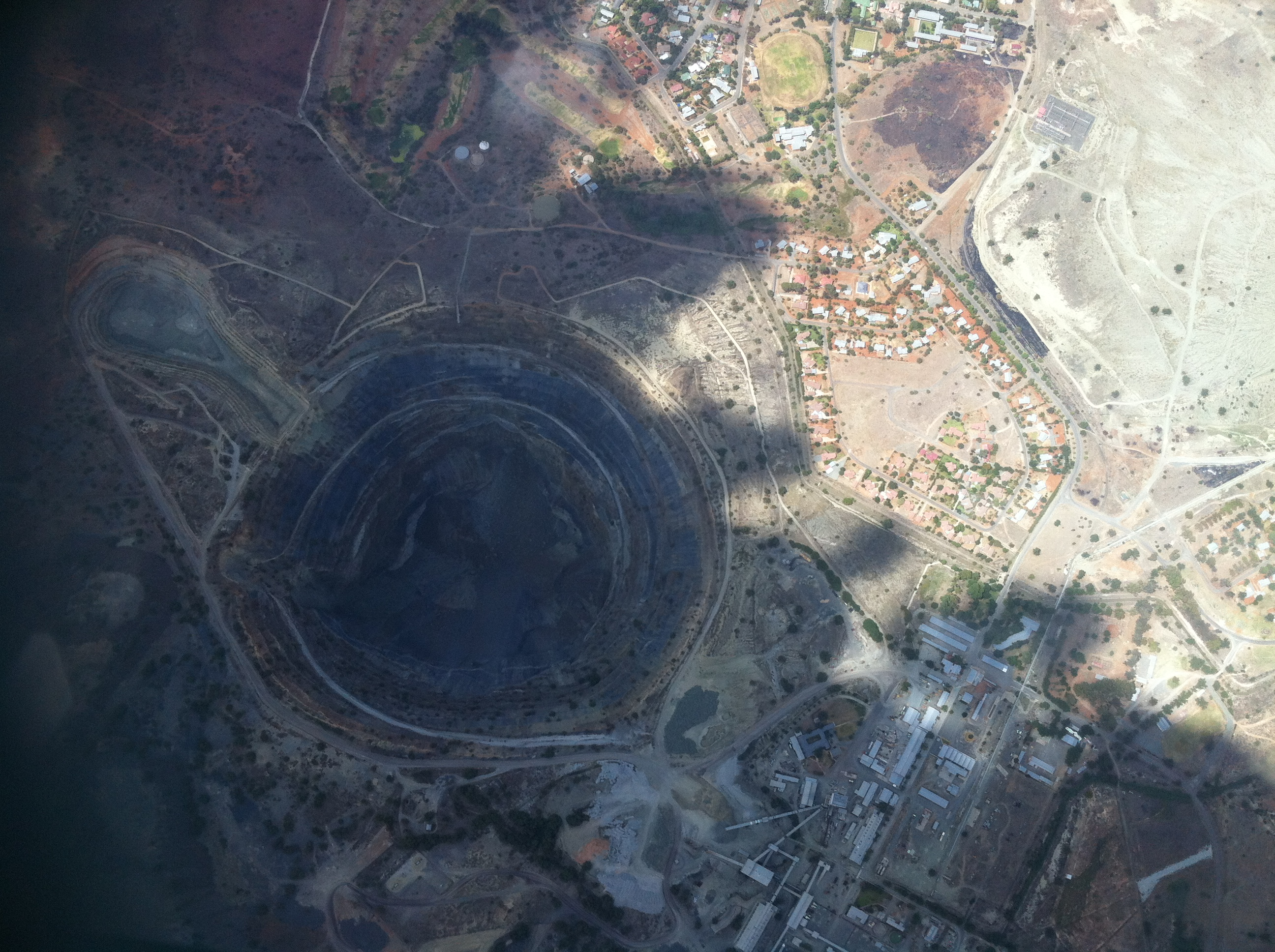
Koffiefontein Diamond Mine from the air, 2012

Koffiefontein Diamond Mine is a diamond mine situated in the Free State province, about 80 km from Kimberley, South Africa. It is one of the many Kimberley mines of which Kimberley mine, de Beers mine, Dutoitspan, Bultfontein and Wesselton are its more famous neighbours.

The mine was opened in 1870 and consisted of 1200 claims and worked at a large scale in the beginning of the century. However several sources quote it to have a poor yield: 4 to 5 carat (800 to 1000 mg) in 100 loads and according to Streeter the mines were not profitable at all by the end of the 19th century. Streeter also noted that in particular the diamonds of the Koffiefontein and Jagersfontein were of the "first water"; meaning of very good clarity.

There was little on the surface to mark the position of these deposits, some deposits were slightly raised above the surface, some showed a small depression, and it was only after mining started that the extent of the deposits became clear.

The mine has been closed several times in its history and never became a large production site. The total production of the mine was 7.3 million carats (1460 kg), and the largest gem weighed 139 carats (27.8 g). The mine was most recently reopened in 1987 however De Beers announced its final closure in January 2006.

In November 2006 Petra announced it was in advanced talks with De Beers to take over the mine.

== History ==
Diamonds were discovered on the Koffiefontein Diamond Mine in 1870. One thousand two hundred and forty three claims were laid out at Koffiefontein in 1878 and by the early 1980s, several companies were operating at the kimberlite pipe. In 1893 Alfred Mosely brought forward numerous claims and formed The Koffyfontein Mines Ltd. This company's headquarters were located in London, England. James West was appointed as the first manager and was later succeeded by Walter Stanley Whitworth in 1896. Whitworth was a qualified civil engineer and was only meant to stay in Koffiefontein for two years while constructing the railways however, he became an influential figure and remained in Koffiefontein for over 60 years. Whitworth released a weekly letter about the Koffyfontein mine to London for approximately forty years. In 1911 DE Beers bought out the claims at the mine and remained the owners until 2006. In 2007, Petra Diamonds bought the Koffiefontein Mine from De Beers and are currently still the owners and in operation.

== Description ==
The mining area consists of the Koffiefontein and Ebenhaezer pipes, the administration and mining buildings, the dumps, dams and old hostel buildings.

== Miners’ health ==
The majority of the black miners came from the north (the then Zuid Afrikaans Republiek) or from the Eastern Cape. They were recruited by agents in the rural areas. The miners lived in poor conditions. They had to feed themselves and had low wages. The majority had to save money to send to their families in the homelands and therefore neglected their own nutritional status. Working conditions including poor sanitation, compounded with poor nutritional intake increased their susceptibility to contracting a variety of infectious diseases such as typhoid fever, cholera and tuberculosis.

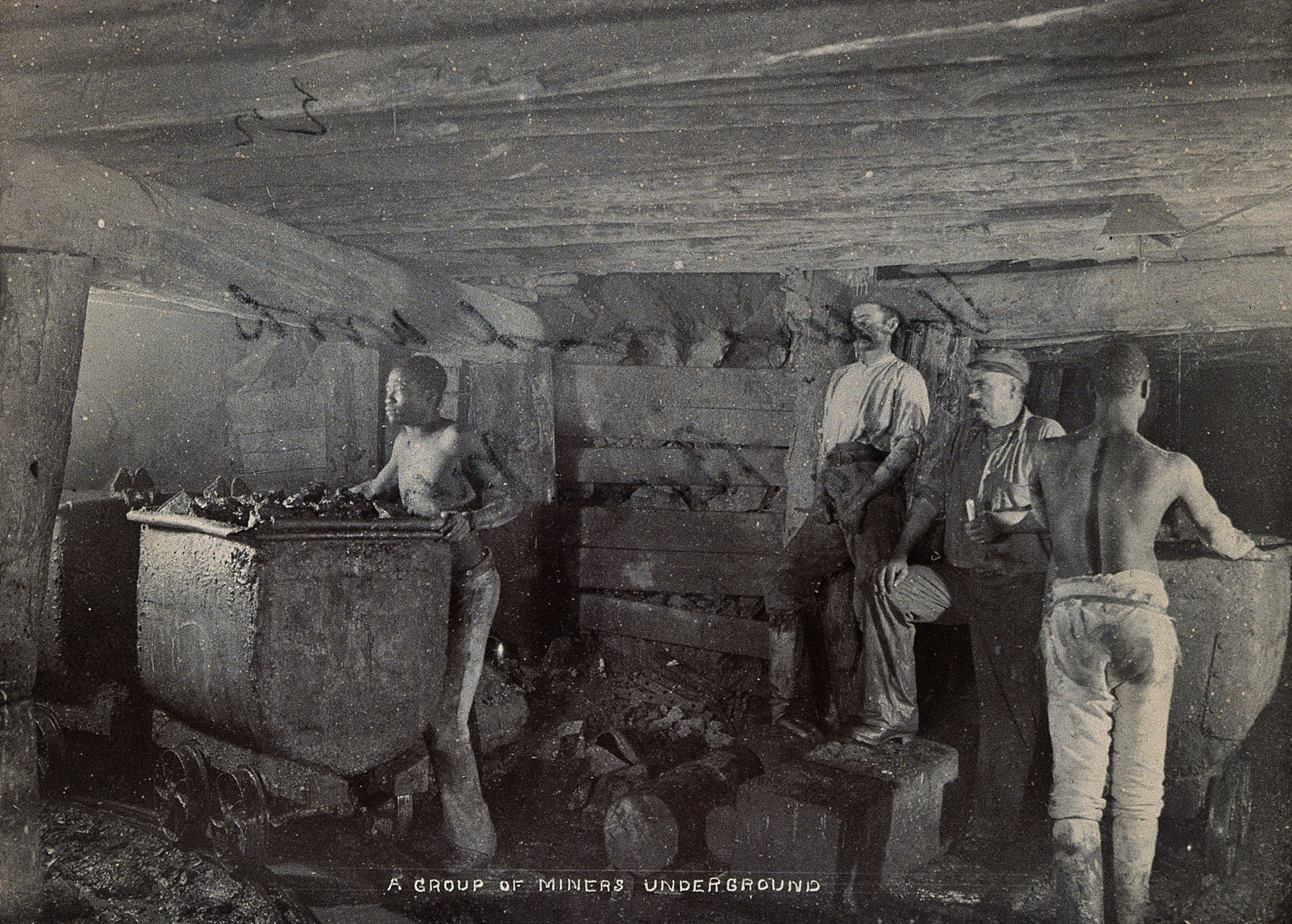
A group of miners working underground mines of the Kimberlite Pipes, De Beers diamond mine, 1896.

During February 1896, an enteric fever broke out among the workers. By the 10 May 1896, more than 200 miners had been affected by the fever and an additional 40 were hospitalized. The epidemic continued until August 1896 with approximately seven individuals dying weekly. On one day, (according to Whitworth's letters) approximately 30 deaths occurred. Owing to the overwhelming requirement for graves, numerous dead miners were buried in very shallow graves which were covered a few days later by tailings from the washers' gears. The burial of these bodies was confirmed by the Secretary of the London and Orange Free State Exploration Company Ltd in a letter dated 20 May 1896 to the Orange Free State government. The letter requested the government to stop The Koffyfontein Mines Ltd burying their workers in mine tailings.

Deaths were initially diagnosed as pneumonia and an enteric fever which originated from a contaminated drinking water reservoir at the town. On the 31 May 1896, the mine doctor reported five deaths due to chicken pox. At the beginning of July 1896, 200 new workers started working at the Koffiefontein mine of which 96 fell ill and two died. The miners were later diagnosed with Typhoid fever which is associated with poor sanitation.

The mining hospital was filled with patients, with particularly high mortality rates among the black mine workers.

Owing to the working conditions and effects of the Typhoid epidemic, there grew a dissatisfaction among the miners which resulted in an attempt by the miners to escape the living compounds. One of the mineworkers was shot in a riot and later died from his wounds.

== Grave site ==
In 2001, during operations to rework earlier mine dumps undertaken by archeologist Zoe Henderson, three skeletons were discovered at the Koffiefontein Diamond Mine in the Free State province of South Africa. As per legislation, an archaeologist was called in to remove the skeletons. As the work commenced, it became apparent that these skeletons were located at the edge of a graveyard. After thirty-six skeletons were removed, the mine decided to cease operations and leave the rest of the graveyard intact.

The graves of miners were uncovered in the oldest mine dump in Koffiefontein. This dump is called the Whitworth Dump and is located on the east of the open mine. The dump is composed of only 'yellow ground' which is the decayed kimberlite found in the top 21 meters of the pipe. It was mined until 1902 to reach the underlying blue ground. The graves were found several meters from the current surface level around the dump; however, it is not possible to determine how deep the graves were in relation to the original land surface.

=== Grave description ===
There are five rows of graves which are poorly aligned. The unexcavated portion of the graveyard continues in an easterly direction towards the edge of the mine dump. There was no clear patterning noted to the orientation of the skeletons in the graves. In most traditional African practices of burial, the body is wrapped in either a mat, cloak, or skin of an ox in sitting a position in the grave with knees tucked up against chest. However, skeletons at the gravesite were buried in varying positions. A double grave was also noted, where two individuals were buried in one grave site.

Skeletons had been wrapped in either plain hessian alone or hessian stained red, while only a few were wrapped in both. Some graves were wrapped in blankets.

Cultural material found in the graves included buttons, metal arm bangles, iron leg bangles, coiled copper-wire bands and traditional beads around the necks.

The skeletons were predominantly male with thirty-three male and two female. One skeleton was of indeterminate gender. The average age at death was between 25 and 33 years.

== The Guard House ==
The Guard house is a structure older than 100 years and is protected under the National Heritage Resources Act (Act 25 of 1999). The house was used during the Second World War when the area was still used as an internment dump.

== Engravings ==
There are four rock engravings which are located on a rock or ‘koppie’ behind the mine managers house. Two of these engravings are at the base of the ‘koppie’ and the other two are located towards the top of the koppie. The engravings at the base of the koppie are of a black wildebeest and a warthog. The two engravings at the top of the ‘koppie’ are of eland. Rock paintings and engravings are depictions of the San people’s experiences during religious trance states.

== See also ==
- Big Hole
- Mining in South Africa
