= Spoegwolf =

South African rock band

- Origin: Paarl, South Africa
- Genre: Rock
- Years active: 2012–present
- Members: Moskou du Toit; Chris von Wielligh; Albert van der Merwe; Danie du Toit
- Website: spoegwolf.com

Spoegwolf ([ˈspuχ.vɔlf]) is an Afrikaans rock band from Paarl, South Africa, founded in 2012. The group consists of Moskou du Toit (drums, percussion) Chris von Wielligh (guitar, piano), Albert van der Merwe (bass guitar, vocals, rap), and Danie du Toit (vocals, guitar).

== History ==
The members of Spoegwolf began playing music together while they were still in high school, and they eventually named themselves Ysterkoei and won several competitions, which eventually led to a recording contract with Paris Recording Studios. In 2012, they changed their name to Spoegwolf and the same year, released their debut album, Swaartekrag.

The group followed up with Somer in 2015, which contains the song "Glenda", a reference to South African stripper, activist, and teacher Glenda Kemp. The record was named Best Alternative Album at the annual Ghoema Music Awards.

Their next album, Die Donker Toring, was released in 2017.

In 2019, Spoegwolf issued their fourth studio album, Koma. The record was well received, and the band became the first Afrikaans music group to occupy the number one spot on the Apple Music charts in South Africa. Also in 2019, the group teamed up with fellow South African rocker Francois Van Coke on "Dagdrome in Suburbia", the title track from his 2019 studio album.

2020 saw the release of two albums, See and Wind. In 2021, Spoegwolf again issued two records, both EPs: Groen and Silwer.

In 2022, the group released the albums Droombrief and Dryf.

== Trivia ==
Aside from their work with the band, brothers Danie and Moskou du Toit run their own restaurant in the town of Stellenbosch.

In conjunction with his musical work with the band, Danie has published three poetry books: Warmer Voor Die Tuimeldroer, Sterreval, and Die Tuin.

== Band members ==
- Moskou du Toit – drums, percussion
- Chris von Wielligh – guitar, piano
- Albert van der Merwe – bass guitar, vocals, rap
- Danie du Toit – vocals, piano, guitar

== Discography ==
=== Studio albums ===
- Swaartekrag (2012)
- Somer (2015)
- Die Donker Toring (2017)
- Koma (2019)
- See (2020)
- Wind (2020)
- Droombrief (2022)
- Dryf (2022)

=== EPs ===
- Elektriese Kind (2014)
- Groen (2021)
- Silwer (2021)
- Lente (2023)
- Berge (2024)
- Eindbestemming (2024)
- Water En Weerlig (2025)

=== Live albums ===
- Live Uit Sunset Recording Studios (2020)

=== Singles ===
- "Glenda Kemp" (2014)
- "Lenie Blou II" (2019)
- "Seile" (2019)
- "Heen En Weer" (2020)
- "Ek kyk na jou" (2025)
- "My Huis" (2025)
- "Hou Weer Moed (feat. Emile Swiegers)" (2025)
