= Hekro Towers =

South African skyscraper

- Interactive map of the Hekro Towers area

General information
- Location: Central Business District, Johannesburg, South Africa
- Coordinates: 26.199508°S 28.043466°E
- Opened: 1969; 57 years ago
- Owner: Universal Church of the Kingdom of God

Height
- Height: 384.47 ft (117.19 m)

Technical details
- Floor count: 30

Hekro Towers is a skyscraper in the Central Business District of Johannesburg, South Africa. Standing at an estimated 384.47 feet (117.19 metres), it is 30 storeys tall.

The building was constructed in 1969 as the President Hotel, and later operated as a Holiday Inn, before being converted to offices. It is owned by the Universal Church of the Kingdom of God, which also owns a church located next door.
