= Jubilee Diamond =

Colourless, cushion-shaped diamond weighing 245.35 carats

Jubilee
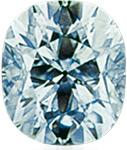
- The Jubilee Diamond
- Weight: 245.35 carats (49.070 g)
- Color: E-grade colourless
- Cut: Cushion
- Country of origin: South Africa
- Mine of origin: Jagersfontein Mine
- Discovered: 1895
- Cut by: M.B. Barends
- Original owner: Wernher, Beit & Co.; Barnato Bros.; Mosenthal Sons & Co. (consortium)
- Owner: Robert Mouawad

The Jubilee Diamond, originally known as the Reitz Diamond is a colourless, cushion-shaped diamond weighing 245.35 carats (49.07 grams), making it the sixth largest diamond in the world. It was originally named after Francis William Reitz, the then president of the Orange Free State where the stone was discovered, before being renamed to honour the 60th anniversary of the coronation of Queen Victoria in 1897.

The original stone, a rough octahedron weighing 650.80 carats (130.16 g), was discovered in 1895 at the Jagersfontein Mine in South Africa. A consortium of diamond merchants from London purchased it along with its even larger sister, the Excelsior, in 1896, and sent it to Amsterdam where it was polished by M.B. Barends. A 40 carat (8 g) chunk was removed, which itself yielded a 13.34 carat (2.668 g) pear-shaped gem eventually purchased by Carlos I of Portugal.

Dorabji Tata acquired the Jubilee Diamond around 1900 and gave it to his wife Meherbai who used to wear it during her visits to the royal courts and public functions. The Jubilee Diamond was the largest in the world until 1905 when a bigger diamond, the Cullinan I also known as the Great Star of Africa which was itself cut from an even larger rough diamond - the Cullinan Diamond, was exhibited. It was sold after his death in 1932, and the money went to the formation of the Sir Dorabji Tata Trust.

== See also ==
- List of diamonds
