= Excelsior Diamond =

Large diamond discovered in 1893

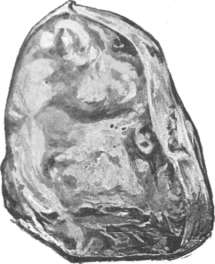
- Depiction of the Excelsior in Precious Stones and Gems (1898) by Edwin W. Streeter
- Weight: 971 3/4 carats (194.35 g) rough; 13 to 68 carats (2.6 to 13.6 g) assorted cut
- Color: G (near colorless)
- Cut: assorted (ten stones total, largest is a pear shape)
- Country of origin: South Africa
- Mine of origin: Jagersfontein Mine
- Discovered: June 30, 1893
- Cut by: Asscher
- Original owner: assorted
- Owner: assorted
- Estimated value: assorted, largest stone sold for $2,642,000 in 1996

The Excelsior Diamond is a gem-quality diamond, and was the largest known diamond in the world from the time of its discovery in 1893 until 1905, when the Cullinan Diamond was found. It was found on June 30, 1893, at the Jagersfontein Mine in South Africa, 130 kilometres (81 miles) south east of Kimberley whose fame as a diamond mining center always overshadowed that of Jagersfontein. It had a blue-white tint and weighed 971 old carats or 995.2 metric carats (or 194 g). The Excelsior rates as the fourth largest rough diamond of gem quality ever found. It was ultimately cut into ten stones weighing from 13 to 68 carats (2.6 to 13.6 g).

== Discovery ==
The Excelsior Diamond was found on June 30, 1893, at the Jagersfontein Mine in the Orange Free State, one of the South African Republics during the second half of the 19th century, by a worker in a shovelful of gravel he was loading into a truck. Instead of handing it over to his overseer, he delivered it directly to the mine manager, who rewarded him with £500 in cash and a horse equipped with a saddle and bridle. On the day of the diamond's discovery the contract between the mining company and the syndicate of firms in London which purchased its diamonds expired. This may have contributed to the fact that its discovery was not reported in any of the prestigious British newspapers, and the diamond, despite its fine quality and exceptional size, remained largely unremarked upon. It was shipped to the London offices of Messrs Wernher, Beit and Company, one of the members of the diamond buying syndicate, with the mining company retaining a 50 percent share in the ownership of the diamond. Wernher, Beit attempted to insure the diamond for £40,000, but eventually settled for £16,250.

In 1895 the Excelsior was joined by another very large diamond from the Jagersfontein Mine, first called the Reitz Diamond after the President of the Orange Free State, but soon renamed the Jubilee Diamond, in honor of Queen Victoria's Diamond Jubilee. For reasons that remain obscure, this smaller diamond weighing only 650.80 carats overshadowed the Excelsior; one reason speculated is that the Excelsior was perceived to be far too large, and of quality too superior, for any prospective buyer. The consequence was that it was sent to I. J. Asscher in Amsterdam, in 1903, to be cut into ten smaller stones.

== Rough stone ==
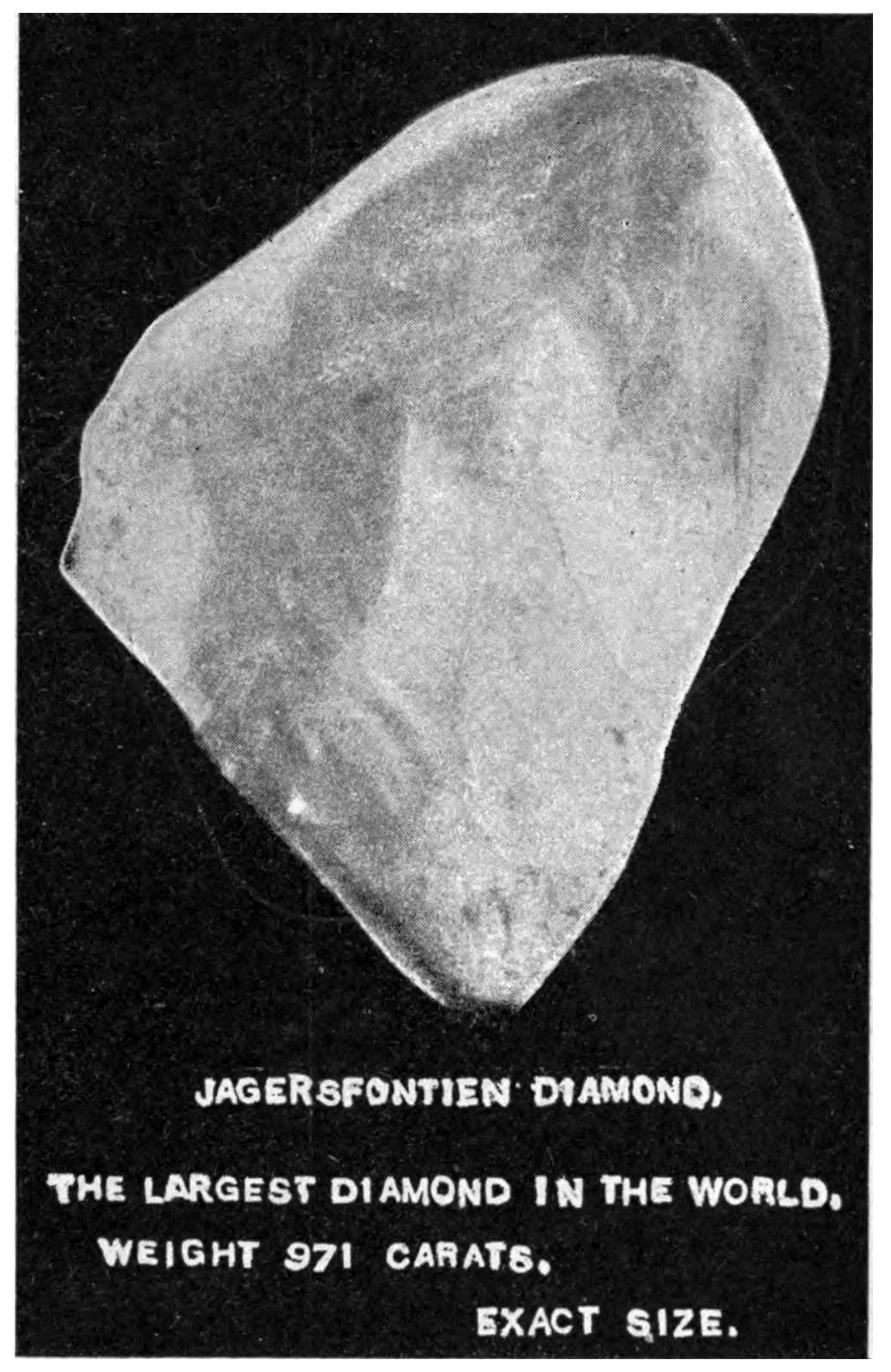
Photo depicting "...the exact size." in Mark Twain's 1897 travelogue, "Following the Equator"

The rough stone measured 971 carats in weight and was categorized as Color G. The stone was shaped like a half a loaf of bread; it was unique and inspired the name Excelsior, which means "higher". It measured 2 1/2 by 2 inches by 1 inch thick. The Excelsior was colored a stunning white with a tint of blue. It did contain a number of black carbon inclusions, which are typical of the diamonds from the Jagersfontein mine. The crystalline structure resembled a fractured icicle. From the time of its discovery on June 30, 1893, it was the largest diamond known to exist, until the discovery of the Cullinan Diamond in 1905.

== Cutting of the Excelsior ==
Finally, after the diamond sat in the vault waiting for a buyer for many years, the owners made the decision to cut the stone into several smaller stones. This decision meant that the Excelsior would never be a single large spectacular faceted stone. At the time, the manager of the De Beers diamond syndicate said that the dividing of the stone into many small pieces was "the greatest tragedy of modern times in the history of famous diamonds". In retrospect, diamond experts feel that it should have been cut to yield a single large diamond. Why it was not, remains a mystery. By contrast, the owners of the Cullinan Diamond cut that stone in such a way that the largest faceted diamond in the world came from it. The fate of the Excelsior kept it out of the Smithsonian or other historical museums. It was cut without regard to its historical significance, divided into small, easily sold assorted stones. The named pieces were:

Excelsior I	69.68 carats	pear shape
Excelsior II	47.03 carats	pear shape
Excelsior III	46.90 carats	marquise shape
Excelsior IV	40.23 carats	pear shape
Excelsior V	34.91 carats	marquise
Excelsior VI	28.61 carats	marquise
Excelsior VII	26.30 carats	pear shape
Excelsior VIII	24.31 carats	pear shape
Excelsior IX	16.78 carats	pear shape
Excelsior X	13.86 carats	pear shape
Excelsior XI	9.82 carats	pear shape

There were a further 11 smaller pieces, some only a fraction of a carat in weight. It was many years before all of the separate stones were sold.

The cut stones were parceled out and sold to several different buyers. The Excelsior I, which came up for sale in 1991 and 1996, was purchased by Robert Mouawad for $2,642,000. The remaining stones were used in various grand jewelry pieces such as extravagant tiaras and fabulous bracelets and other fine jewelry creations.

== See also ==
- List of diamonds
- List of largest rough diamonds
