= First water =

Quality rating of diamonds

In the gemstone trade, first water means "highest quality". The clarity of diamonds is assessed by their translucence; the more like water, the higher the quality. The 1753 edition of Chambers's Encyclopaedia states "The first water in Diamonds means the greatest purity and perfection of their complexion, which ought to be that of the clearest drop of water. When Diamonds fall short of this perfection, they are said to be of the second or third water, &c. till the stone may be properly called a coloured one." The phrase first water is also used more generally to refer to the highest quality or most extreme example of a person or thing, not just gemstones.

The comparison of diamonds with water dates back to at least the early 17th century, and Shakespeare alludes to it in Pericles, 1607.

... heavenly jewels which Pericles hath lost—
... The diamonds of a most praisèd water doth
appear to make the world twice rich.
