= 2025 Louvre heist =

Jewellery theft in Paris, France

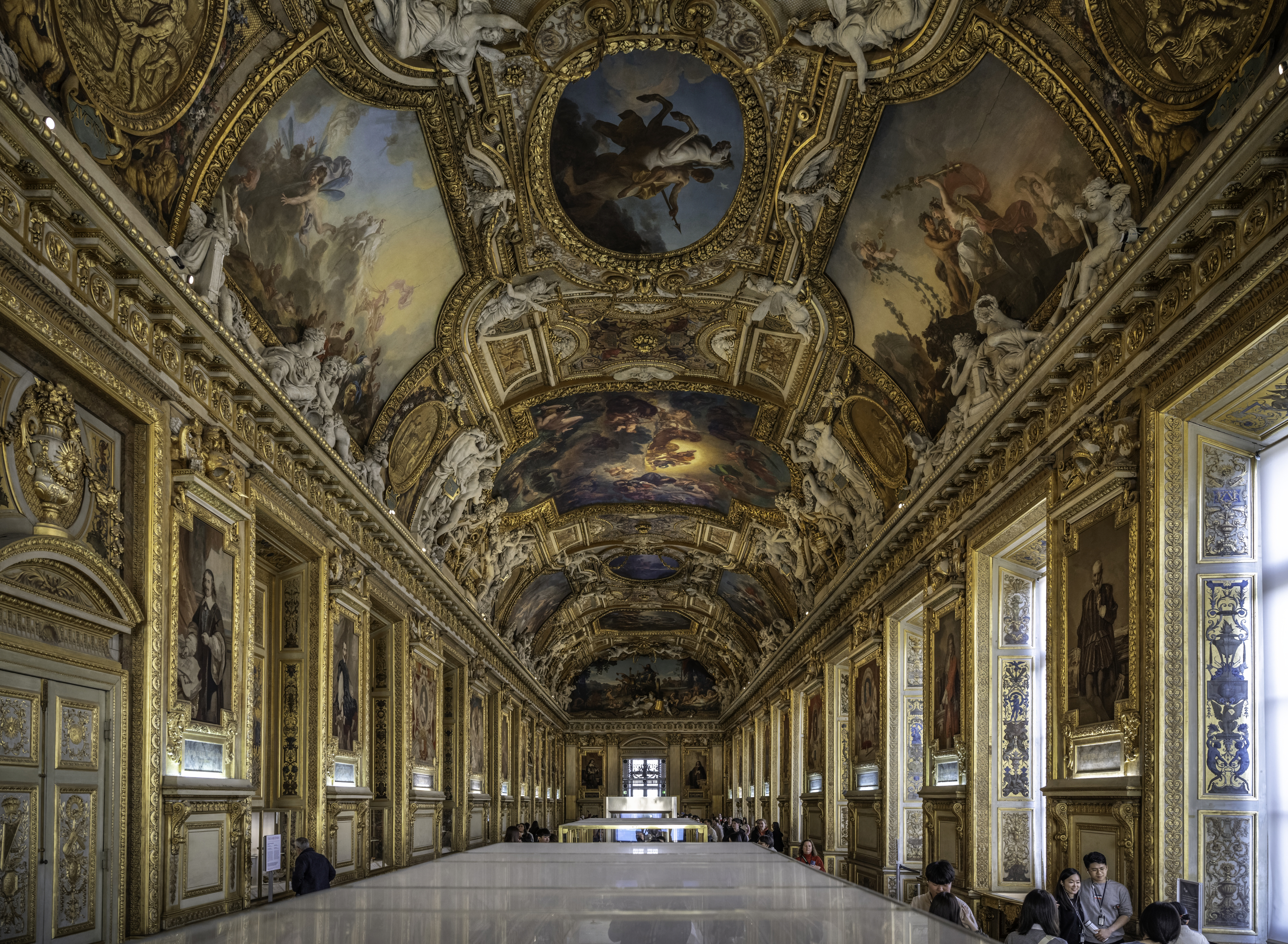
- The Galerie d'Apollon in 2024
- Date: 19 October 2025; 12 months ago
- Time: c. 09:30 (CEST)
- Venue: Louvre
- Location: Paris, France
- Type: Jewellery theft
- Stolen value: €88 million

On 19 October 2025, thieves disguised as construction workers stole eight pieces of the French Crown Jewels valued at approximately €88 million from the Galerie d'Apollon of the Louvre in Paris, France. The robbery took less than eight minutes, of which the thieves spent four in the museum itself and the rest using an elevated furniture lift to enter and exit the gallery through a window. It occurred during regular opening hours. It was the first art theft from the Louvre since the painting Le chemin de Sèvres was stolen in 1998.

Within a week, two men from Seine-Saint-Denis were arrested in connection with the robbery. Nine further suspects were detained throughout the course of the investigation, six of whom were released. Charges have been filed against five suspects; the location of the jewels remains unknown.

== Background ==
The 16th-century Galerie d'Apollon within the Louvre displayed what remained of the French Crown Jewels, including the Crown of Louis XV and the Hortensia diamond.

The first documented theft from the Louvre occurred in 1911, when Vincenzo Peruggia, a former employee of the museum, stole the Mona Lisa (recovered two years later in Italy). The most recent art theft before 2025 was in 1998, when the painting Le chemin de Sèvres by Jean-Baptiste-Camille Corot was stolen. The artwork has not yet been found; at the time, the Louvre's director, Pierre Rosenberg, warned that the museum's security was "fragile".

Laurence des Cars, director of the museum at the time of the 2025 robbery, had asked the Paris police to conduct a security audit of the museum. Although recommendations were made after the audit, they were only beginning to be implemented at the time of the robbery. According to labour unions, Louvre security had been undermined by staff reductions, while museum attendance had soared. The Union syndicale Solidaires issued a statement on 19 October 2025, complaining about "the destruction of security jobs" at the Louvre. Other security lapses came to light in the aftermath, including insufficient CCTV coverage with only 39% of the museum's rooms being monitored by cameras, and the CCTV in the Apollo Gallery facing the wrong way. A 2014 audit by France's National Cybersecurity Agency had warned the museum about serious security flaws, including the use of "trivial" passwords and outdated software. It was reported that the password to get into the surveillance system was "Louvre".

Other French museums that have also recently been targeted and had items stolen include the Cognacq-Jay Museum and the Hiéron Museum, both in November 2024, and the Adrien Dubouché Museum in September 2025. The National Museum of Natural History in Paris was also robbed of gold worth €600,000 on 16 September 2025.

== Theft ==
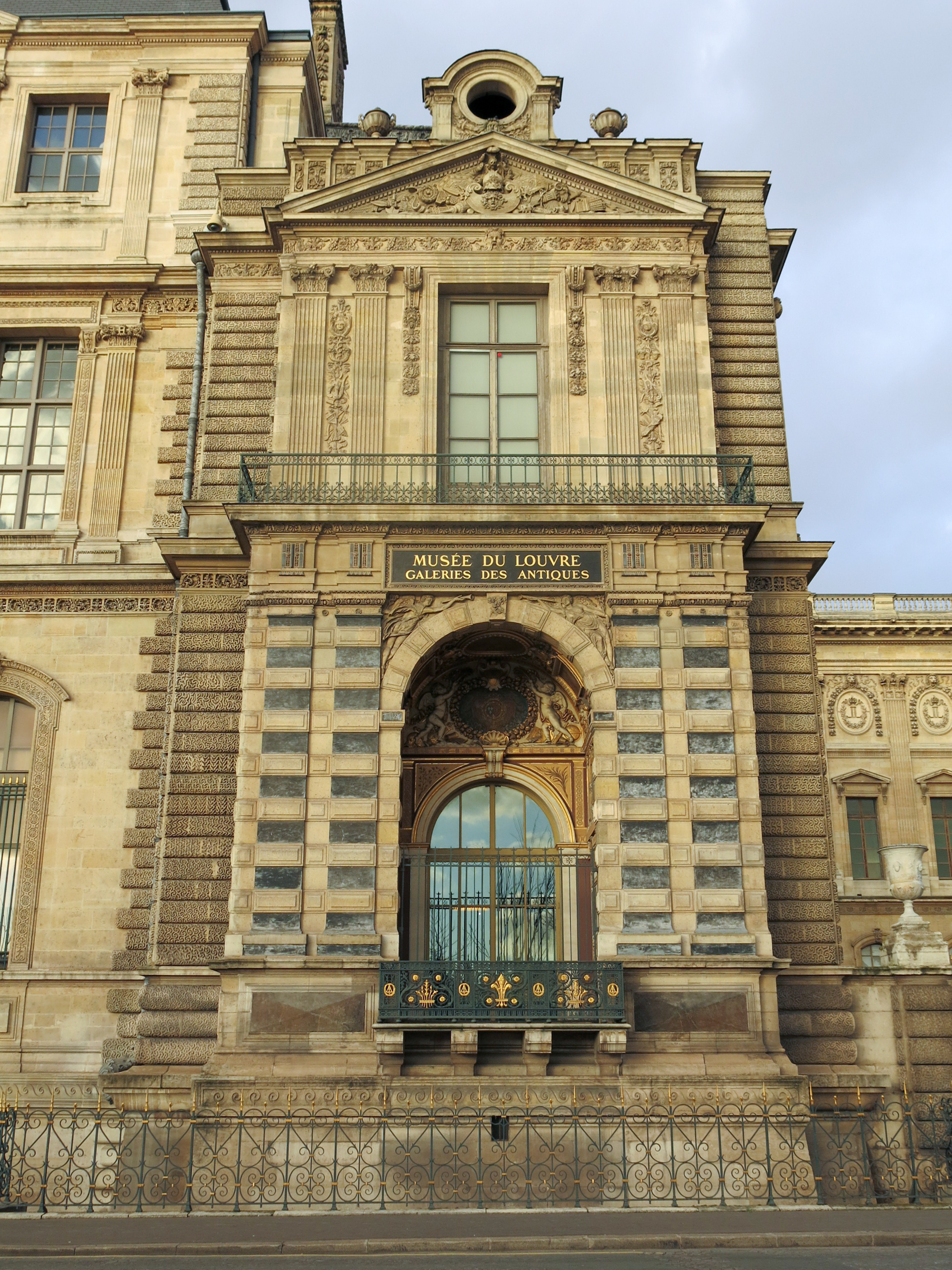
The robbers entered the museum through the Balcon de Charles IX

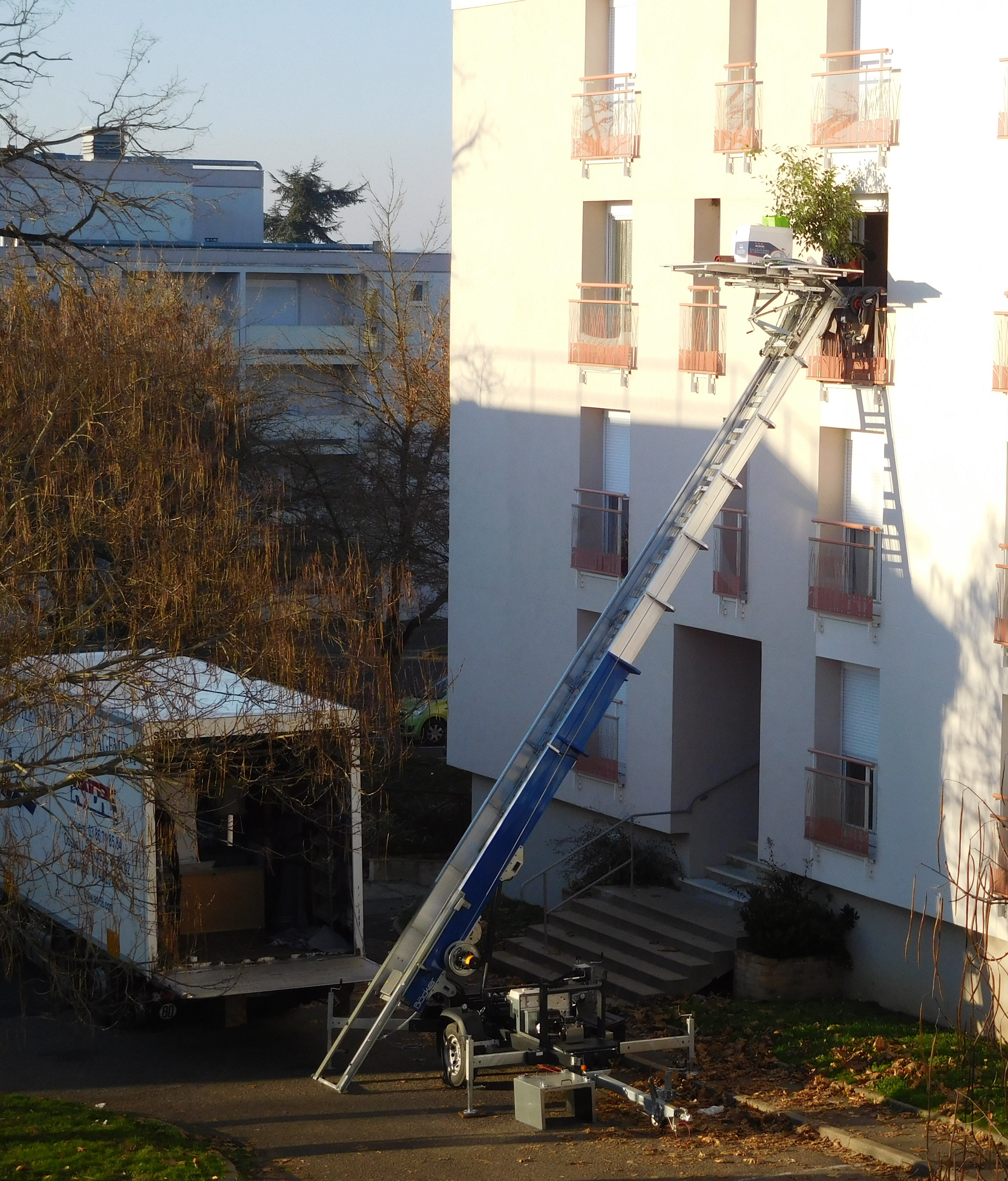
A furniture lift similar to the one used in the robbery

The robbery occurred at approximately 9:30 am CEST, 30 minutes after the museum opened to visitors. The thieves arrived at the building and entered from the side of the Seine river, bringing tools. They wore yellow-and-orange vests to disguise themselves as construction workers. Two members, with their faces concealed with balaclavas, gained entry to a first-storey balcony of the building's south side using a furniture lift, which are common in Paris.

From the balcony, they used a disc cutter to cut through a glass window to access the gallery, triggering security alarms. After threatening the guards with their power tools, the thieves took nine pieces from two glass display cases. Leaving the museum using the lift, they met up with two other members of the crew who were waiting on motor scooters. During their exit, they dropped the Crown of Empress Eugénie in the street, reducing their haul to eight items. They attempted to set fire to the basket of the lift before fleeing. The thieves fled along the banks of the Seine to the Boulevard Périphérique and then took the A6 autoroute southward. The entire robbery took just under eight minutes, of which the thieves spent only four in the building proper.

== Items stolen ==
The items were identified by the Ministry of Culture as:

- The tiara, necklace and an earring from the sapphire set of Queen Marie-Amalie and Queen Hortense
- The emerald necklace and a pair of emerald earrings from the Empress Marie Louise set
- The reliquary brooch, a large corsage bow brooch and the tiara of Empress Eugénie de Montijo

While fleeing, the robbers dropped the Crown of Empress Eugénie, which was found heavily damaged, missing a golden eagle and 10 diamonds and itself basically crushed due to the thieves pulling it through an opening in the glass cases that was too small for it. Director De Cars shared that "initial assessments suggest that a delicate restoration is possible". The Paris prosecutor's office said that a second jewelled item had also been dropped but did not say what it was. Media and experts noted that the thieves did not appear to target several significant diamonds in the gallery: the Regent (valued at €51 million alone), the Sancy, and the Hortensia.

The prosecutor Laure Beccuau said that "the Louvre curator estimated the damages to be €88 million" but also added that "the greater loss was to France's historical heritage".

Stolen items

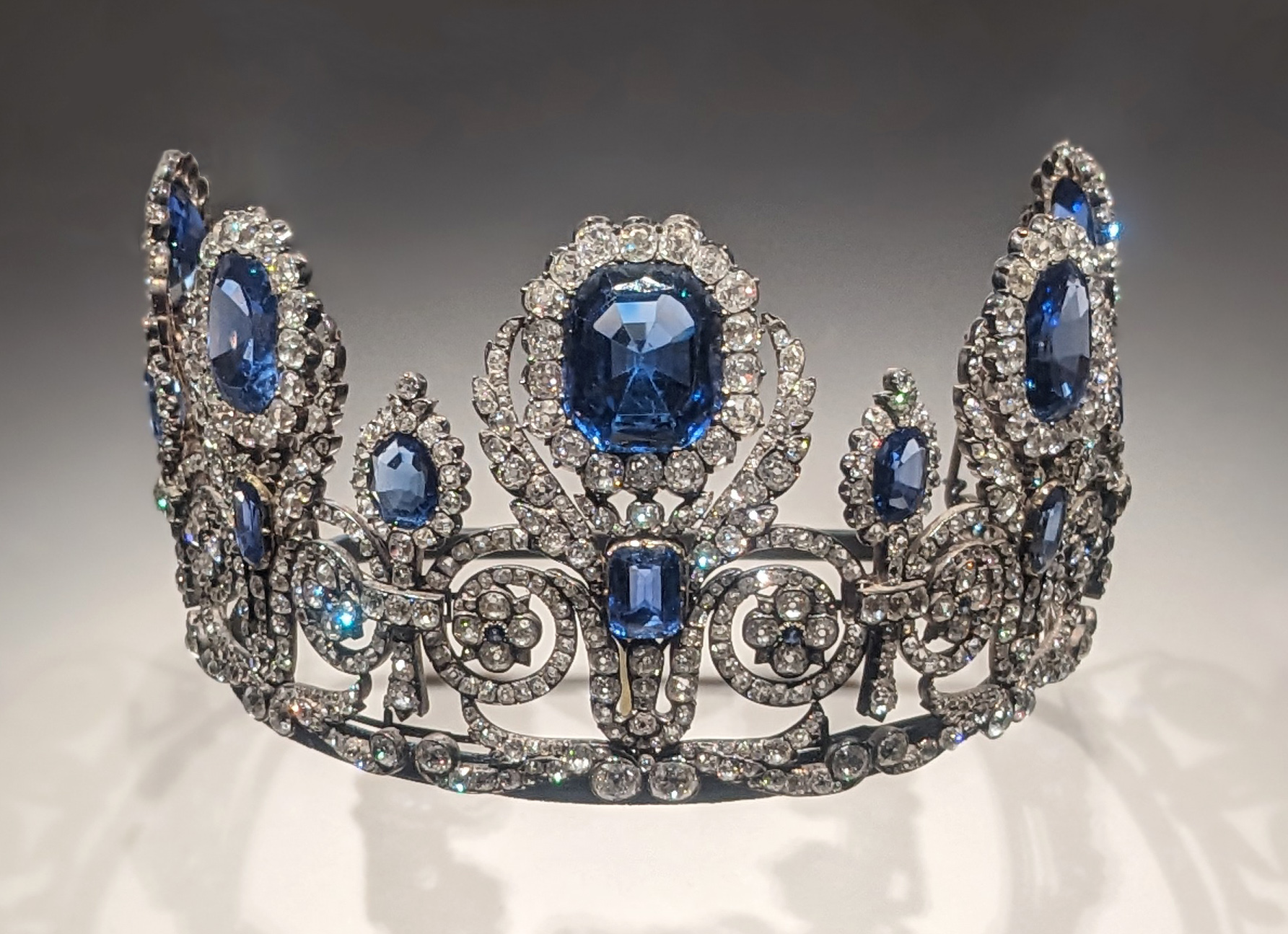
Tiara from the sapphire set of Queen Marie-Amalie and Queen Hortense

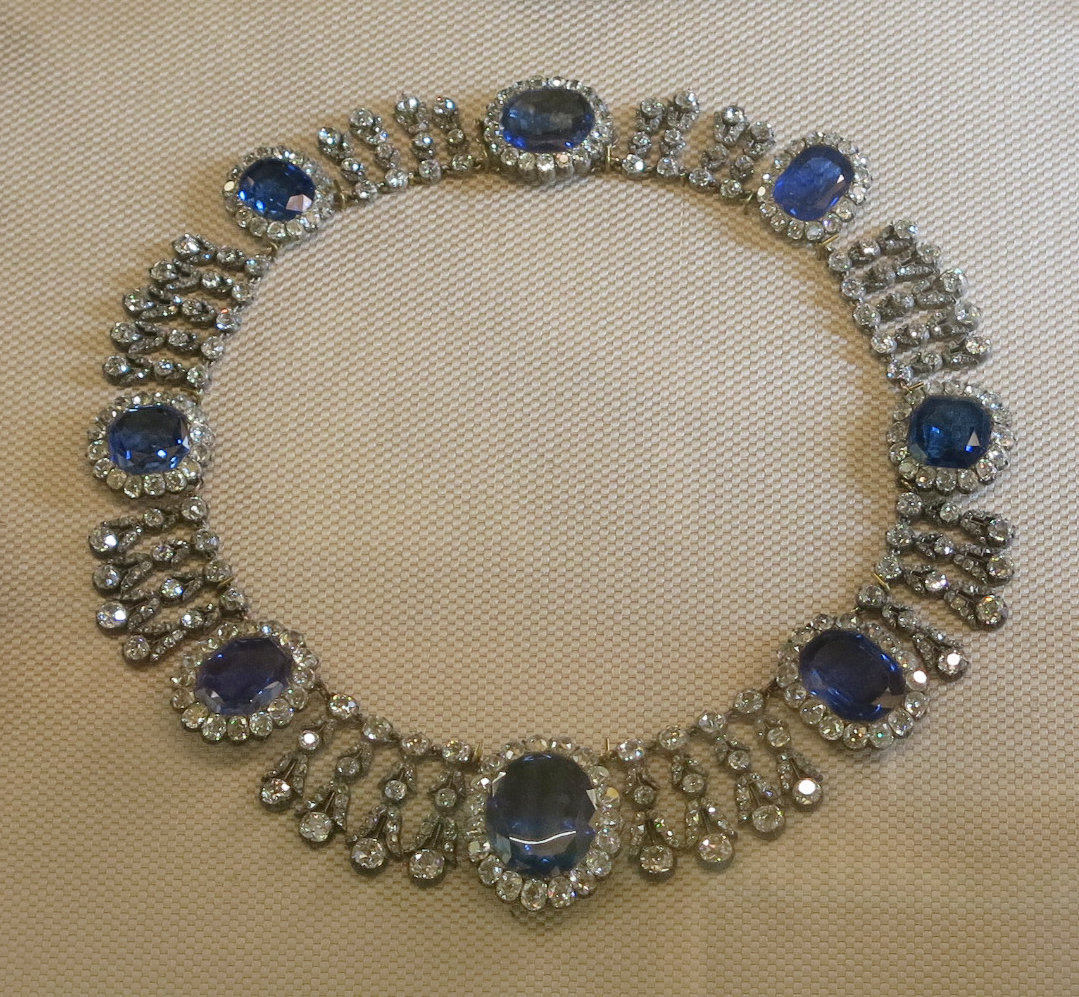
Necklace from the same set

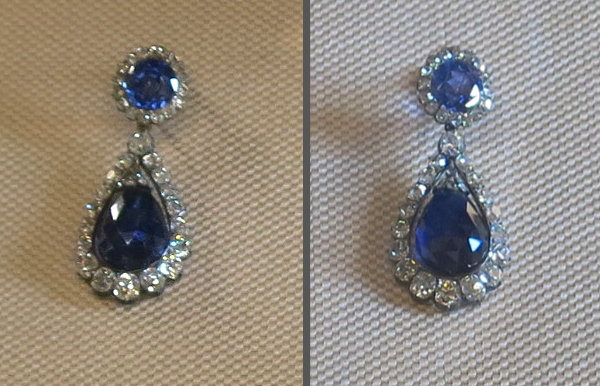
Earrings from the same set

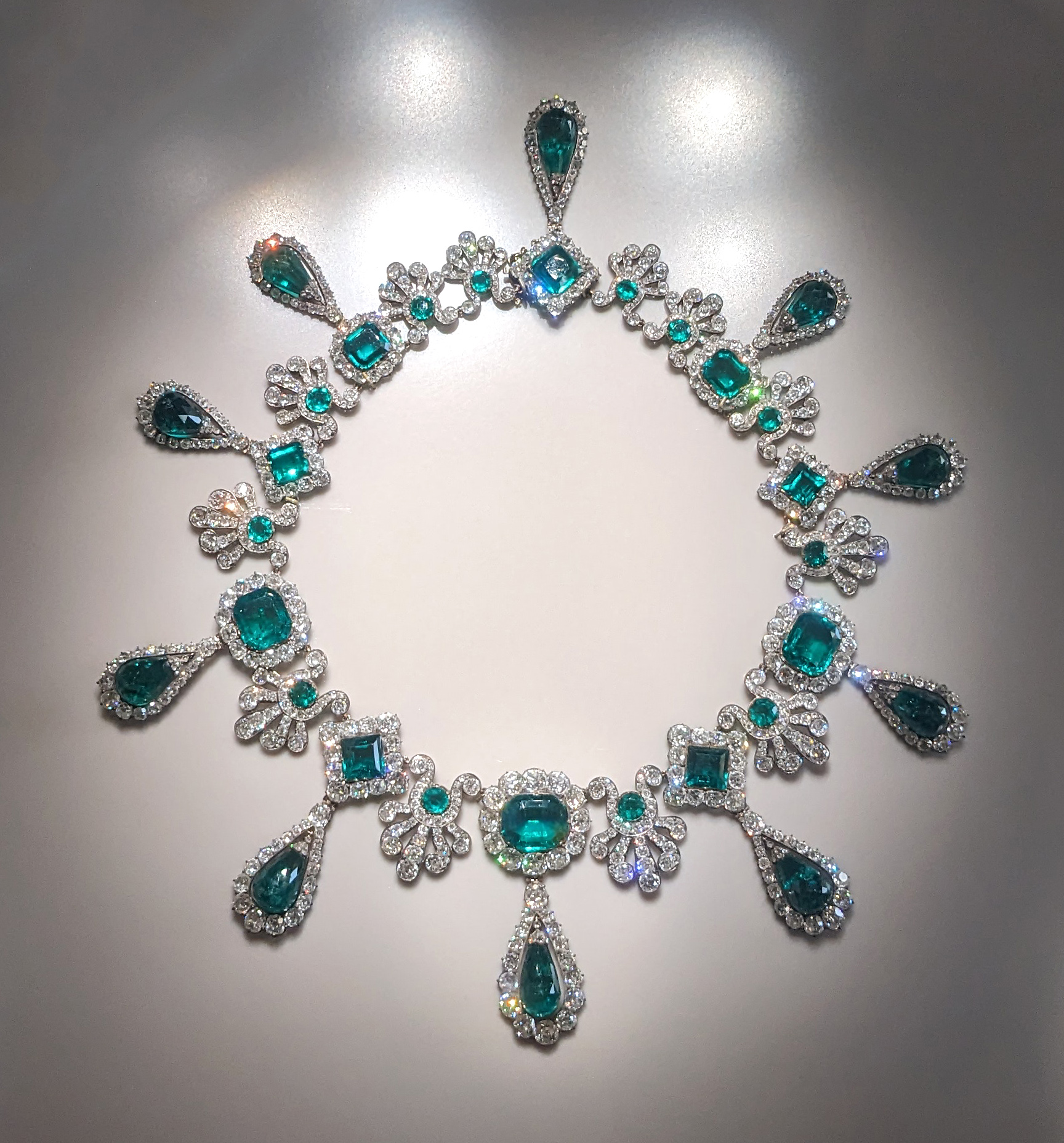
Emerald necklace from Marie Louise's set

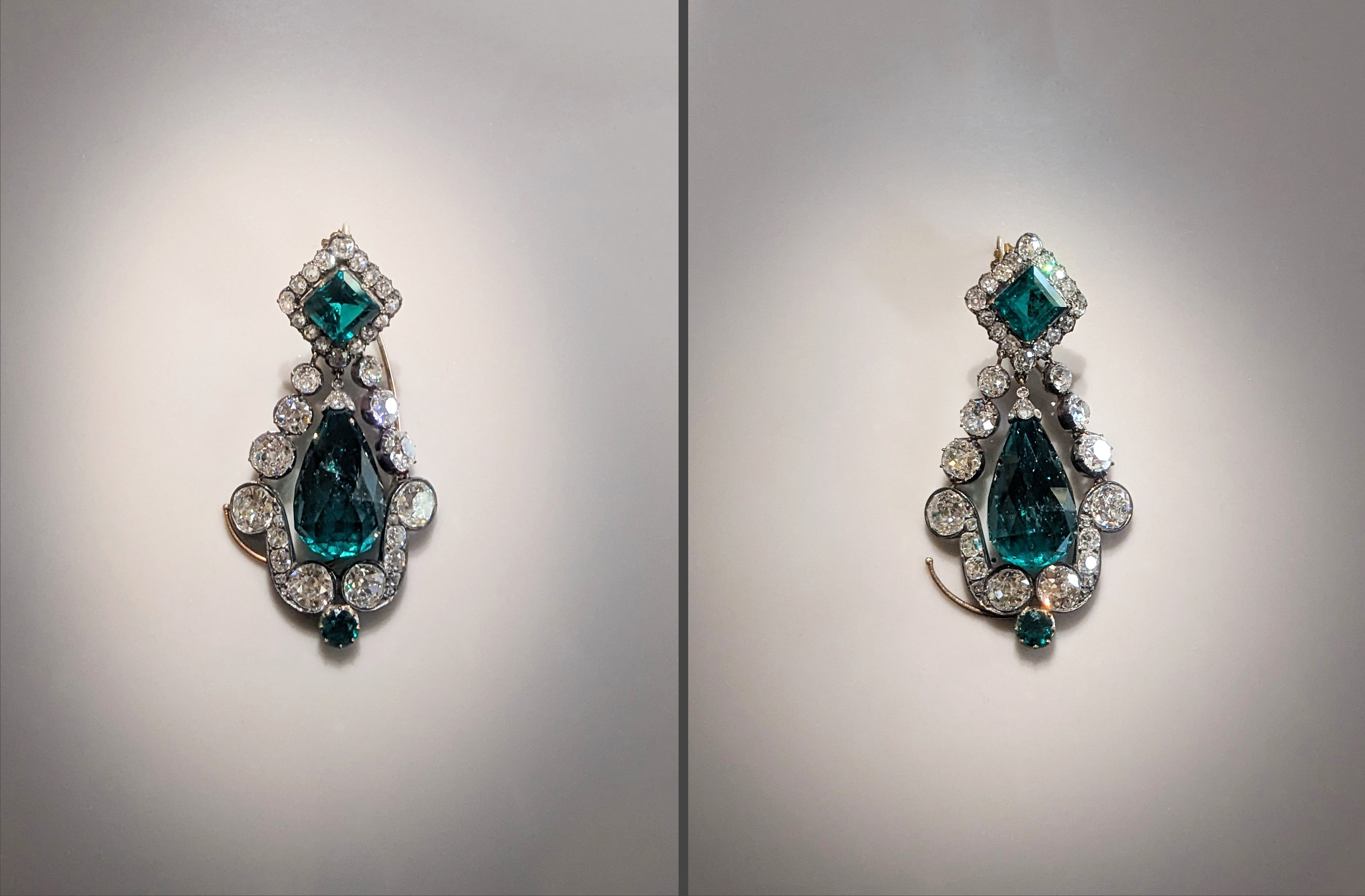
Pair of emerald earrings from Marie Louise's set

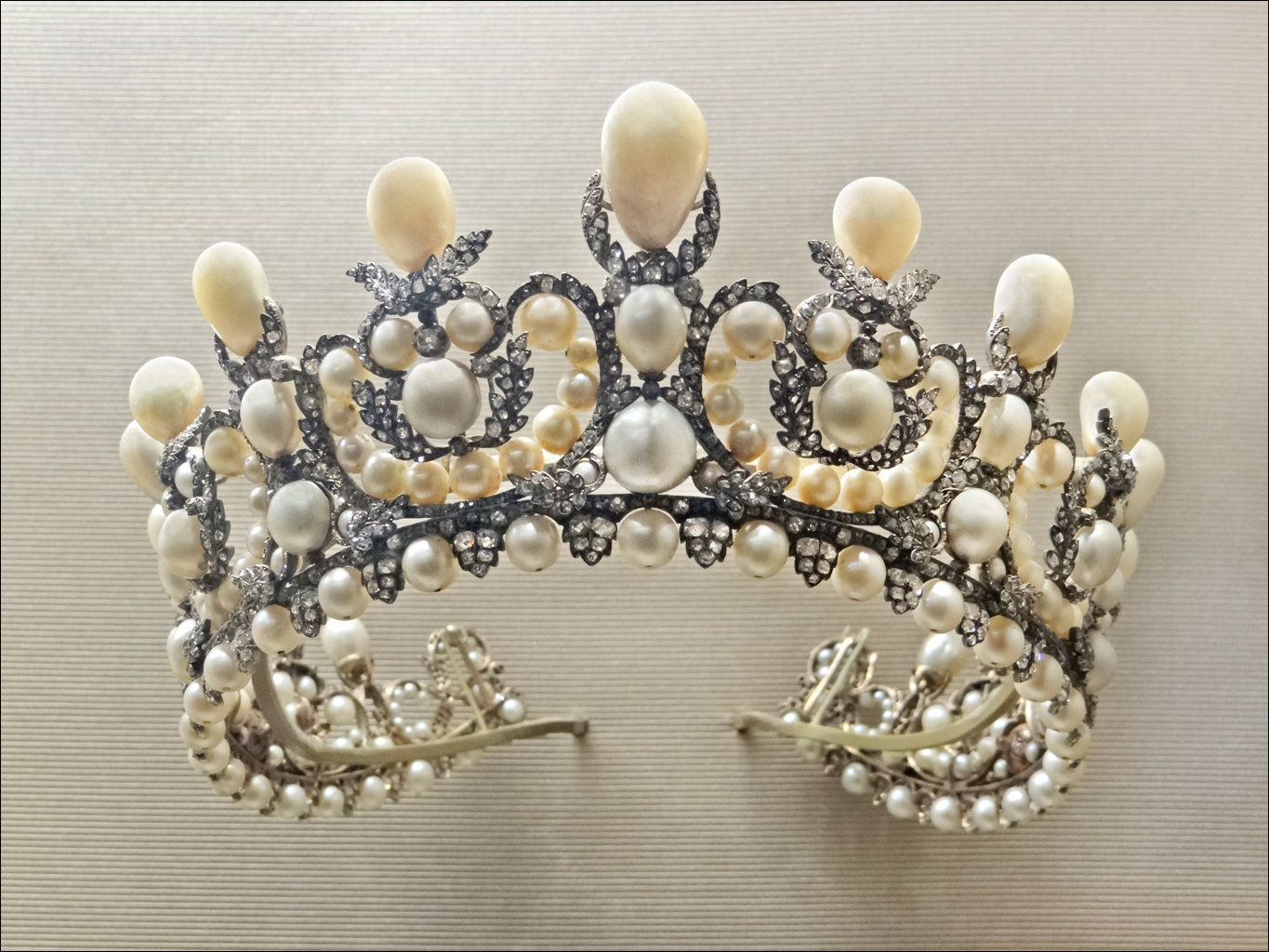
Tiara of Empress Eugénie

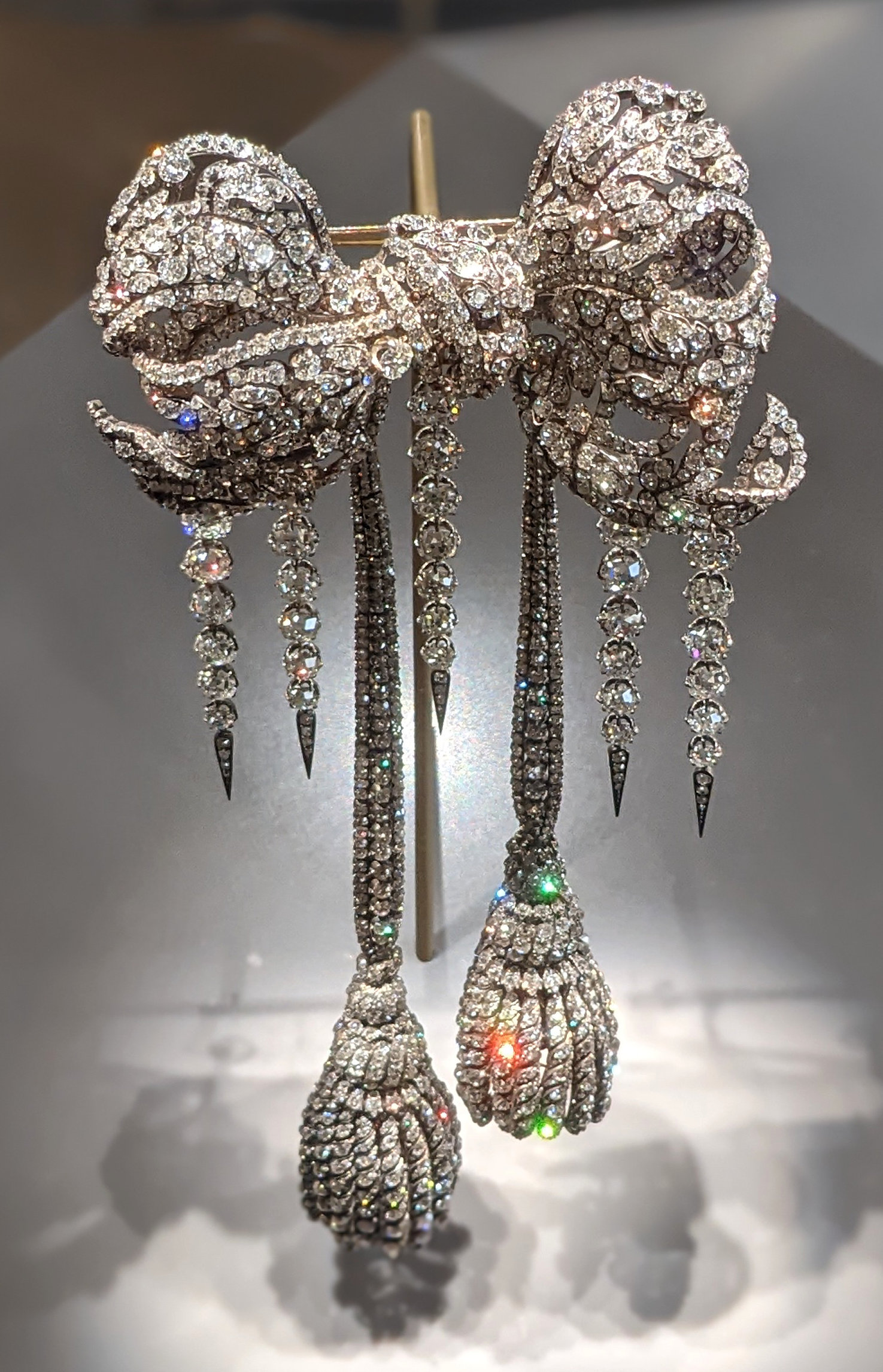
Large bodice bow of Empress Eugénie

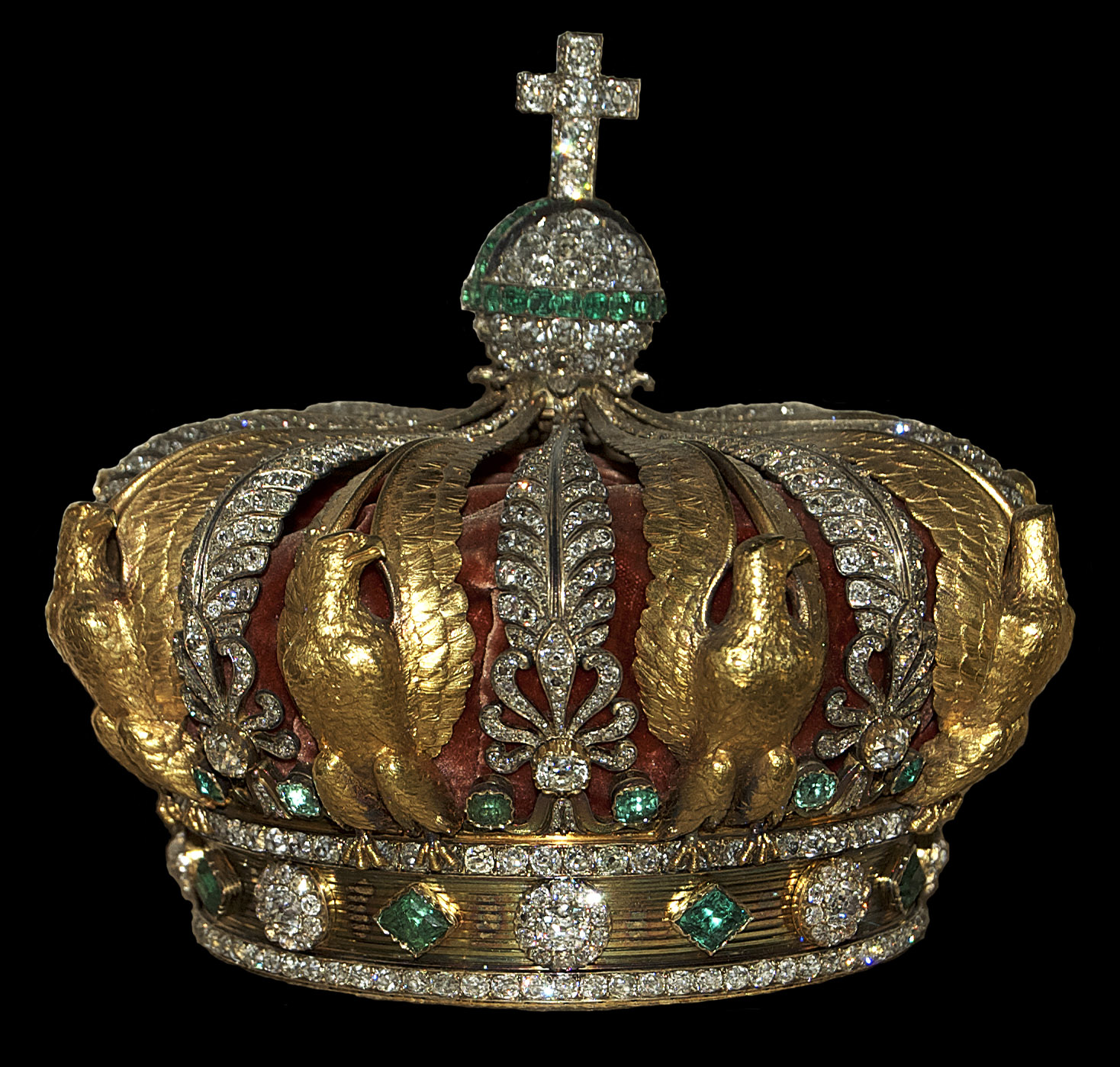
Crown of Empress Eugénie (recovered, damaged)

== Investigation ==
The Paris prosecutor's office opened an investigation into the incident, with the prosecutor Laure Beccuau saying that 60 people had been assigned to the investigation. Interior minister Laurent Nuñez said in a later statement that more than 100 investigators were assigned; more than 150 pieces of evidence were collected, including fingerprints and DNA.

Police reviewed CCTV footage along the escape route. Photographs showed a small truck parked next to the museum with its lift extended up to a first-floor balcony. Le Parisien reported that the police recovered power tools, a blowtorch, gasoline, gloves, a walkie-talkie, a blanket and a crown at the scene.

Four people were suspected of participating in the robbery itself. Two individuals were arrested in connection with the robbery on 25 October, one of them at Charles de Gaulle Airport while trying to board a plane bound for Algeria. Both were already known to police from past burglary cases. Investigators said they matched trace DNA evidence recovered from a helmet left at the scene of the crime to one of the suspects. After four days, the prosecutor's office revealed that the two arrested had partially admitted to their involvement, and that they were charged with vols en bande organisée (organised gang theft) and association de malfaiteurs (criminal conspiracy).

Five more suspects were arrested on 29 October, only one of them thought to be part of the four-man team. Two were charged before a magistrate on 31 October: a 37-year-old-man (theft and criminal conspiracy) and a 38-year-old-woman (organised theft and criminal conspiracy with a view to committing a crime). Both denied any involvement. Three were released.

The prosecutor's office reported on 25 November that four more suspects from Paris were detained by police. One was charged before a magistrate on 27 November: a 39-year-old man (organised gang theft and criminal conspiracy). The man is believed to be the final member of the four-man team. The other three detained on 27 November were released.

The location of the jewels remains unknown as of October 2026.

== Aftermath ==
The museum was evacuated and closed to the public immediately after the robbery. Interpol added the jewels to its Stolen Works of Art database on 20 October. The museum re-opened on 22 October, with the Galerie d'Apollon reopening on 22 July 2026.

After the robbery, French President Emmanuel Macron ordered a "speeding-up" of the implementation of the recommendations made during a previous audit.

The museum's director, Laurence des Cars, appeared before the Senate's Committee on Culture on 22 October 2025 to address questions by the lawmakers, and acknowledged shortcomings in the museum's surveillance systems, noting that parts of the building were not adequately covered by external cameras at the time of the theft. Des Cars confirmed that she had offered her resignation to the Ministry of Culture on the day of the burglary, but that the offer was declined. On 24 February 2026, it was announced that President Macron had accepted director des Cars' resignation.

As a precaution, some of the precious jewels were transferred from the museum to the Bank of France in the weeks following the heist. In February 2026, the Louvre began the bidding process to hire a restorer for the Crown of Empress Eugénie, which had been damaged after having been pulled through a hole in its case far too small to entirely fit and later being dropped by the thieves during their escape.

== Reactions ==
President Macron condemned the robbery, saying it was "an attack on a heritage that we cherish because it is our history." He pledged to recover the jewels and bring the perpetrators to justice. Justice Minister Gérald Darmanin said it gave France "a terrible image" but was confident the perpetrators would be apprehended. Interior Minister Laurent Nuñez called it a "major robbery" and said the stolen goods were "of immeasurable heritage value". Culture Minister Rachida Dati told TF1, "We saw some footage: they don't target people, they enter calmly in four minutes, smash display cases, take their loot, and leave. No violence, very professional."

Opposition politicians have used the robbery to harshly criticise the current government. Jordan Bardella of National Rally called it a humiliation and asked how far the State will continue to decay. Éric Ciotti, UDR leader in the National Assembly, described the robbery as an "ultimate symbol of [the current government's] collapse". He also said that by allowing such an event to take place "the entire nation is threatened". Communist Party senator Ian Brossat also criticised the government's feeble reaction to a recent strike over "untenable conditions" at the museum.

Böcker, the company that made the furniture lift used in the theft, published a social media post that went viral highlighting the speed and quietness of their products.

A report by the Cour des Comptes found that in the years prior to the heist, the museum had "favoured operations that were visible and attractive" over essential maintenance and security upgrades. French journalist Didier Rykner accused the museum's director, Laurence des Cars, of prioritising her flagship projects over the basic protection of existing collections.

== In popular culture ==
In 2026, the Louvre heist inspired A Picture of the Ceiling, a mystery novella by Clara Verran. Set during the reopening of the Louvre's Galerie d'Apollon in July 2026, the story brings Sherlock Holmes and Nancy Drew together to investigate a mysterious photograph of one of the stolen jewels.

== See also ==
- 2025 Drents Museum heist – Theft of artifacts in Assen, Netherlands
- 2026 Musée Renoir theft – Theft of two Renoir paintings in France
- Dresden Green Vault burglary – 2019 jewellery theft in Germany
- Mystère au Louvre, a 2017 French television film about a fictional 1885 theft of jewels from the Louvre
- Masterplan (film) – 2026 heist film
