= Max Wechsler =

French abstract artist (1925-2020)

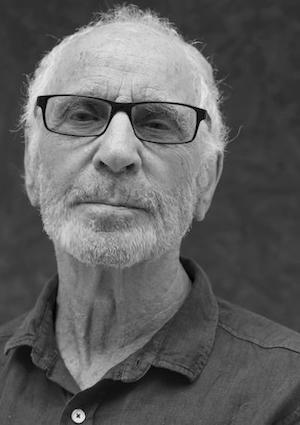
- Born: 1 June 1925; Berlin
- Died: 12 May 2020 (aged 94); Paris
- Resting place: Père Lachaise Cemetery
- Citizenship: French
- Known for: Surrealist and abstract typographical art
- Spouse: Christine Fleurent

Max Wechsler (1 June 1925 – 12 May 2020) was a French painter, draughtsman, collage and mixed-media artist. His work was in the Surrealist and Abstract traditions.

== Early life ==
Max Wechsler was born in June 1925 in Berlin, to a Jewish family. His father was a clerk. In January 1939, aged 13, he was sent on his own to Paris to stay with an uncle, in the aftermath of Kristallnacht. His parents and grandparents, who remained in Berlin, were deported and murdered at Auschwitz in 1943.

During the German invasion of France, he was taken in at the Maison des enfants de Moissac through the network of the Éclaireurs israélites de France (EIF) (Jewish Scouting Movement of France), leading to his first encounter with painters. After the German occupation of the southern section of France, he crossed into Switzerland on 23 January 1943 and joined the Davesco camp near Lugano. At the end of the war he returned to Paris.

He began his artistic career as an illustrator and graphic designer at the children's weekly cartoon newspaper Vaillant, a role he continued part-time until the early 1990s, mainly for the Presses de la Cité group. His encounters with the painter Serge Fiorio during the war in Moissac, and later with René Moreu, then editor-in-chief of Vaillant, proved to be significant.

== Career as an artist ==
His early paintings, from 1958 to 1972, were abstract, influenced by Surrealism. These were painted with oils on plywood and canvas and represented an expression of his traumatic wartime experiences. His first solo exhibition was in 1968 as part of the ARC initiative at the Musée d'Art Moderne de Paris.

Between 1973 and 1977, he voluntarily ceased painting. He later explained how he rejected his earlier work as being too intellectual and "trapped in grief". When he resumed his work in 1978, he turned towards abstraction: a series of works on canvas with striated surfaces, as if slashed into the material.

In 1984, he abandoned the stretcher frame and began producing large-scale works incorporating collages of various materials, papers and newspapers, creating a dense, thick surface. He titled this body of work Recouvrements papiers (Paper overlays). These monumental formats were inspired by the spacious studio he acquired in 1985 in the Bastille district, where he worked until the end of his life. In 1986, he exhibited these large-format works at Galerie Jean Fournier in Paris.

In 1989, he befriended critic and poet Maurice Benhamou, marking the beginning of a long friendship and collaboration.

From 2006, the artist returned to his birthplace, Berlin, with several significant exhibitions, including at the Jewish Museum Berlin, Villa Oppenheim, Galerie KunstbüroBerlin and the Berlinische Galerie, to which he donated some of his work in 2010.

In 2003, he was awarded the Maratier Prize by the Pro mahJ Foundation, which supports the Musée d'Art et d'Histoire du Judaïsme. Wechsler exhibited there several times and donated art work to the museum in 2017.

Elsewhere in Paris, Wechsler exhibited at the Galerie Guislain – États d’Art, Galerie ETC and Galerie Dutko. He also exhibited at the Hiéron Museum in Paray-le-Monial, to which he likewise made a donation. The major donation to the Musée d'Art Moderne de Paris, the host of his first solo exhibition, which he initiated in 2018 and completed by his wife, was presented in the museum’s permanent collections in 2025 and 2026.

He created his final works in 2019 and died in Paris on 12 May 2020, at the age of 94 years. He is buried at Père Lachaise Cemetery (86th division).

== Artistry ==
His early surrealist-inspired compositions, from 1958 until 1972, were described by Pierre Gaudibert as “organic unfoldings, [...] expansions of coils, swellings and fissures”, and characterised by Alfred Pacquement as “symbolic figures reflecting a work of suffering”. These pieces were exhibited by Pierre Gaudibert at the Musée d'Art Moderne de Paris during the first ARC exhibition in 1968.

After 1968, he shifted from painting to large crumpled paper surfaces, and by the early 1990s to works made from photocopied, cut, and mounted text fragments. He became interested in the letter as a form, experimenting with it through erasure, fragmentation, destruction, or by embedding it into works of often monumental size. Referring to his large- and small-scale papiers marouflés (glued-on papers), Wechsler stated: The letter, ceaselessly transformed, destructured, resists, reveals itself to be indestructible... I am fond of associating what will be forever unseen and what remains indelible.”

Art critic and friend Maurice Benhamou described his work as having an “indefinable tonality,” marked by layered light, one “beyond the letter” and one “beneath it.”

== Selected solo exhibitions ==
- 1968: Max Wechsler: peintures, ARC, Musée d’Art Moderne de la Ville de Paris. (Catalogue written by Pierre Gaudibert)
- 2003: Max Wechsler, Musée d’Art et d’Histoire du Judaïsme, Paris, Collection Jüdisches Museum Berlin
- 2006: Max Wechsler: Unter der Oberfläche, Villa Oppenheim, Berlin
- 2013: Max Wechsler: Klang der Sprache, Gœthe-Institut, Paris
- 2014: Max Wechsler: at Hôtel Frison, exhibition curator: Frédéric Guislain, Brussels
- 2017: Donation Max Wechsler, Musée d’Art et d’Histoire du Judaïsme, Paris
- 2017: Max Wechsler: de la lettre au signe, Journées Européennes du Patrimoine, Abbatiale Saint Férréol d’Essômes-sur-Marne.

== Selected group exhibitions ==
- 2010: Spotlight Sammlung: Die Schenkungen Herbert Kaufmann und Max Wechsler, Berlinische Galerie, Berlin

== Posthumous exhibitions ==
- 2023: Max Wechsler, galerie ETC, Paris
- 2023: Max Wechsler, galerie Faider, Brussels
- 2023: Max Wechsler: un parcours, galerie Dutko, Paris
- 2025: Brand New!: dons récents aux collections, (recent acquisitions) (group exhibition), MAMC+, Saint-Étienne
- 2025: En vis-à-vis, joint show with Mathieu Bonardet
- 2025: Max Wechsler: chemins croisés, galerie Dutko, Paris
- 2025: Poetics of Substraction, Niso Gallery, London.

== Permanent collections ==
- MAM / Musée d'art moderne de Paris (MAM)
- Musée d'art moderne et contemporain, Saint-Etienne Métropole (MAMC+)
- Musée national d'art moderne, Centre Pompidou, Paris
- Hiéron Museum, Paray-Le-Monial
- Musée d'Art et d'Histoire du Judaïsme, Paris
- Jüdisches Museum, Berlin
- Berlinische Galerie, Berlin
- Centre national des arts plastiques, Paris

== Bibliography ==
=== Monographie ===
- Ruth Martius (dir.), Max Wechsler. Respiration du silence, Berlin, Jovis Verlag, 2012.

=== Exhibition catalogues ===
- Max Wechsler. Peintures, introduction de Pierre Gaudibert, Paris, musée d’Art moderne de la Ville de Paris, 1968.
- Maurice Benhamou, Max Wechsler. L’immobilité, autrement dit le silence, Paris, Éditions Espace-Abstraction, 1990.
- Maurice Benhamou, Quatre peintres de la couleur tensive, Paris, Éditions Espace-Abstraction,1997.
- Max Wechsler, Autrement dit, textes de Maurice Benhamou, René Guiffrey, Saralev H. Hollander, Rütjer Rühle, Max Wechsler, Paris, Éditions Espace-Abstraction, 2002.
- Max Wechsler. Unter der Oberfläche, Papiers marouflés, Berlin, Villa Oppenheim, 2006.
- Max Wechsler. Entfaltung der Tiefe, Berlin, Villa Oppenheim, 2007.
- Maurice Benhamou, De la peinture, Paris, galerie ETC, 2019.

=== Articles ===
- Maurice Benhamou, « Max Wechsler », dans Une collection pour la grande arche, Paris, AXA - Caisse des dépôts et consignations,1989.
- Maurice Benhamou, « L’immobilité autrement dit le silence », dans De la peinture à proprement parler, Paris, L’Harmattan, 2011.
- Maurice Benhamou, « Max Wechsler. Dessins », Sans Titre 1 et Sans titre 2, Paris, Éditions Espace-Abstraction, 2014.
- Maurice Benhamou, « Le vide et la lettre », dans Max Wechsler, Paris, galerie ETC, 2019.
- Annika Brockschmidt, « Flüstertone », Der Tagesspiegel, Berlin, 14 juillet 2012.
- Dominique Dendraël, « Infiniment », dans Max Wechsler, en signe de vie, Paray-le-Monial, musée du Hiéron, 2012.
- Dominique Dendraël, « Max Wechsler à St Matthäus-Kirche de Berlin », décembre 2014.
- Dominique Dendraël, « L’infini de la création », L’Art en partage, Paray-le-Monial, musée du Hiéron, 2018, p. 20-27
- Lydia Harambourg, « Max Wechsler, plis et replis », Gazette de l’hôtel Drouot, Paris, février 2005.
- Andreas Haus, “Max Wechsler/Schriftfragmente », Kunstverein Kunsthaus Potsdam, Potsdam, 2013.
- Heidi Jäger, « Aufgebrochene Sprachlosigkeit » Potsdamer Neueste Nachrichten, Potsdam, 23 février 2012
- Kai Müller, « Meine Bilder atmen für mich », Der Tagesspiegel, Berlin, 22 Janvier 2006.
- Michel Nuridsany, « Silence radieux, Max Wechsler à contre-courant », Le Figaro, Paris, octobre 1990.
- Alfred Pacquement, « Max Wechsler, Sans titre, 1986 », Paris, Fonds national d’art contemporain, 1989.
- Heinz Stahlhut, « Wortmaterial », Museums Journal, Berlin, avril-juin 2010, p. 59.
- Cathie Silvestre, « À la rencontre de Max Wechsler », Esquisse(s), n° 5, automne 2013.
- Elisabeth Wagner, « Materiale Nachbarschaften. Max Wechslers Papiers Marouflés », Literarische Nachbarschaften, Die Mosse-Lectures an der Humboldt-Universität zu Berlin, Berlin, n° 8, 2016, p. 79-96.
- Daniel Zaoui, « En écho à Max Wechsler », Esquisse(s), n° 5, automne 2013.
- Jeannette Zwingenberger, « Werke aus Wortwirbeln », ParisBerlin, Paris, juin 2013, p.74-79.
