= Sapphire set of Queen Marie-Amalie and Queen Hortense =

French jewelry set

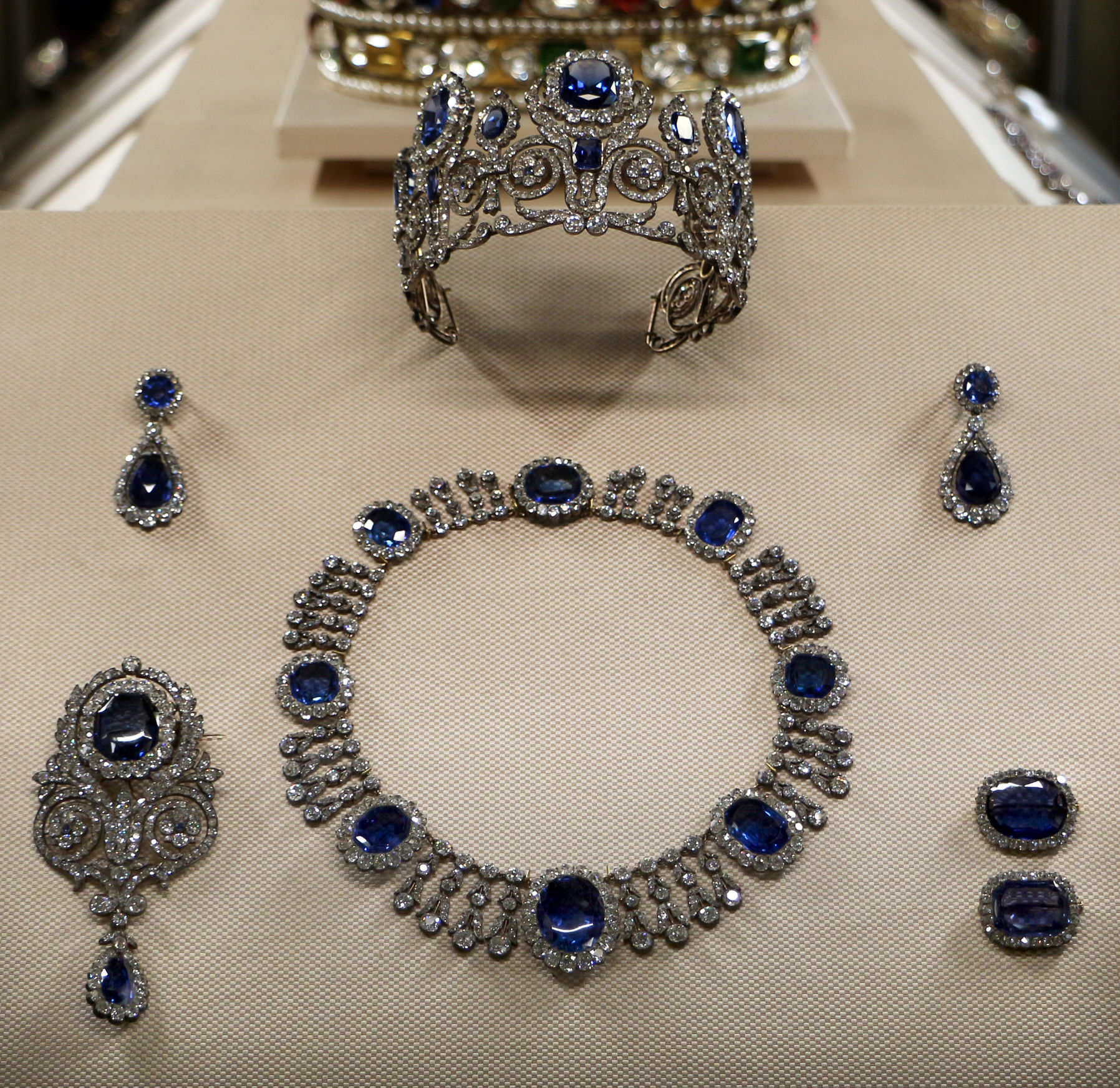
The jewellery at the Louvre.

The sapphire parure of Queen Marie-Amélie and Queen Hortense is a set of jewellery created under the First French Empire. It first belonged to Hortense de Beauharnais, Queen of Holland, and later to Marie-Amalie of Bourbon–Sicilies, Queen of the French.

It was partially stolen from the Louvre Museum on October 19, 2025.

== Owners of the parure ==
The sapphire parure was successively worn by Hortense de Beauharnais, Queen of Holland; Princess Marie-Amalie of Bourbon–Sicilies, Queen of the French; and Isabelle d’Orléans, Duchess of Guise.

It was owned by Hortense de Beauharnais (1783–1837), Queen Marie-Amélie (1782–1866), Louis-Philippe Albert d’Orléans, Count of Paris (1838–1894), Louis-Philippe Robert, Duke of Orléans (1869–1926), Isabelle d’Orléans, Duchess of Guise (1878–1961), and Henri d’Orléans, Count of Paris (1908–1999). Finally, it was partially acquired by the Louvre Museum in 1985.

== Composition of the set ==
The sapphire parure of Queen Marie-Amélie and Queen Hortense consists of a tiara, a necklace, a pair of earrings, two small brooches, one large brooch, a comb, and two bracelets. All the jewels are adorned with Ceylon sapphires, each surrounded by diamonds, and mounted in gold. The set was created in Paris and has been altered over time.

=== At the Louvre ===
The pieces acquired by the Louvre are kept by the Department of Decorative Arts of the Middle Ages, Renaissance, and Modern Times. They are exhibited in the Denon Wing (Room 705, Galerie d’Apollon).

- The tiara (inventory number OA 11030) is composed of twenty-four sapphires—five large and ten very little ones—and 1,083 diamonds. It has been modified over time, as seen in iconographic documents.
- The necklace (inventory number OA 11031) contains eight sapphires of various sizes and 631 diamonds. The necklace is articulated.
- The large brooch (inventory number OA 11032) is of the “Sévigné” type. It contains four sapphires—two very small—and 263 diamonds. Its design is similar to that of the tiara.
- The pair of earrings (inventory numbers OA 11033 and OA 11034) each feature a stud with a small sapphire surrounded by diamonds and a pendant with a sapphire briolette framed by diamonds—fifty-nine diamonds in total per earring.
- The two small brooches (inventory numbers OA 11035 and OA 11036) each contain one sapphire and twenty-six diamonds.
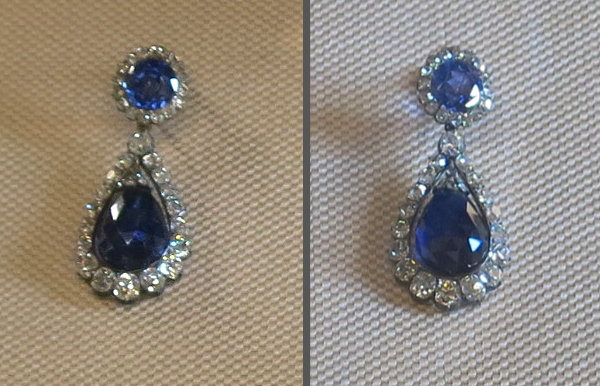
Earrings from the set.

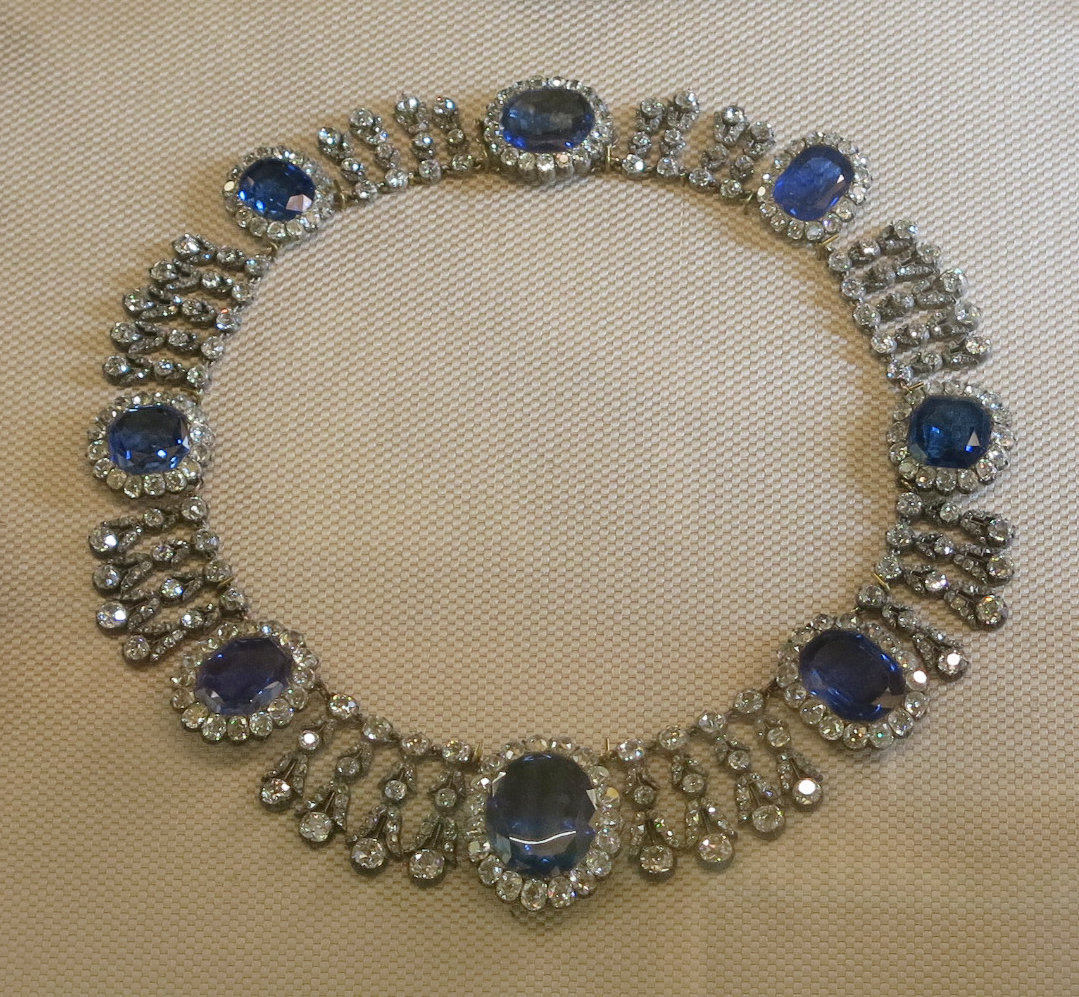
Necklace from the jewellery set.

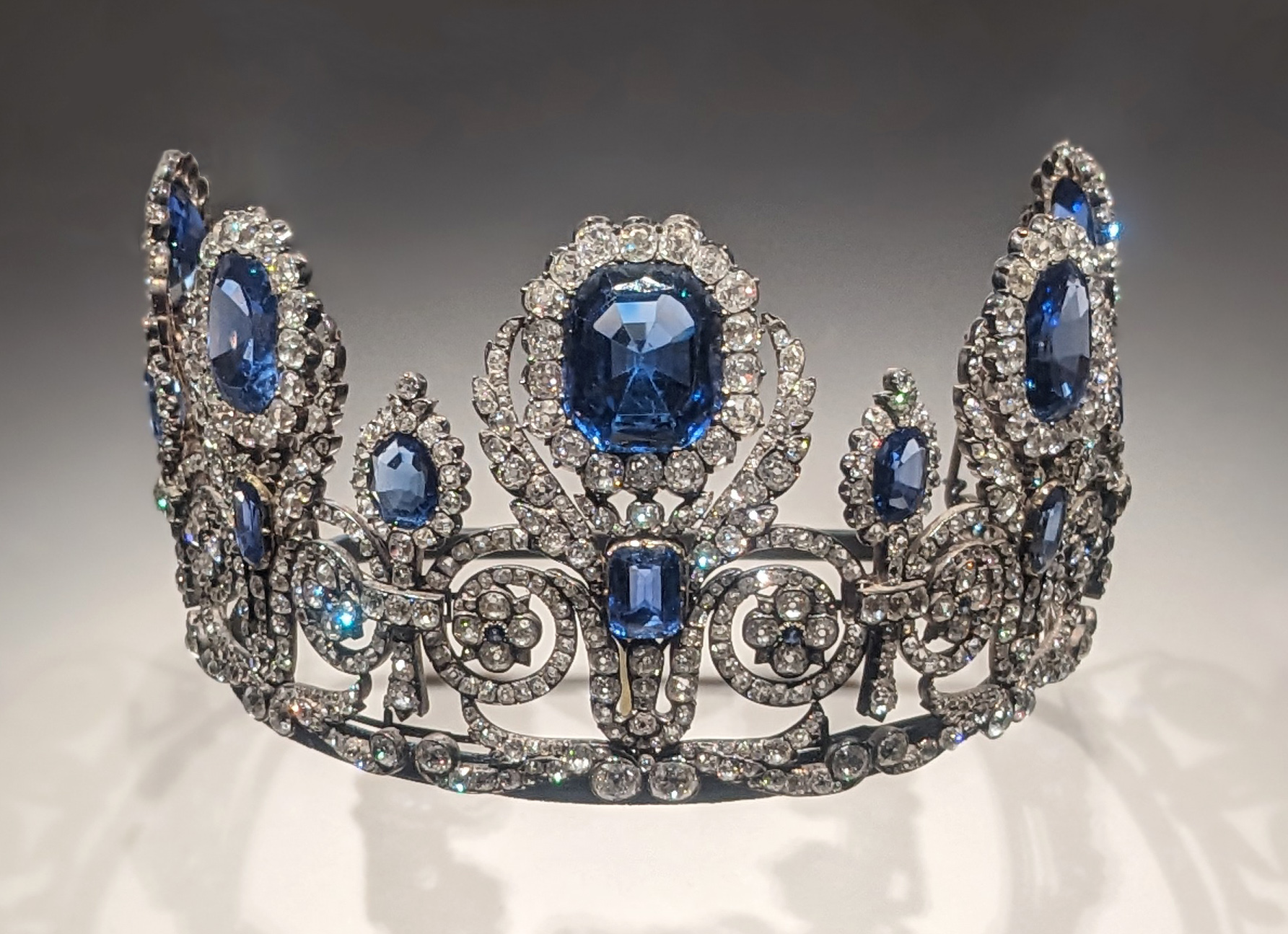
Diadem of the jewelry.

=== Other items in the collection ===
A comb and two bracelets.

== Iconography of the parure ==
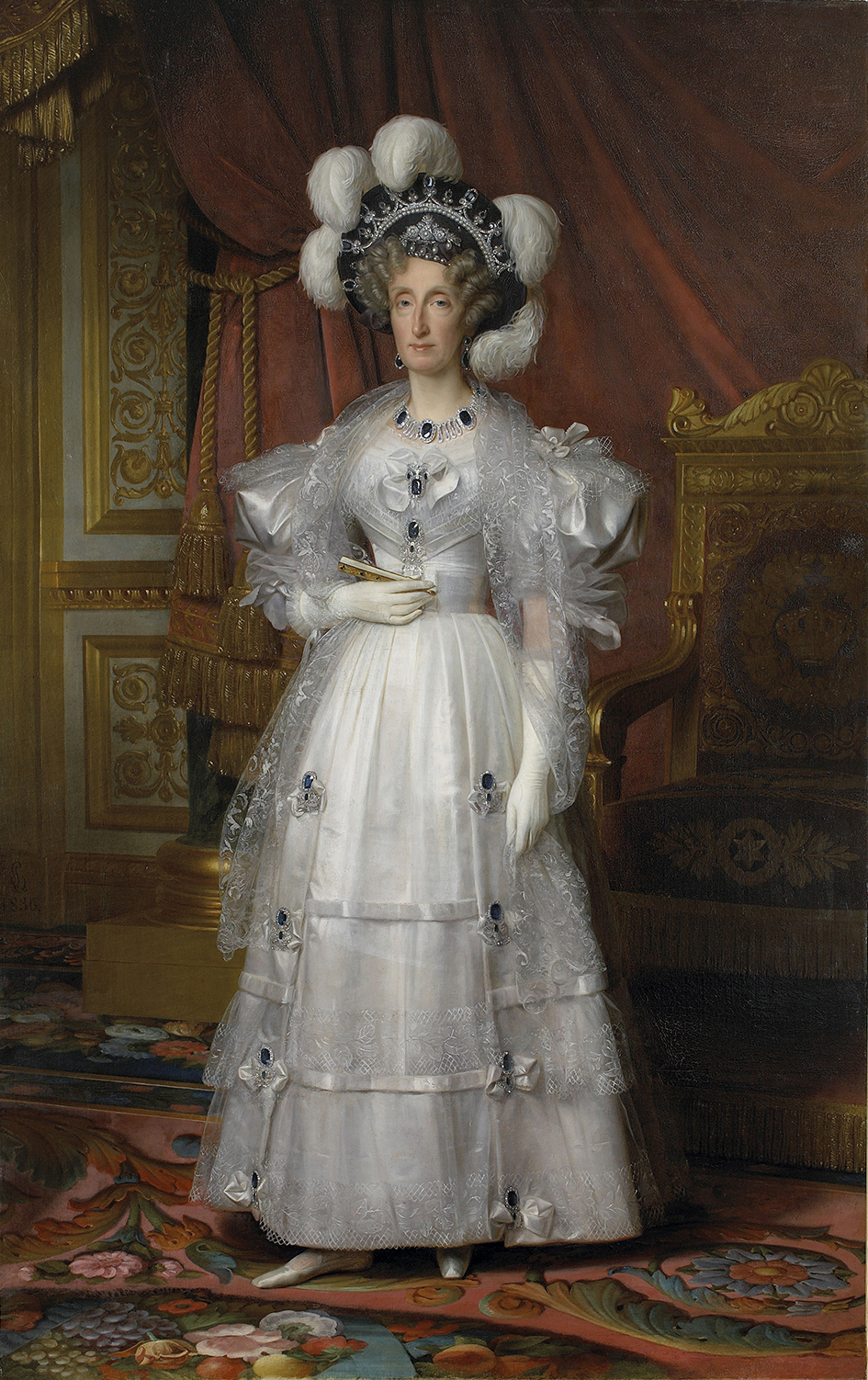
Marie-Amélie of Bourbon, Princess of the Two Sicilies, Queen of the French, by Louis Hersent, 1836.

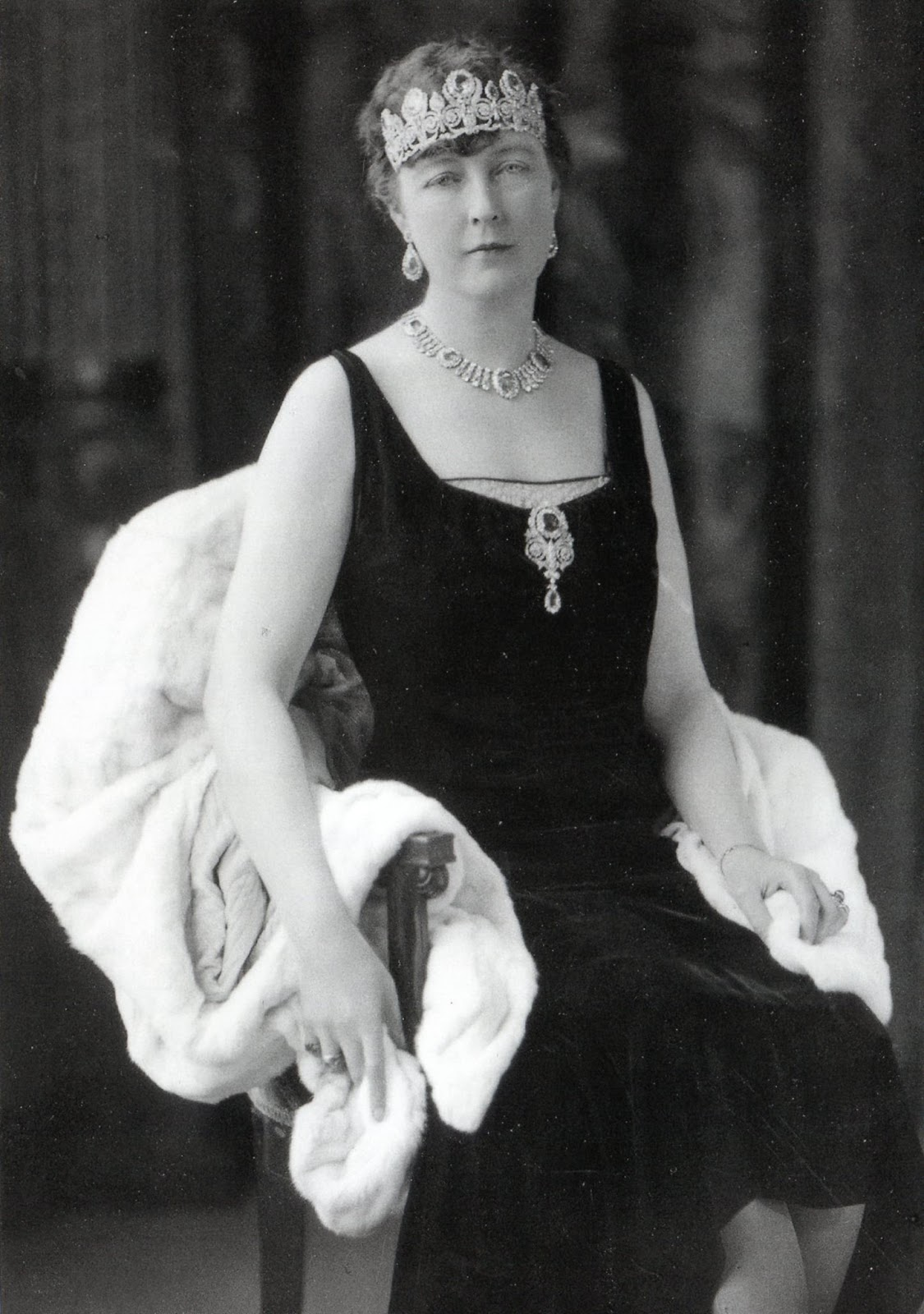
Isabelle d’Orléans, Duchess of Guise, 1920s.

== Theft ==
On October 19, 2025, the necklace, tiara, and one of the earrings from the sapphire parure of Queen Marie-Amélie and Queen Hortense were stolen from the Louvre Museum, along with five other objects, including the Crown of Empress Eugénie, which was dropped by the thieves during their escape.

== Bibliography ==
- Anne Dion-Tenenbaum (ed.), Les diamants de la Couronne et joyaux des souverains français [The Crown Diamonds and Jewels of the French Sovereigns], Éditions Faton, 2023, pp. 132, 159, 164, 198–203, cat. 27.
- Sophie Baratte (ed.), Nouvelles acquisitions du département des Objets d'art: 1985–1989 [New Acquisitions of the Department of Decorative Arts: 1985–1989], exhibition catalogue (Paris, Musée du Louvre, 26 October 1990 – 21 January 1991), Paris, Réunion des musées nationaux (RMN), 1990, no. 121.
