= Mohamed Amra =

French criminal and escapee

- Born: 10 March 1994 (age 32); Rouen, Normandy, France
- Other names: La Mouche (The Fly); Momo; Yanis; Schtroumpf (Smurf)
- Status: imprisoned
- Escaped: 14 May 2024 – 22 February 2025 (9 months)

Details
- Span of crimes: 2009 – May 2024
- Imprisoned at: Vendin-le-Vieil prison.

Mohamed Amra (born 10 March 1994), also known as "The Fly" (French: La Mouche), is an Algerian-French criminal. He has been indicted for several crimes, including kidnapping that resulted in death. French police suspect that Amra is a drug lord involved in international drug trafficking and has links to organized crime gangs in Marseille.

In May 2024, he escaped from a prison van during an armed ambush that killed two prison officers, but was rearrested in Romania on 22 February 2025 after an Interpol Red notice was issued after his escape. Amra was extradited to France three days later and, on 24 July 2025, transferred to Vendin-le-Vieil supermax prison.

== Early life ==
Amra was born on 10 March 1994 in Rouen, the capital of Normandy to Algerian parents. He grew up in the Sandpit council estate of the city.

== Criminal career ==
Amra grew up in a troubled environment and ended up engaging in criminal activities. From the age of 11 to 14, he was charged nineteen times with "carrying a prohibited weapon", "theft by trickery", extortion, drug trafficking and criminal conspiracy, among other counts. The cases were all closed without further action from the state. He was first convicted of a crime in October 2009 at the age of 15.

Since then, he has garnered 13 convictions for robbery, extortion, criminal conspiracy, armed violence, and other crimes. In January 2022, he was jailed in Évreux prison to serve several sentences for these convictions. Police and prosecutors have suspected Amra of heading a narcotics network and holding significant links to organized crime groups in Marseille; however, none of his convictions are drug-related. He is not considered radicalized or suspected of terrorism by law enforcement.

Among his convictions are an attempted murder charge. In 2022, he was indicted for involvement in a gang-related kidnapping that resulted in death in Marseille. Amra has been described by Reuters as a "mid-level" player in the drug trade in France, while French media linked him to powerful Marseille-based crime syndicate "The Blacks". French news agency Le Monde has described him in the "middle-of-the-pack of the gangster hierarchy". According to police, Amra has been involved in the international drug trade. However, his lawyer, Hugues Vivier, (Note: Amra's lawyer's name has been reported as both Hugues Vivier and Hugues Vigier) has disputed these accusations.

On 14 April 2020, he was sentenced to three months in prison by the Evreux Correctional Court for "motorized rodeos". Two years later, on 5 January, he was sentenced to three years for several crimes, including extortion, gang theft, and burglary.

On 7 May 2024, Amra was detained at the Val de Reuil prison after he was found guilty for burglary and given a prison sentence of 18 months. The burglaries, which occurred in 2019, consisted of Amra breaking into supermarkets and restaurants and stealing around 200 bottles of alcoholic beverages and around €7,500 in cash. He is suspected of using Signal, an encrypted messaging app, to organize kidnappings and extortions through his cell. He required high security during transfers despite not being seen as a high-risk inmate, with his escorts initially consisting of three guards but later being increased to five. Amra attempted to escape detention by sawing through his prison cell's bars and using tape to conceal it, but was caught by guards and placed in solitary confinement as a result.

On 15 May 2025, an official complaint from the Romanian authorities was received by the French authorities. He is suspected of having intended to use cryptocurrency to bribe Romanian police officers and secure his release.

== Escape ==
Location of the ambush
Incarville toll booth

2024 Normandy shootout
- Location: Incarville, Normandy, France
- Weapon: Rifles
- Deaths: 2
- Injuries: 3

On 14 May 2024, Amra was being transported to Évreux prison following a court hearing in Rouen. At 10:57 a.m, the convoy was ambushed at the Incarville tollbooth on the A154 freeway, 30 kilometres (19 mi) southeast of Rouen. CCTV footage showed a black Peugeot 5008, which had earlier been reported stolen, ram a white prison van head-on while it passed through the tollbooth. Another prison vehicle which followed the van got stuck. Two men then exited the Peugeot, while two other men exited a white Audi A5 which had been following the convoy. The men, masked with balaclavas and wearing black sports apparel, began to open fire at the convoy with automatic rifles. Between 30 and 40 shots were fired at the guards, who were armed with SIG Sauer handguns. The ambush lasted for at least two minutes, before the gunmen fled with Amra in the Audi and a BMW 5 Series vehicle, which were later burned at other locations.

Two prison officers were killed in the shooting, while three others were seriously wounded, including one in critical condition. The incident was the first time French prison officers were killed on duty since 1992. One of the officers killed was described by Paris prosecutor Laure Beccuau as a "captain in the prison service". One of the gunmen fired a double tap shot into a victim's head to confirm their death.

Vivier told BFM TV that he was shocked about the jailbreak, and saw Amra as "perfectly normal". Vivier said that he would like to believe that Amra did not plan the escape as it did not match what he knew of him.

Right-wing politicians said that the incident showed that the centrist French government could not control drug crime and compared France to other nations with rampant gang violence. Centre-right opposition leader Bruno Retailleau said, "We're on a path to Mexicanisation," while far-right Marion Marechal offered condolences to the guards and said that the ambush gave France the impression of being in a third-world country.

== Manhunt ==
More than 450 police officers and gendarmes were deployed in Eure to take part in the manhunt for Amra and the gunmen who freed him. Roadblocks were set up in northwestern France. Interior Minister Gérald Darmanin said, "We are progressing a lot" in the manhunt, and expressed hope that he could be caught in the coming days. There are fears that he will attempt to cross the border into the Maghreb or Spain, according to gendarme general Jacques Morel. On the third day of the search, Darmanin said that over 350 investigators were mobilized to participate.

French Prime Minister Gabriel Attal vowed to find and punish the gang, saying they would "pay for what they have done," and President Emmanuel Macron threatened that their treatment would be "uncompromising." Darmanin said that unprecedented efforts were being taken to ensure the gang's arrest.

Interpol issued a red notice for Amra, formally requesting international police to locate and arrest him, but clarified that it was not an international arrest warrant.

On 22 February 2025, Amra was arrested in an operation by Romanian police in Bucharest, despite having dyed his hair red to avoid detection. He was extradited to France on 25 February.

On 24 March, French authorities detained 24 people for questioning as a part of an inquiry into Amra's escape, including rapper Koba LaD, who was already in prison awaiting trial due to a fatal car accident in 2024.

On 24 July 2025, Amra was transferred to Vendin-le-Vieil supermax prison.
