= Crown of Empress Eugénie =

Consort crown made for Eugénie de Montijo

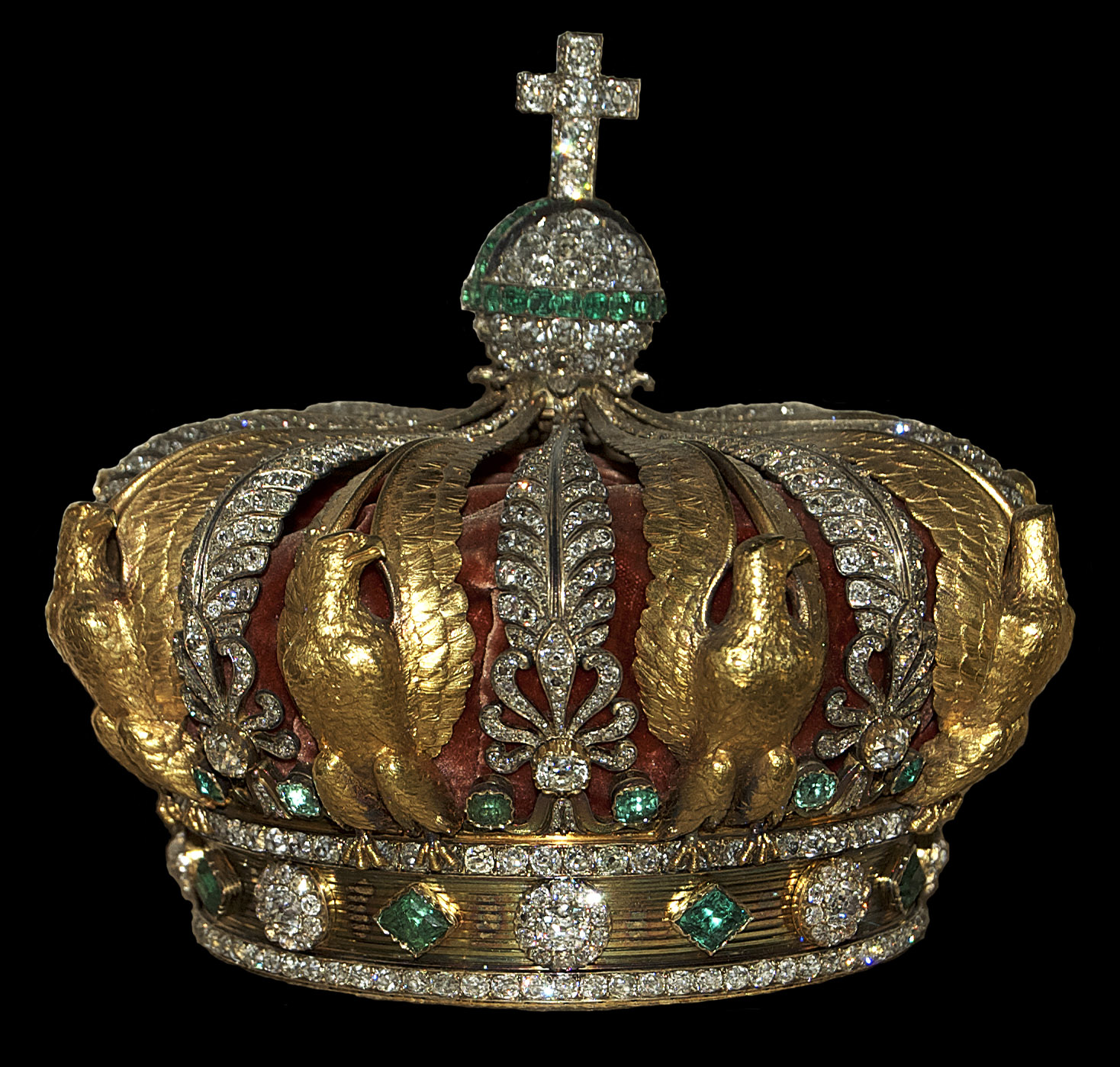
- The crown in 2014

Details
- Country: French Empire
- Made: 1855
- Owner: France
- Arches: 8
- Material: Gold; Silver-gilt
- Notable stones: 1354 diamonds 56 emeralds

The Crown of Empress Eugénie is the consort crown that was made for Eugénie de Montijo, empress consort of Napoleon III, Emperor of the French. Although neither she or her husband had a coronation ceremony, a crown was specially created for her on the occasion of the 1855 Exposition Universelle in Paris. The gold crown is set with diamonds and emeralds in eagle and palmette motifs, and is topped by a monde.

During the same period, a crown was made for Napoleon III, which was known as the Crown of Napoleon III. After her husband was overthrown in 1870, following the Franco-Prussian War, they lived in exile at Chislehurst in England. He died in January 1873, and she died in July 1920.

Most of the French Crown Jewels were sold by the Third Republic in 1885, including the Crown of Napoleon III. However, the Crown of Empress Eugénie was returned to the former empress, who bequeathed it to Princess Marie-Clotilde Bonaparte. It subsequently came up for auction in 1988, after which it was donated by Roberto Polo to the Louvre museum in Paris. It was displayed there until 19 October 2025, when it was stolen in the 2025 Louvre robbery. The crown was damaged as the thieves tried to remove it through a narrow hole in the display case, and was dropped on the sidewalk outside of the museum. Louvre president Laurence des Cars described the ability to restore the crown as "delicate but possible".

As of February 2026, the Louvre is soliciting bids for restoring the crown, which has been "badly deformed" and missing one of its eight golden eagles but retains all 56 of its emeralds and all but 10 of its 1,354 diamonds.
