= The Road from Sèvres =

Painting by Jean-Baptiste-Camille Corot

The Road from Sèvres. View from Paris
- Le chemin de Sèvres. Vue sur Paris (French)
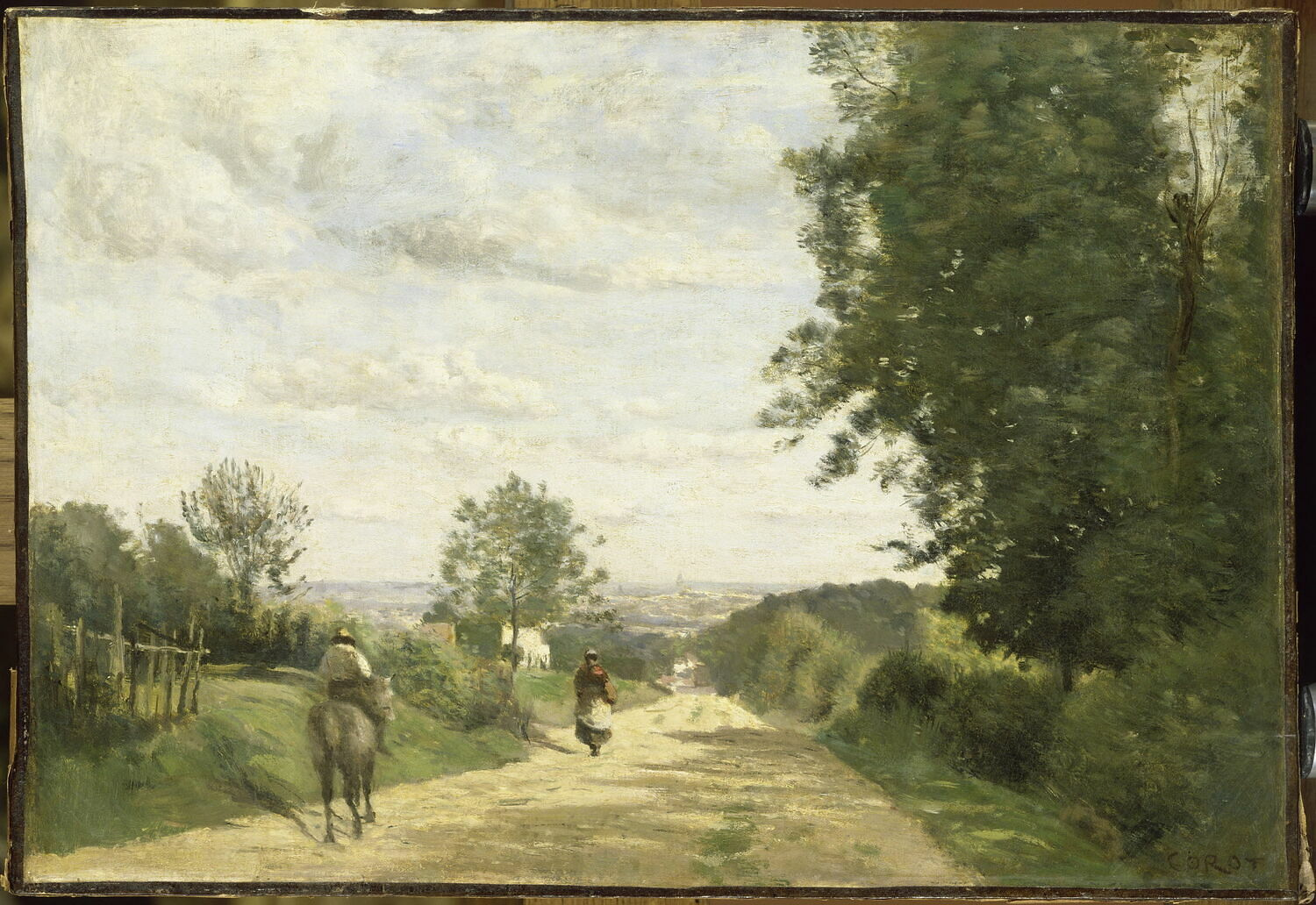
- Artist: Jean-Baptiste-Camille Corot
- Year: 1850s
- Type: Oil on canvas
- Dimensions: 34 cm × 49 cm (13 in × 19 in)
- Location: Louvre Museum (stolen), Paris
- Accession: RF 1352
- Website: Louvre collections

The Road from Sèvres, full title The Road from Sèvres. View from Paris, is an oil on canvas painting by the French painter Jean-Baptiste-Camille Corot, painted in the 1850s. The painting was part of the collection of a French art collector named Georges Thomy-Thierry, and entered the collection of the Louvre Museum in 1902 after his death as per his request. The work was valued at 12,000 francs (87,200 USD, 2025) at the time of its acquisition. The painting was stolen from the museum on 3 May 1998. The stolen painting has not been found as of 2026.

== Theft ==
Le chemin de Sèvres was stolen from the Louvre Museum on 3 May 1998 by removing pegs from behind its frame. The painting’s estimated value at the time was $1.3 million (equivalent to $2,600,000 in 2025). The Louvre was immediately closed and police searched hundreds of visitors. Police also fingerprinted the painting's frame and glass. The Society of Friends of the Louvre posted a reward of 100,000 francs (equivalent to $16,000 at the time) for information leading to the recovery of the painting. The stolen painting has not been recovered and remains missing.

This theft followed a series of other thefts at the Louvre. A previous art theft from the Louvre occurred on 7 January 1998, when a Greek votive stele dedicated to Zeus Meilichios from the 4th century BC was stolen. Daims dans un paysage by Lancelot-Théodore Turpin de Crissé was stolen on 11 January 1995 and Portrait de Jean Dorieu by Robert Nanteuil was stolen on 10 July 1994.

Following the theft of Le chemin de Sèvres, security was increased and no further artworks were reported stolen from the Louvre until a robbery on 19 October 2025.
