= Laurence des Cars =

French art historian (born 1966)

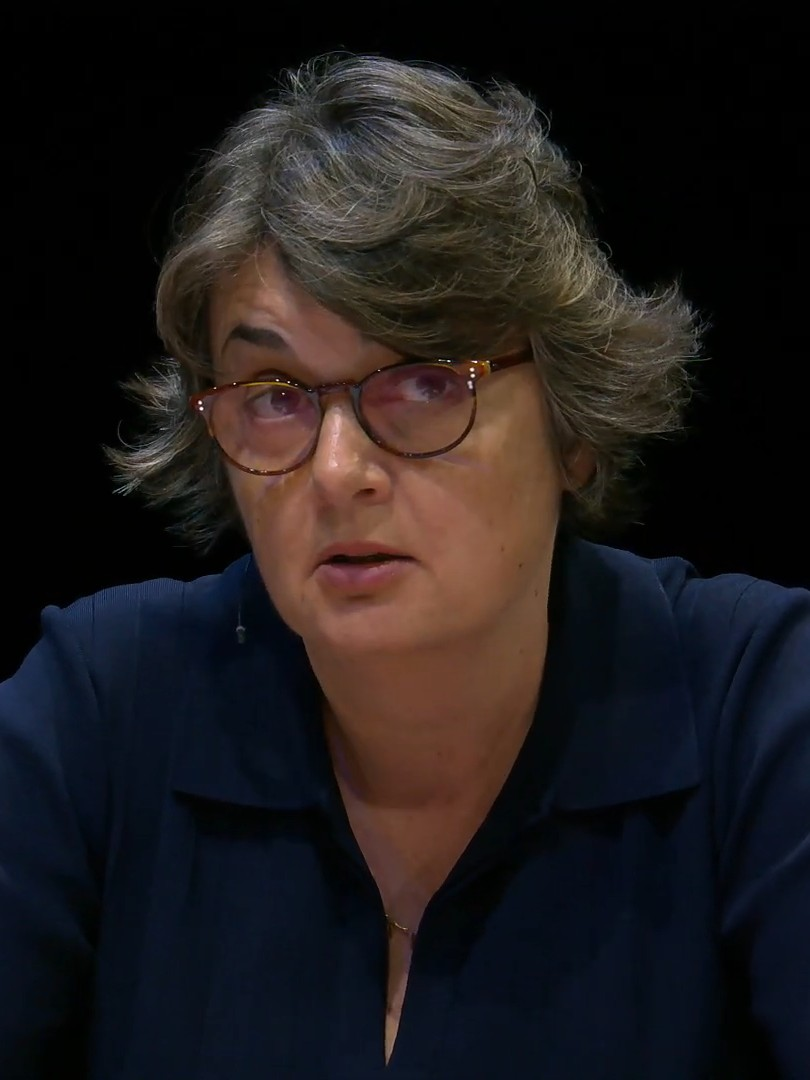
- Des Cars in 2023
- Born: Laurence Élisabeth de Pérusse des Cars; 13 June 1966 (age 60); Antony, France
- Education: École du Louvre, Sorbonne University
- Occupations: Museum curator, art historian
- Employer(s): Musée du Louvre, Paris

Laurence des Cars (born Laurence Élisabeth de Pérusse des Cars on 13 June 1966) is a French museum curator and art historian. Between September 2021 and February 2026, she served as director of the Louvre Museum, having previously headed the Musée d'Orsay and the Musée de l'Orangerie, all located in Paris, France.

== Early life and education ==
Des Cars was born in Antony in the southern suburbs of Paris. She is the daughter of the journalist and writer Jean des Cars and granddaughter of the novelist Guy des Cars (himself the second son of François de Pérusse des Cars, 5th Duc des Cars). She studied art history at Paris-Sorbonne University and the École du Louvre.

== Career ==
Upon graduating, Des Cars joined the Institut national du patrimoine and took her first position as curator at the Musée d'Orsay in 1994. She is a specialist on the art of the nineteenth century and early twentieth century. She is the author of numerous illustrated essays, including the book Les Préraphaélites : Un modernisme à l'anglaise on the Pre-Raphaelites for the Découvertes Gallimard collection.

Des Cars was appointed scientific director of the Agence France-Muséums in July 2007, the agency in charge of the development of the Louvre Abu Dhabi. She was also promoted to General Curator of Heritage in 2011 and was appointed director of the Musée de l'Orangerie in January 2014, by the Minister of Culture, Aurélie Filippetti. On 27 February 2017, she was officially appointed director of the Musée d'Orsay by President François Hollande.

Des Cars was appointed as director of the Louvre Museum on 1 September 2021, making her the first woman to hold the position in the establishment's 228-year history.

On 24 February 2026 it was announced that president Macron accepted her resignation as director of the Louvre.

== 2025 Musée du Louvre jewellery theft ==
Under her direction, on the morning of 19 October 2025, the Musée du Louvre announced that it would be closed for the day "for exceptional reasons". According to the Ministry of Culture and media reports, a theft had occurred at the Galerie d’Apollon, a gallery where jewellery from the French Crown Jewels collection were on display. These included nine items said to have belonged to Napoleon and the Empress Joséphine, such as a necklace, a tiara and a brooch. The incident raised significant concerns regarding the security of national patrimony and cultural heritage, and an investigation was launched.

During a Senate hearing Des Cars confirmed that she had offered her resignation, but it was declined, with an official telling the media that "It would be counter-productive to cut off a head today, if it's not the right one".

== Honours ==
Des Cars is a chevalier of the Legion of Honour, the National Order of Merit, and an Officer of the Order of Arts and Letters. On 1 December 2022, she was among the guests invited to the state dinner hosted by U.S. President Joe Biden in honour of President Emmanuel Macron at the White House.

== Publications ==
- Les Préraphaélites : Un modernisme à l'anglaise, collection « Découvertes Gallimard » (nº 368), série Arts. Éditions Gallimard, 1999
  - UK edition – The Pre-Raphaelites: Romance and Realism, 'New Horizons' series. Thames & Hudson, 2000 (reprinted 2004, 2010, 2011)
  - US edition – The Pre-Raphaelites: Romance and Realism, "Abrams Discoveries" series. Harry N. Abrams, 2000
- Gérôme : De la peinture à l'image, coll. « Découvertes Gallimard Hors série ». Éditions Gallimard, 2010
- Louvre Abu Dhabi : Naissance d'un musée, coll. « Catalogue d'exposition ». Louvre éditions and Éditions Flammarion, 2013
  - Louvre Abu Dhabi: Birth of a Museum, Flammarion, 2014

=== Collective work ===
- AA.VV., Manet, inventeur du Moderne, « Livres d'Art ». Éditions Gallimard, 2011
  - Manet: The Man Who Invented Modernity, Gallimard, 2011
- AA.VV., Apollinaire : Le regard du poète, « Livres d'Art ». Éditions Gallimard, 2016

== Exhibitions ==
As a teacher at the École du Louvre, she organised exhibitions for various museums, including:

- 'L'Origine du monde, autour d'un chef-d'œuvre de Courbet' (Musée d'Orsay, 1996)
- 'Jean-Paul Laurens, peintre d'histoire' (Musée d'Orsay, Musée des Augustins, 1997–1998)
- 'Edward Burne-Jones' (Metropolitan Museum of Art, Birmingham Museum, Musée d'Orsay, 1998–1999)
- 'Courbet et la Commune' (Musée d'Orsay, 2000)
- 'Thomas Eakins, un réaliste américain' (Philadelphia Museum of Art, Musée d'Orsay, The Metropolitan Museum of Art, 2001–2002)
- 'Édouard Vuillard' (National Gallery of Art, Montreal Museum of Fine Arts, Galeries nationales du Grand Palais, Royal Academy of Arts, 2003–2004)
- 'Gustave Courbet' (Galeries nationales du Grand Palais, The Metropolitan Museum of Art, Musée Fabre, 2007–2008)
- 'Jean-Léon Gérôme' (Getty Museum, Musée d'Orsay, Thyssen-Bornemisza Museum, 2010–2011)
- 'Louvre Abou Dhabi, Naissance d'un musée' (Manarat Al Saadiyat Museum, Musée du Louvre, 2013–2014)
- 'Attaquer le soleil : Hommage au marquis de Sade' (Musée d'Orsay, 2014–2015)
- 'Apollinaire, le regard du poète' (Musée de l'Orangerie, 2016)
- 'La peinture américaine des années 1930' (Musée de l'Orangerie, 2016–2017)
