= Hortensia diamond =

Peach colored diamond, formerly part of the French Crown Jewels

Hortensia Diamond
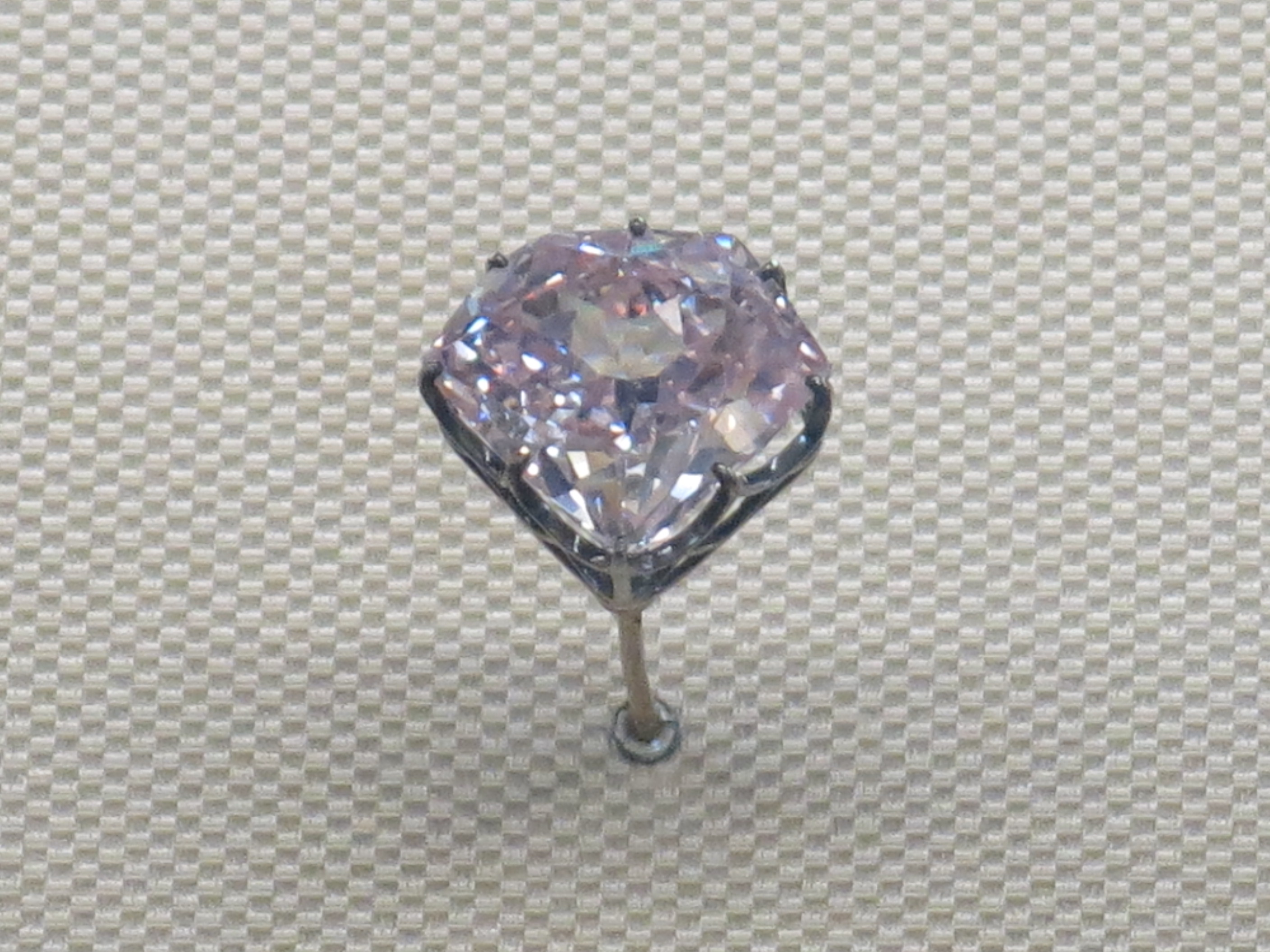
- The Hortensia
- Weight: 21.32 carats (4.264 g)
- Color: Pale orange-pink
- Cut: five-sided
- Country of origin: India
- Discovered: Unknown
- Cut by: Unknown
- Original owner: Louis XIV of France
- Owner: Louvre
- Estimated value: Unknown

The Hortensia diamond was mined in India as one of the Golconda Diamonds, and is part of the French Crown Jewels. It is a 20 carat diamond of pale orange-pink colour, cut into a five-sided shape, and with a "feather" (a fine visible crack) running from its tip to its girdle.

== History ==
The Hortensia was purchased by King Louis XIV of France in 1643 and was in his custody until 1715. It was stolen in 1792 during the unrest of the French Revolution from the Garde-Meuble de la Couronne in Paris (today the Hôtel de la Marine), where royal art and furniture was stored and administered. It was recovered from an attic in the Parisian district of Les Halles in a bag together with other crown jewels, among them the Regent Diamond. An apocryphal account states that its location was given up in the confession of a man shortly before his execution. It was stolen again in 1830, this time from the Ministry of the Navy, but recovered shortly thereafter.

It acquired its name in the early 1800s from Hortense de Beauharnais, Queen of Holland, stepdaughter of Napoleon I and mother of Napoleon III. Notably Hortense never owned the diamond or even wore it, and it remains a matter of speculation why it was named for her. During the First French Empire, the Hortensia was worn by Napoleon on his epaulette braid. Around 1856, the diamond was set into a headband for the wife of Napoleon III, Empress Eugénie, by court jeweller Christophe-Frédéric Bapst.

In 1887, the Third French Republic sold most crown jewels to quell fears of a royalist coup d'état, from which only jewels of historic significance were exempted. Due to its history, the diamond was one of these, alongside the Regent Diamond, the Mazarin diamonds and others. The Hortensia is on display at the Galerie d'Apollon of the Louvre museum in Paris.

== Replica ==
A full-sized replica of the 20.53 carat Hortensia diamond was recreated in 2026 by expert gem cutter Scott Sucher for the first time, out of a lab-grown diamond.

== See also ==
- List of diamonds
