= René Moreu =

French painter (1920–2020)

- Born: 11 November 1920; Nice, France
- Died: 16 May 2020 (aged 99)
- Occupations: Painter; Illustrator

René Moreu (11 November 1920 – 16 May 2020) was a French painter and illustrator.

== Biography ==
Born in Nice, Moreu spent his childhood in Marseille, where his father decorated windows and subsequently managed a cafe. After working in a few small trades, he was hired as a mechanic in the printing shop of Le Petit Marseillais. Requisitioned on a coast guard ship, Moreu joined the French Resistance in 1940. Although he had a retinal disease, he still participated in the Liberation of Paris. After World War II, he joined the newspaper La Marseillaise.

Moreu was hired by Vaillant and worked for the newspaper from 1945 to 1949. He married the director of Éditions Vaillant, Madeleine Bellet and remained close to the editorial staff of the newspaper, where he was a shareholder until the 1970s. In 1950 and 1951, he created the newspapers Riquiqui les belles images and Roudoudou les belles images, aimed at the entertainment of young children. He also contributed to Pipolin les gaies Images.

Moreu became an illustrator and painter following placenta implants to help repair his eyesight. He illustrated numerous children's books with the publisher Éditions La Farandole, and with the authors Pierre Gamarra and Jean Ollivier. In 1983, he published Arnal une vie de Pif, a biography of Spiff and Hercules creator José Cabrero Arnal. He also worked for the communist press, with magazine Miroir du cyclisme and journal Almanach ouvrier et paysan from 1967 to 1986.

As a painter, he was a part of the group L'Œuf sauvage and was attached to the Art Singulier movement. He made his first exhibition in 1975 in Amiens. Several retrospectives have been dedicated to Moreu's work, such as Compiègne in 2001, Halle Saint-Pierre in 2003 and 2004, Saint-Pierreville in 2003, Uzès in 2010, Bègles and Carennac in 2011, and Thiverval-Grignon in 2015.

René Moreu died on 16 May 2020 at the age of 99. The first monograph for his works is scheduled to be published by Actes Sud in June 2020, titled L'œil nu : que la nature soit peinture.
