= Galerie d'Apollon =

Room in the Louvre

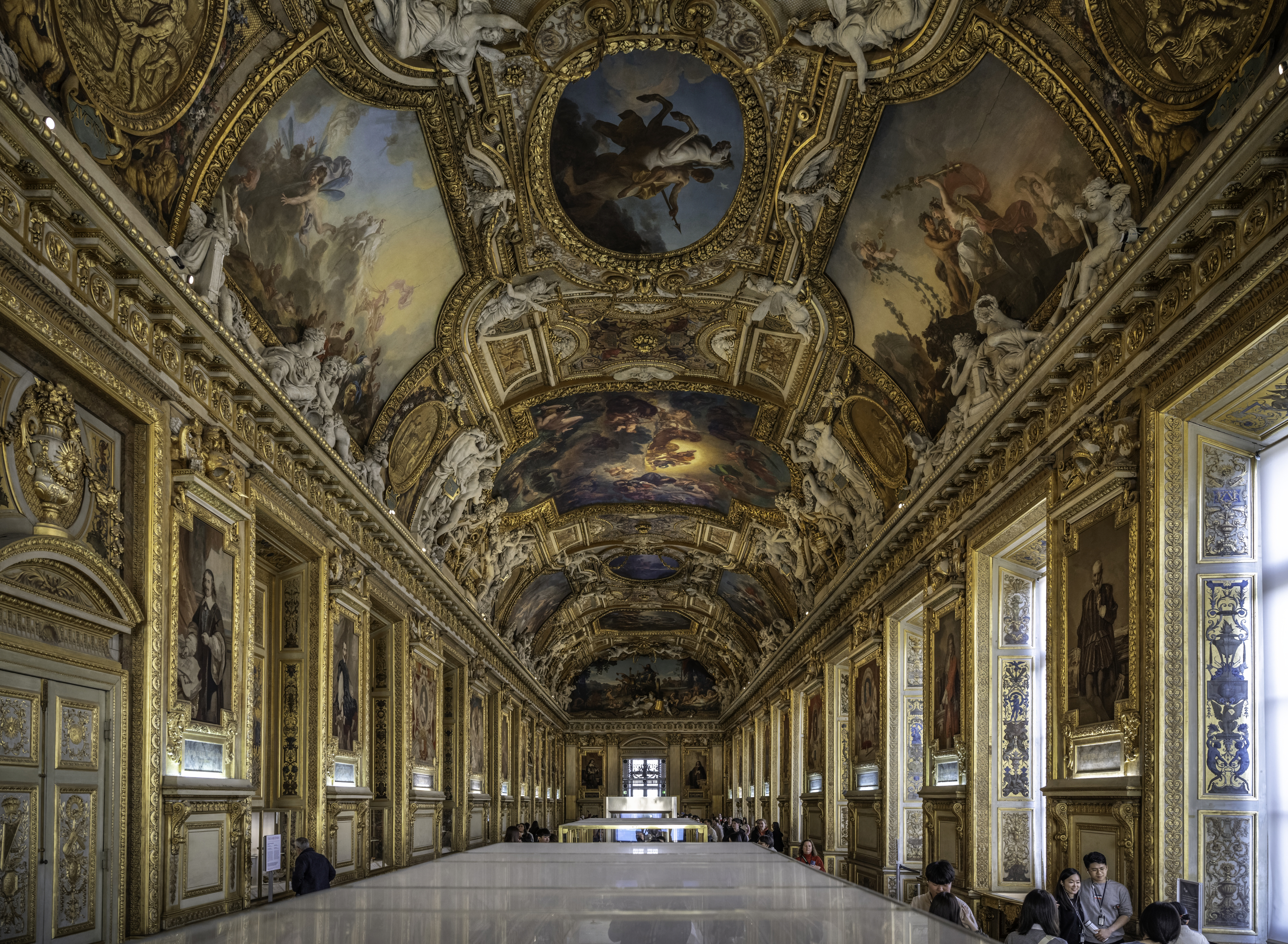
The Galerie d'Apollon in 2024

The Galerie d'Apollon (French pronunciation: [ɡalʁi dapɔlɔ̃]) is a large room of the Louvre Palace, on the first floor of a wing known as the Petite Galerie. Its current setup was first designed in the 1660s. It has been part of the Louvre Museum since the 1790s, was completed under the lead of Félix Duban in the mid-19th century, and has housed the museum's collection of the French Crown Jewels since 1887.

== History ==
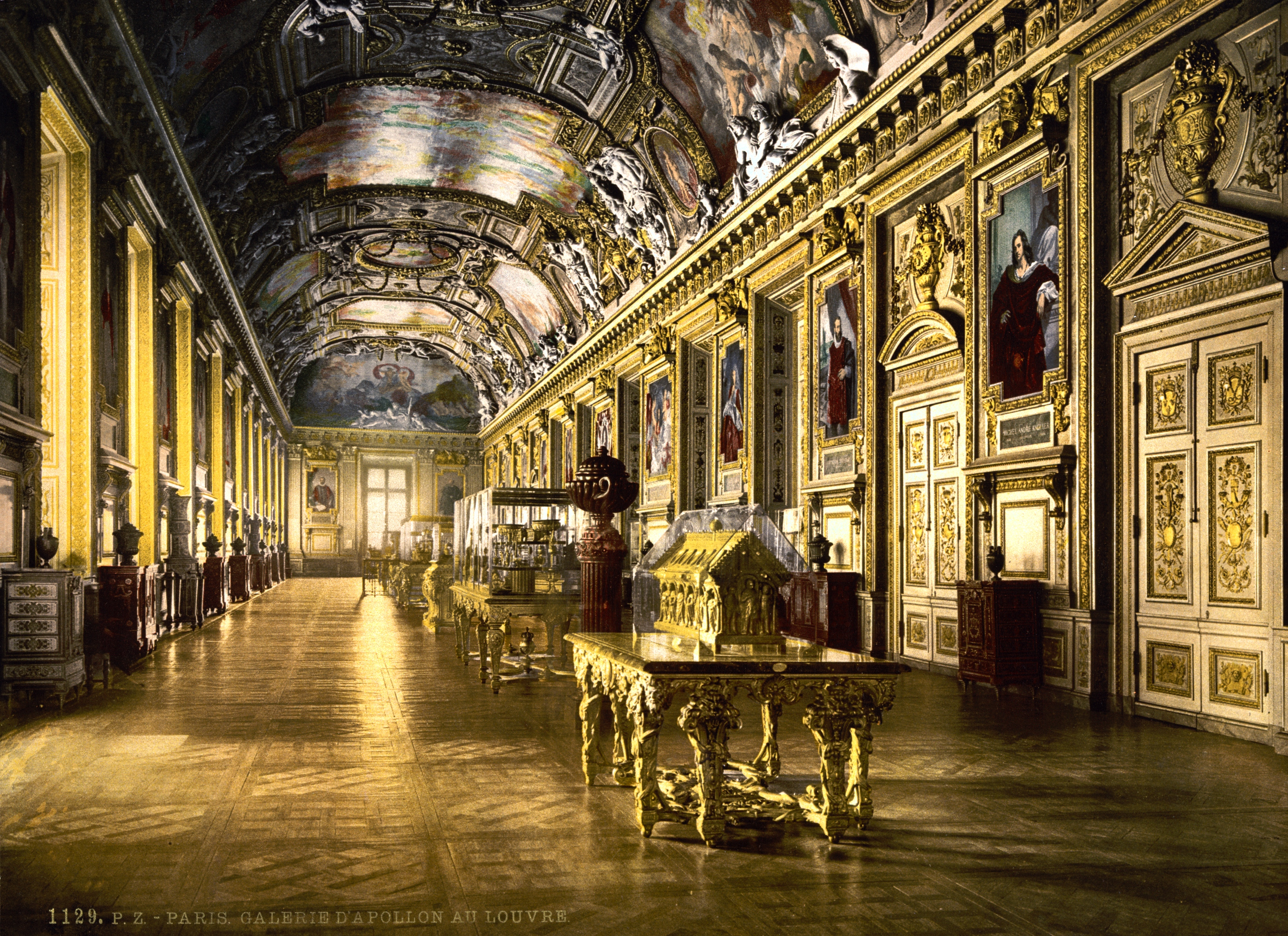
The Galerie d'Apollon in 1900

The Petite Galerie of the Louvre was first built in the 16th century. A second storey with a long room for the display of art was added during the reign of Henry IV. Known as the Galerie des Rois, it was decorated by artists of the Second School of Fontainebleau, including Toussaint Dubreuil, Jacob Bunel and his wife Marguerite Bahuche, according to designs by Martin Fréminet.

After a fire in the small gallery destroyed much of it on 6 February 1661, Louis XIV ordered this part of the Louvre to be rebuilt. Architectural work was entrusted to Louis Le Vau, who carried out reconstruction activities between 1661 and 1663, while Charles Le Brun was assigned responsibility for decorations by Jean-Baptiste Colbert. Le Brun's main theme for the room revolved around the movement of the sun through time and space, with the figure of Apollo glorifying Louis as the sun king. The sculptor François Girardon was responsible for the stucco sculptures. This was the first Royal Gallery for Louis, which served as a model for the Hall of Mirrors of the Palace of Versailles.

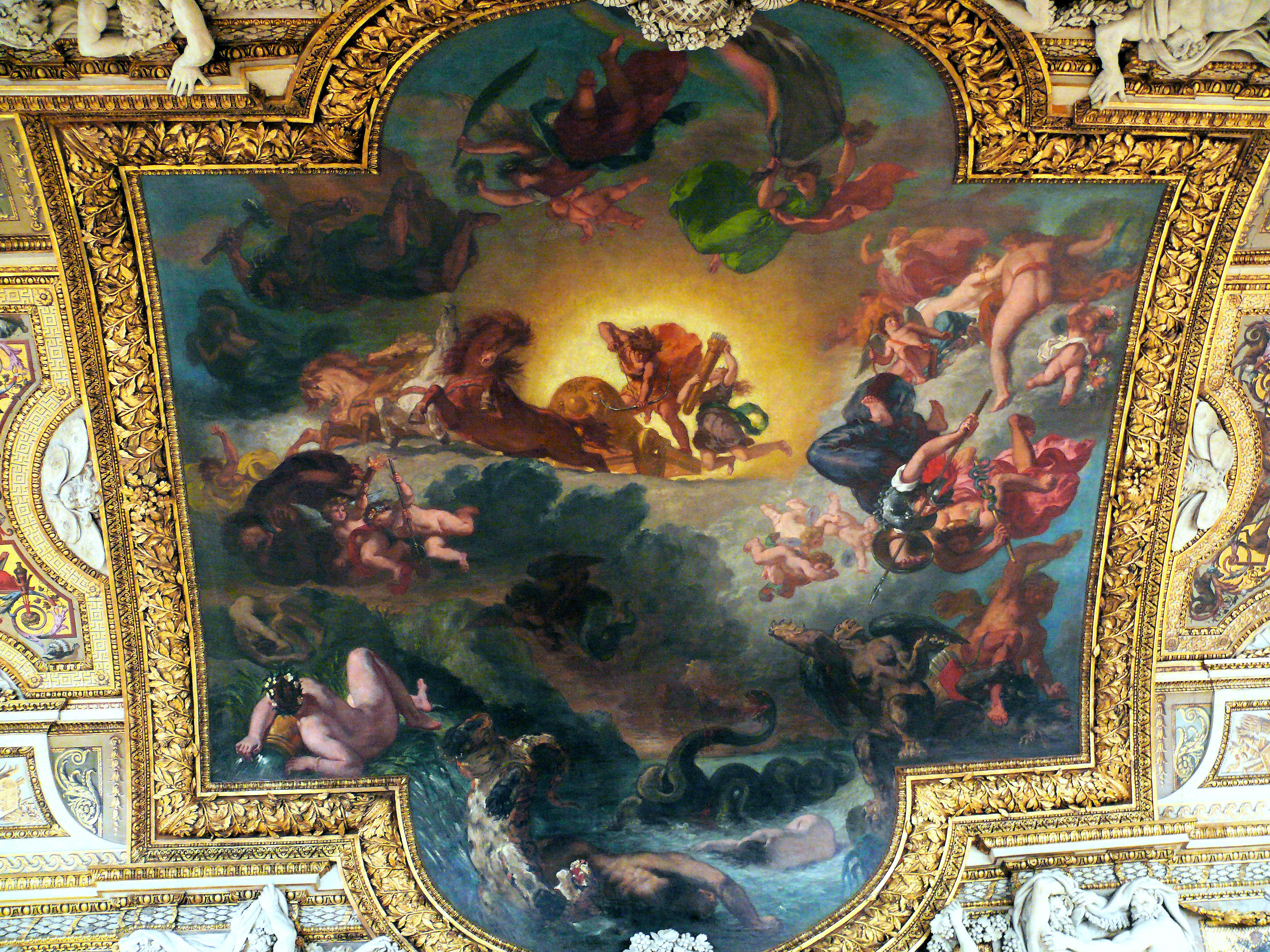
Apollo Slays the Python by Eugène Delacroix

The gallery had not been completed by the time of Louis' death in 1715, and subsequent generations of artists continued to improve the room, such as Gaspard and Balthazard Marsy, and Thomas Regnaudin. In 1819, Louvre architect Pierre Fontaine closed it with a wrought iron gate that had been seized in early 1797 from the Château de Maisons, still in place. But the gallery was left unfinished and in disrepair, however, and it had to be propped up in 1826. It was eventually restored and completed in the mid-19th century under architect Félix Duban, with painter Eugène Delacroix contributing Apollo Slays the Python for the center of the ceiling, Joseph Guichard painting Triumph of the Earth or Cybele, and Charles Louis Müller supplying Aurore. The newly completed gallery was inaugurated by President Louis-Napoléon Bonaparte on 5 June 1851.

Having seen the Gallery in 1856, a 13-year-old Henry James wrote:

the wondrous Galerie d'Apollon...drawn out for me as a long but assured initiation and seeming to form, with its supreme coved ceiling and inordinately shining parquet, a prodigious tube or tunnel through which I inhaled little by little, that is again and again, a general sense of glory. The glory meant ever so many things at once, not only beauty and art and supreme design, but history and fame and power, the world in fine raised to the richest and noblest expression.

As part of the Louvre, the Galerie d'Apollon is both a national and World Heritage Site. It was comprehensively renovated between 2001 and 2004, and again cleaned up in 2019. On 19 October 2025, eight items in the gallery were stolen.

== Displays ==
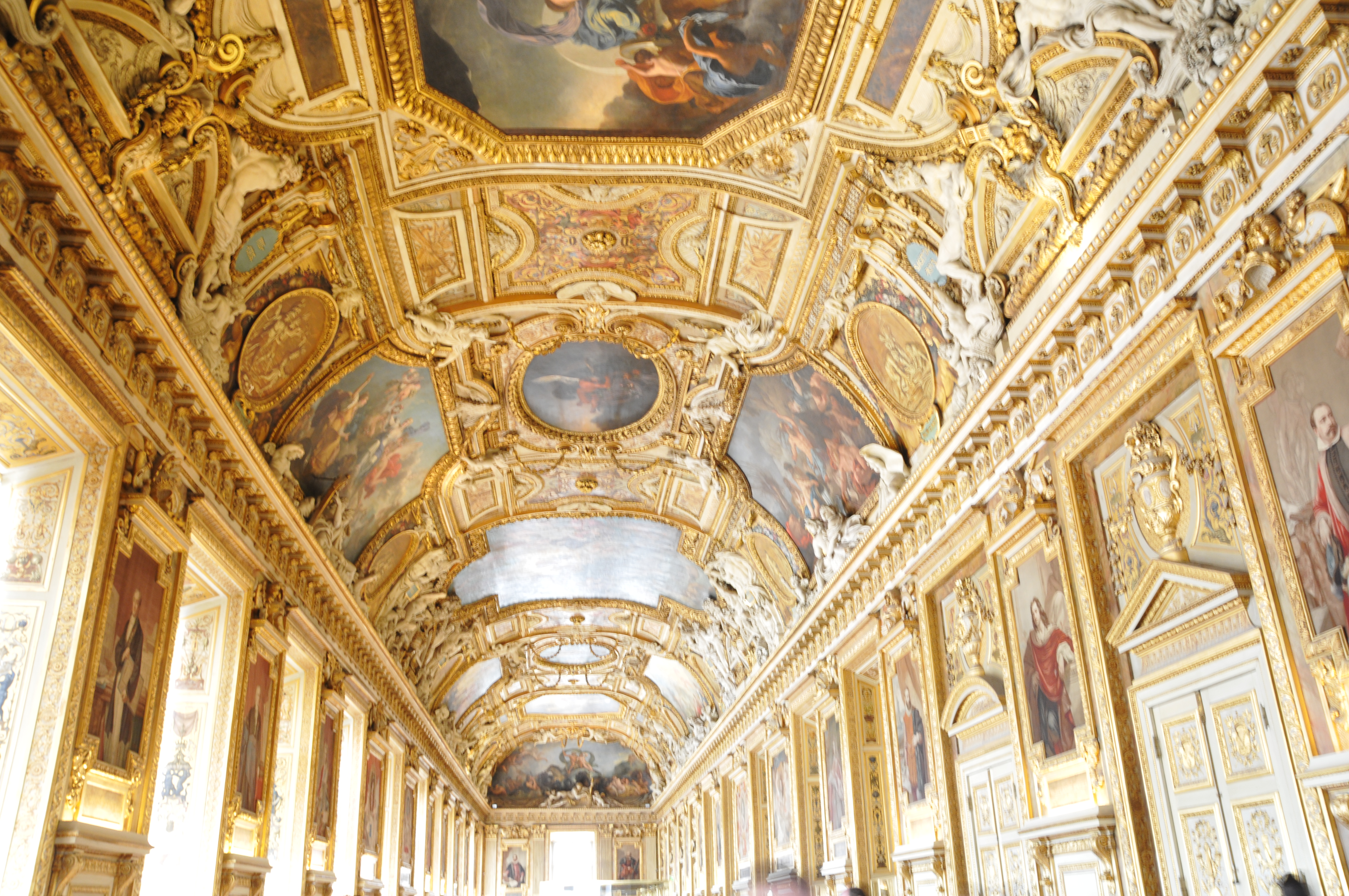
Decorated ceiling of the Apollo Gallery

Besides the sumptuous decoration of the room itself, the gallery's main attractions are the remaining pieces of the French Crown Jewels. In 1887, the Third French Republic sold most crown jewels to quell fears of a royalist coup d'état, from which only jewels of historic significance were exempted. That same year, the 23 remaining pieces of jewellery were exhibited in the Galerie d'Apollon, and presented in display cases designed by Louvre architect Edmond Guillaume, together with other precious objects from the Louvre's collections. More display cases were added in 1985 (designed by Daniel Pasgrimaud) and in 2020 (designed by Juan Felipe Alarcon). Some of the most significant pieces include:

- crowns made for Louis XV and Napoleon;
- the Hortensia diamond, an orange-pink 20-carat diamond purchased by Louis XIV;
- the Regent Diamond, a white 140-carat diamond widely considered one the purest diamonds ever created;
- the Sancy, a pale yellow 55-carat diamond formerly part of the Crown Jewels of the United Kingdom.

== Theft of French crown jewels ==
On 19 October 2025, thieves disguised as construction workers stole eight pieces of the French Crown Jewels housed in the gallery and valued at approximately €88 million by breaking in through a second floor window during regular visiting hours. The robbery took less than eight minutes, of which the thieves spent four in the gallery.

== See also ==
- Galerie des Glaces – Grand central gallery in the Palace of Versailles
- Galerie dorée
