= Laure Beccuau =

French magistrate (born 1960)

- Born: 11 March 1960 (age 66); France
- Occupation: Magistrate
- Years active: 1984–present

Laure Beccuau (born 11 March 1960) is a French magistrate who has served as the 70th public prosecutor of Paris since 2021.

== Biography ==
Beccuau began her career as a judicial auditor (trainee magistrate) in January 1984. After completing two years of training at the French National School for the Judiciary, she was appointed substitute prosecutor of the Republic at the court in Rouen, taking up the position on 1 January 1986.

In June 1993, she was appointed first substitute prosecutor of the Republic in Chalon-sur-Saône. In November 1998, she became deputy prosecutor of the Republic in Lille, before taking up the same position in Versailles on 1 September 2002. In August 2010, she was appointed deputy prosecutor of the Republic in Bobigny, out of hierarchy. She subsequently served as prosecutor of the Republic at the court in Nîmes from 1 January 2013 and at the court in Créteil from 1 December 2016.

Beccuau succeeded Rémy Heitz as prosecutor of the Republic at the Paris Judicial Court, taking up the position on 20 September 2021. She became the first woman to head the Paris public prosecutor's office.

Beccuau has been involved in investigations into sexual abuse in French schools highlighted by the #MeToo École movement (also known as #MeToo School). In 2026, she stated that more than 100 nurseries, day-care centres and primary schools were under investigation.
