= Hiéron Museum =

Museum in France

Coordinates: 46°27′07″N 4°07′23″E

- Musée du Hiéron
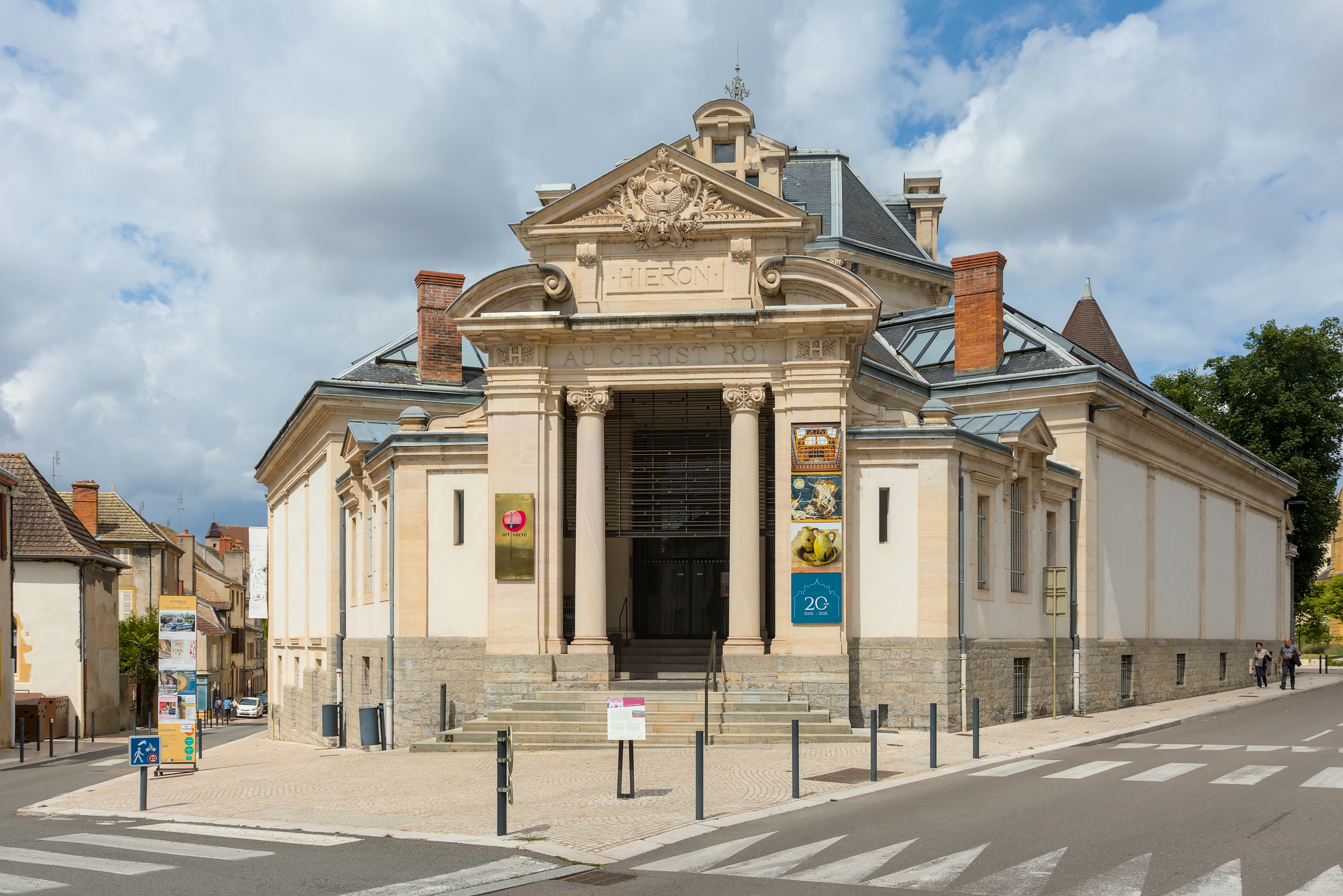
- Website: musee-hieron.fr

The Hiéron Museum is a French museum of religious art located in the town of Paray-le-Monial, in southern Burgundy. It is officially designated as a Museum of France and has been listed as a historic monument since 21 December 2015.
