= French Blue =

French Blue or French blue may refer to:

- French blue (color), a shade of blue
- French Blue (airline), formerly French long-haul low-cost airline
- Tavernier Blue, a diamond that was part of the French crown jewels
- Hope Diamond, a diamond cut from the Tavernier
