= Eliason =

Eliason is a surname. Notable people with the surname include:

- Daniel Eliason, British diamond merchant
- Don Eliason (1918–2003), American basketball and football player
- Edwin Eliason (born 1938), American archer
- Frank Eliason (born 1972), American corporate executive and author
- Ian Eliason (1945–2019), New Zealand rugby union player
- Joyce Eliason (1934–2022), American television writer and producer
- Oscar C. Eliason (1902–1985), Swedish American clergyman
- Roy Eliason (1926–2019), Australian rules footballer
- Steve Eliason, American politician

== See also ==
- 8804 Eliason, main-belt asteroid
