= John Francillon =

John Francillon (1744–1816) was a jeweler and lapidary, an English naturalist and an entomologist of Huguenot descent.

Francillon was a London jeweller who was also a dealer in natural history specimens and paintings. He was the agent for John Abbot selling his American bird and natural history illustrations. He maintained a large insect collection. Some of his butterflies appear in the Icones of William Jones. He was a Fellow of the Linnean Society.

== The Francillon Memo ==
In September 1812 Francillon was allowed to trace around an unset 45.5-carat (9.10 g) blue cushion-shaped diamond in the possession of the diamond merchant Daniel Eliason. Francillon drew the diamond in plan and elevation, coloring the plan drawing to match the deep blue color of the stone. Below the drawings he wrote notes to explain that he had been given permission to draw the gem by its owner, Eliason, and that it was " ... a very curious superfine deep blue Diamond."

"There is other evidence which places a 44-carat blue diamond in England at least as early as 1812." George Frederick Kunz, a distinguished American gemologist, told of finding two detailed sketches of the Hope Diamond made by a Soho lapidary in 1812. As he explained in an article in The Saturday Evening Post, Kunz discovered the sketches in an old book by Pouget that he found one day while browsing in Quartich's bookshop in London.

It is now known that this rare blue diamond was once part of the missing Royal and Imperial crown jewels of France. It was commonly known as the French Blue and had been set into Louis XV's jeweled insignia for the Order of the Golden Fleece. The French Blue had been stolen on 11 September 1792 along with most of the French Crown Jewels and was never recovered.

The Francillon Memo is the first record of the diamond which would come to be known as the Hope Diamond. Francillon's drawing is dated two days after the statute of limitations for recovering French stolen property in the Napoleonic Code had expired. Who sold the stone to Eliason is unclear, as is how long it was in his possession before he allowed Francillon to view and draw it. Also a mystery is who authorized the cutting of the French Blue to form the Hope Diamond.

The Francillon Memorandum says: "The above drawing is the exact size and shape of a very curious superfine deep blue Diamond. Brilliant cut, and equal to a fine deep blue Sapphire. It is beauty full and all perfection without specks or flaws, and the color even and perfect all over the Diamond. I traced it round the diamond with a pencil by leave of Mr. Daniel Eliason and it is as finely cut as I have ever seen in a Diamond. The color of the Drawing is as near the color of the Diamond as possible. Dated: 19th September, 1812. John Francillon, No. 29 Norfolk Street, Strand, London."

The Francillon Memorandum remains in the Pouget book today, in the George Frederick Kunz Collection of the United States Geological Survey Library in Reston, Virginia. The Pouget book was donated to the USGS as part of Mr. Kunzs' private library after his death in 1933.

== Media ==
- A small image of Francillon's memorandum can be seen at PBS Treasures of the World page which provides details of the Hope Diamond's provenance.
- The Francillon Memo is pictured in highlights for a December 2010 special on the "Secrets of the Hope Diamond" for the National Geographic Channel.

== Obituary ==
"June 23 John Francillon esq. of Norfolk Street Strand a gentleman much esteemed for his amiable manners and conduct throughout life, and possessed of a superb cabinet of foreign insects the assiduous labour and cost of many years."
