= Philippe Nicolet =

Swiss film director

Philippe Nicolet (born 4 January 1953 in Lausanne), is a Swiss film director of both documentaries and fiction. Journalist and scriptwriter, he was the first editor-in-chief of the Lausanne television station before embarking on a project tracing the history of relations between Switzerland and the European Union for the Jean Monnet Foundation, of which Professor Henri Rieben was the president. In addition to documentary footage filmed in some fifty countries, he became known for his hundreds of interviews of political, scientific and artistic personages. In 2006, Nicolet began creating 3D films.

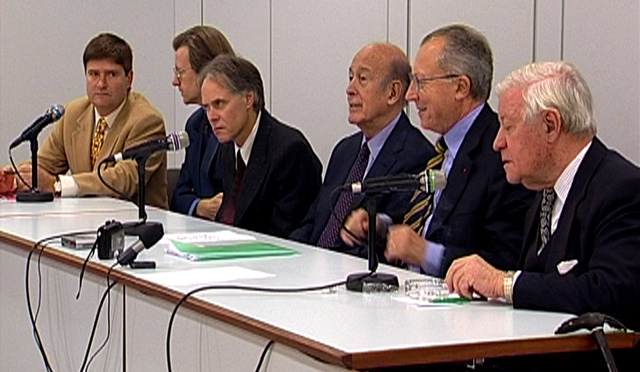
Philippe Nicolet (left) mediates a press conference of the Jean Monnet Foundation with Swiss national deputy Claude Ruey, Swiss President Moritz Leuenberger, Valéry Giscard d'Estaing, Jacques Delors and Helmut Schmidt.

== Documentaries and fiction ==
1979-2005: Video portraits. Interviews with personalities from all horizons and from all tendencies: heads of state, astronauts, artists, inventors, etc.

1994: Jeanne Calment, the oldest person in the world

1995: In prison. Docu-fiction on preventive incarceration

1996-1997: Tomorrow perhaps, science-fiction series

1997: Les terriers de la mémoire, documentary on memory.

1998: With Maurice Béjart. Reportage in Italy, Switzerland and Russia.

2000 : The Sign of the Eleventh Hour. Full-length feature film. With Nanou Duggan, Roland Carey, Jean-Pierre Althaus and Annie Chaplin

2001: Three architects of Europe. Interview about the Euro with Jacques Delors, Valéry Giscard d'Estaing and Helmut Schmidt.

2002: Rêveur (Dreamer), a series focusing on the native country of immigrants. The series was granted the patronage of the Swiss Commission for UNESCO in 2004.

2005: Travels in the Orient by the Baron of Aubonne. Documentary on Jean-Baptiste Tavernier.

2007: 3D Odyssey, docu-fiction relating the history of stereoscopy.

2008: Morocco in 3D, documentary about Morocco

2009: Australia in 3D

2010: Iran 3D: Challenge of a civilization, a documentary about Iran today

2011: The Antikythera mechanism, the fingerprints of genius (in 3D)

2011: The film: "YES - In the Present - Live From Lyon"

2012: Music Making History, Montreux Jazz Festival with Claude Nobs

2014: The Enigma of the Mountain Gorillas

2015: D-Couverte Aventicum. In the capital of the Helvetii, jewels are unveiled after 2000 years. In coproduction with RTS

2015: Looking Towards Our Origins. The mission of the large ESO telescopes in Chile
