= William Jones (naturalist) =

English naturalist and entomologist

William Jones (1745–1818) was an English naturalist and entomologist.

Jones was a wealthy wine merchant in London. His interest in natural history led to his being elected a Fellow of the Linnean Society of London in 1791. He died in Chelsea, London.

He is best known for Jones' Icones 1,500 watercolours of butterflies and some moths which is conserved in Oxford University Museum of Natural History. Until 2021, the collection was never published. Compiled by Richard Vane-Wright, also an entomologist from the Natural History Museum of London, an extensive version of Jones' work including 13 paintings and sketches and almost 1,300 illustrations of butterflies and moths from the seven original volume have been shared in print. The collection highlights the exceptional detail craftsmanship of Jones. Iconotypes: A Compendium of Butterflies and Moths, Jones' Icones Complete is now available to the public for their viewing pleasure. Jones Icones illustrates specimens from the collections of Dru Drury, Joseph Banks and John Francillon as well as a few from the British Museum and Linnean Society collections. Portions of Jones' own collection was illustrated by Elisabeth Denyer in a manuscript she later donated to the British Library.
