= Jean-Baptiste Tavernier =

17th-century French gem merchant and traveler (1605–1689)

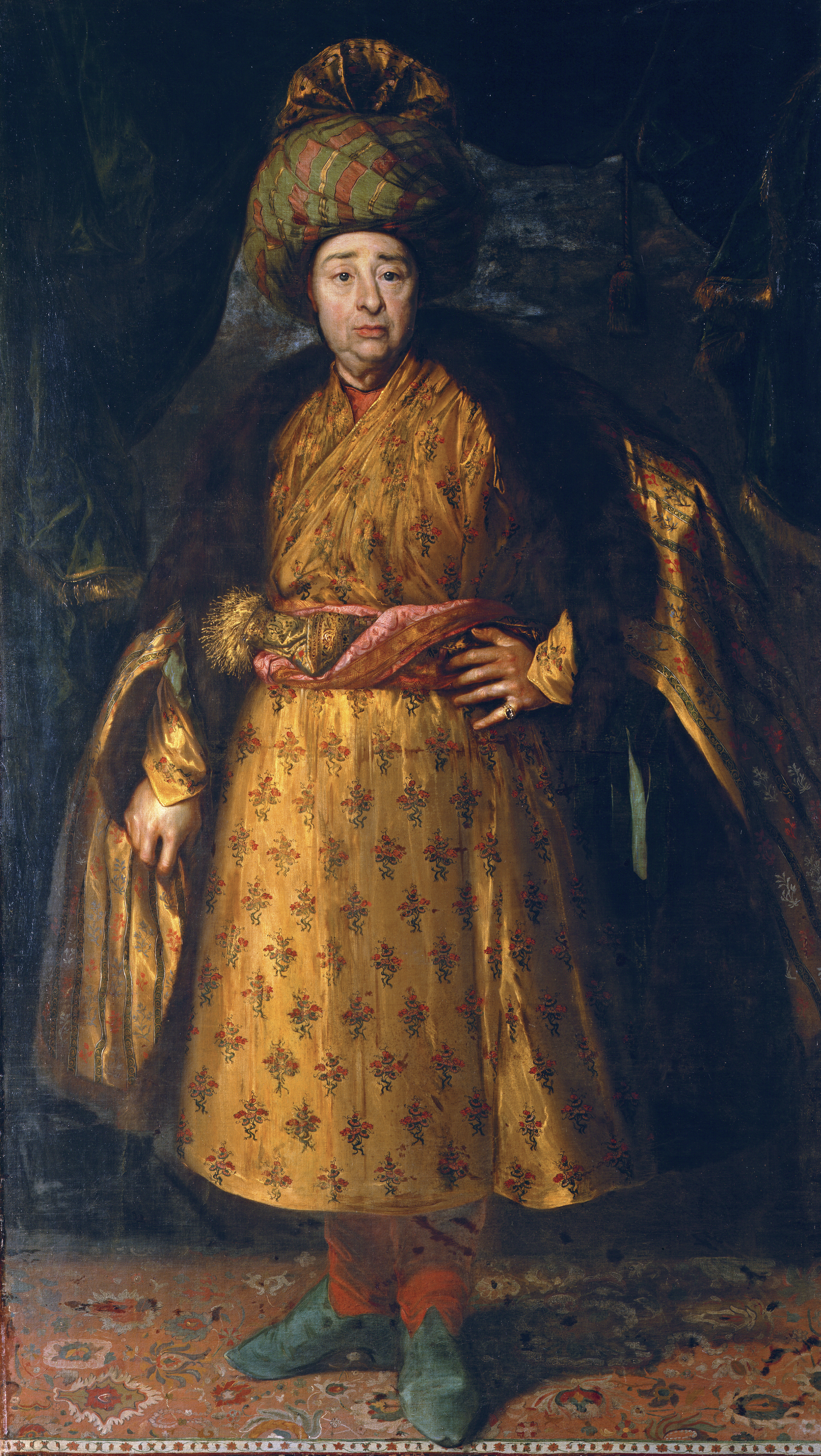
Jean-Baptiste Tavernier in oriental costume, 1679

Jean-Baptiste Tavernier (1605–1689) was a 17th-century French gem merchant and traveler. Traveling as a private merchant at his own expense, Tavernier estimated that he travelled 60,000 leagues in six voyages to Persia and India between 1630 and 1668 which he published as Les Six Voyages de Jean-Baptiste Tavernier (Six Voyages, 1676).

Tavernier is best known for his 1666 purchase of the 116-carat Tavernier Blue diamond that he subsequently sold to Louis XIV in 1668 for 120,000 livres, the equivalent of 172,000 ounces of pure gold, and a letter of ennoblement.

In 1669, Tavernier purchased the Seigneury (fief) of Aubonne, located in the Duchy of Savoy near the city of Geneva, and became Baron of Aubonne.

== Early life ==
Tavernier was born in Paris of a French or Flemish Huguenot family that had emigrated to Antwerp to escape persecution; they subsequently returned to Paris after the publication of the Edict of Nantes, which promised protection for French Protestants. Both his father Gabriel and his brother Melchior Tavernier were cartographers, and it is clear from the accuracy of his drawings that Tavernier received some instruction in the art of cartography and engraving.

The conversations he heard in his father's house inspired Tavernier with an early desire to travel, and by his sixteenth year he had already visited England, the Low Countries and Germany.

In 1624, at eighteen, Tavernier took service with the Viceroy of Hungary. By 1629, after four and a half years, he had grown restless. At the invitation of the young Duke of Rethel, to whom he had previously been briefly attached as a guide and translator, Tavernier traveled to Mantua and took service as an ensign of artillery under the duke's father, the Duke of Nevers, who was besieging the city. In the following year Tavernier traveled, as a translator, with an Irish mercenary in the service of the emperor, Colonel Walter Butler (afterwards notorious for killing Albrecht von Wallenstein).

In the Six Voyages, Tavernier states that he departed from Butler's company, in 1630, with the intention of traveling to Ratisbon (Regensburg), to attend the investiture of the son of Emperor Ferdinand II as King of the Romans. However, as the investiture did not take place until 1636, it is probable that he attended the ceremony between his first and second voyages. By his own account, he had seen Italy, Switzerland, Germany, Poland, and Hungary, as well as France, England and the Low Countries, and spoke the principal languages of these countries.

== First journey ==
Tavernier was now eager to visit the East. At Ratisbon – with the help of Père Joseph, Cardinal Richelieu's agent and éminence grise –Tavernier was able to join the retinue of a pair of French travellers, M. de Chapes and M. de St. Liebau, who had received a mission to go to the Levant. In their company he reached Constantinople early in 1631, where he spent eleven months, and then proceeded by Tokat, Erzerum, and Erivan to Safavid Persia. His farthest point in this first journey was the Persian city of Isfahan. He returned by Baghdad, Aleppo, Alexandretta, Malta, and Italy, and was again in Paris in 1633.

Of the next five years of Tavernier's life, nothing is known with certainty. However, Joret, his French biographer, claims that during this period he may have become controller of the household of Gaston, Duke of Orléans. We do know that twice during his Six Voyages he claimed the Duke's patronage.

== Second journey ==
In September 1638, Tavernier began a second journey. This journey lasted until 1643; during this expedition, he traveled via Aleppo to Persia, thence to India as far as Agra, and from there to the Kingdom of Golconda. He visited the court of the Mughal—Emperor Shah Jahan—and made his first trip to the Kollur diamond mines.

== Later voyages ==
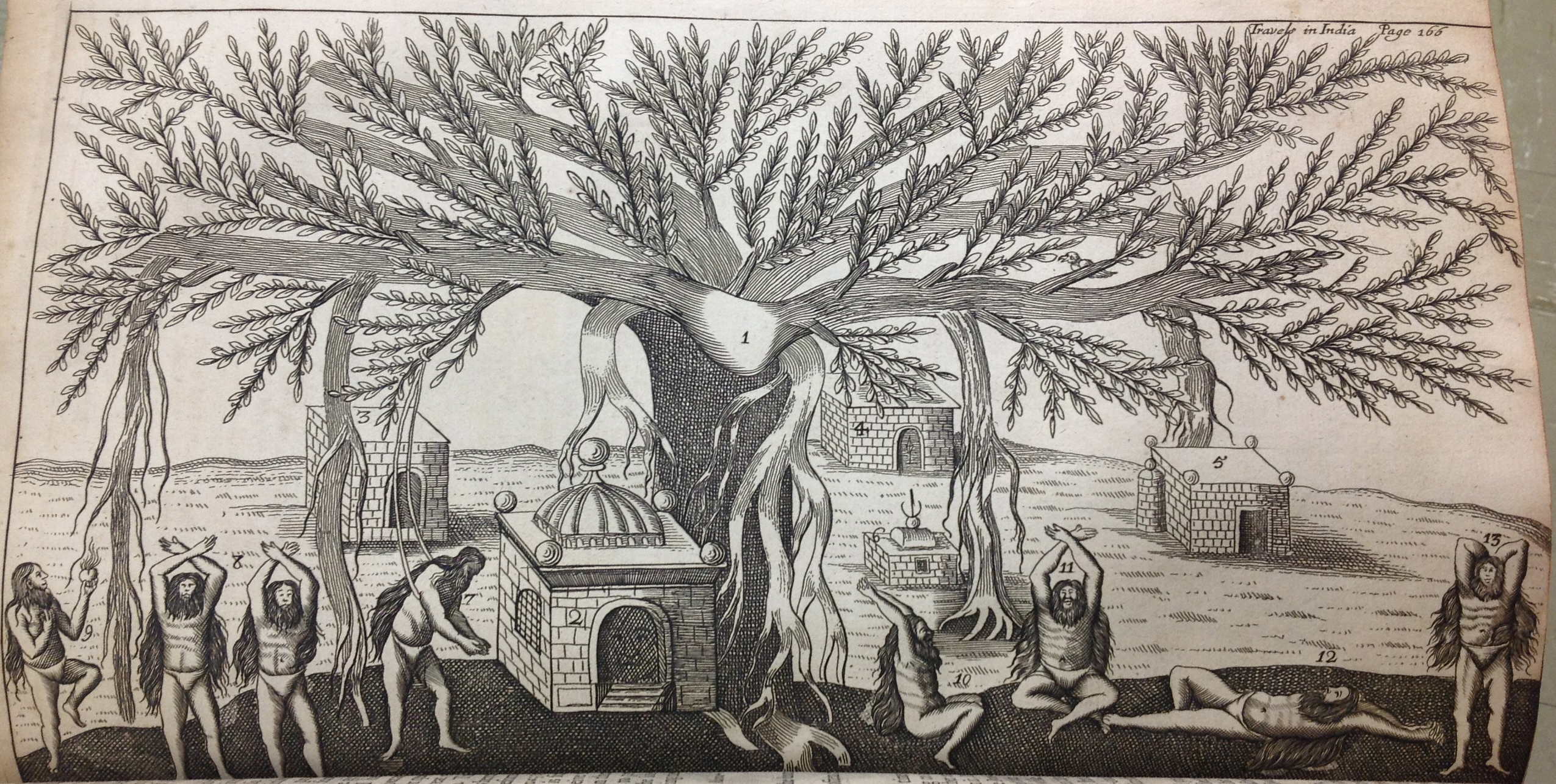
An illustration by Tavernier of Indians performing Yoga under a Banyan tree

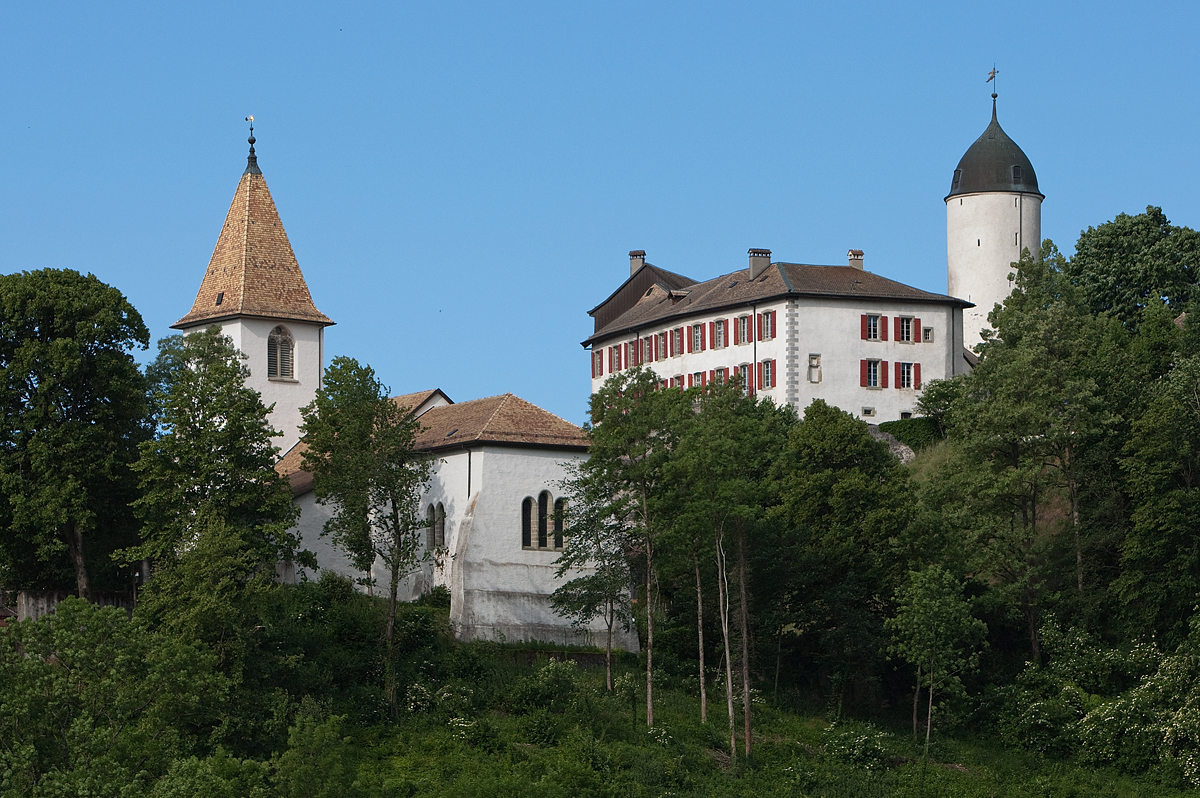
Church and castle with its minaret-style tower, built in 1680 for Tavernier, at Aubonne, Switzerland

The second journey was followed by four others. In these later voyages, Tavernier traveled as a merchant of the highest rank, trading in costly jewels and other precious wares, and finding his chief customers among the greatest princes of the East.

On his third journey (1643–49), he went as far as Java, and returned by the Cape. His relations with the Dutch proved not wholly satisfactory, and a long lawsuit on his return yielded but imperfect redress.

A fourth voyage (1651–55) took Tavernier to Alexandretta, Aleppo, Basra (where he reported on the Mandaeans, which he referred to as the "Christians of St. John"), Persian Bandar Abbas, Masulipatam, Gandikot, Golkonda, Surat, Ahmedabad, Pegu, Dagon, Ava, Mogok, back to Bandar Abbas and Isfahan, thence back to Paris.

During his last two voyages, his fifth and sixth (1657–1662, 1664–1668), he did not proceed beyond India. The details of these voyages are often obscure; they nevertheless added to an extraordinary knowledge of overland Eastern trade routes and brought the now famous merchant into close and friendly communication with the greatest Oriental potentates.

These last voyages also secured for him a large fortune and great reputation at home. He was presented to Louis XIV, in whose service he had travelled sixty thousand leagues by land. In 1662, Tavernier married Madeleine Goisse, daughter of a Parisian jeweller. He received patents of nobility on 16 February 1669; in the following year purchased, for 60,000 livres, the Seigneury of Aubonne, located in the Duchy of Savoy, near Geneva.

== Writings ==
Thus settled in ease and affluence, Tavernier occupied himself, it would seem at the desire of the king, in publishing an account of his journeys. He had neither the equipment nor the tastes of a scientific traveller, but in all that referred to commerce his knowledge was vast and could not fail to be of much public service. He set to work therefore with the aid of Samuel Chappuzeau, a French Protestant littérateur, and produced Nouvelle Relation de l'Intérieur du Sérail du Grand Seigneur (4to, Paris, 1675), based on the two visits to Constantinople on his first and sixth journeys.

That book was followed by Les Six Voyages de J. B. Tavernier (2 vols., 4to, Paris, 1676) and by a supplementary Recueil de Plusieurs Relations (4to, Paris, 1679), in which he was assisted by a certain La Chapelle. This last contains an account of Japan, gathered from merchants and others, and one of Tonkin, derived from the observations of his brother Daniel, who had shared his second voyage and settled at Batavia; and it also contains a violent attack on the agents of the Dutch East India Company, at whose hands Tavernier had suffered more than one wrong. This attack was elaborately answered in Dutch by H. van Quellenburgh (Vindictie Batavicae, Amsterdam, 1684), but made more noise because Antoine Arnauld drew from it some material unfavorable to Protestantism for his Apologie pour les Catholiques (1681), and so brought Tavernier a ferocious onslaught in Pierre Jurieu's Esprit de M. Arnauld (1684). Tavernier made no reply to Jurieu.

This work is much prized by historians and geographers for its detailed accounts of the places visited by Tavernier, from 1631 to 1668, and his dealings with politically important persons at a time when reliable reports from the Near East and the Orient were scanty or lacking altogether. Doubt has been cast on Tavernier's accuracy, but ...insofar as gemological information is concerned, Tavernier's observations have also withstood the test of time and are considered reliable.

== Later years and death ==
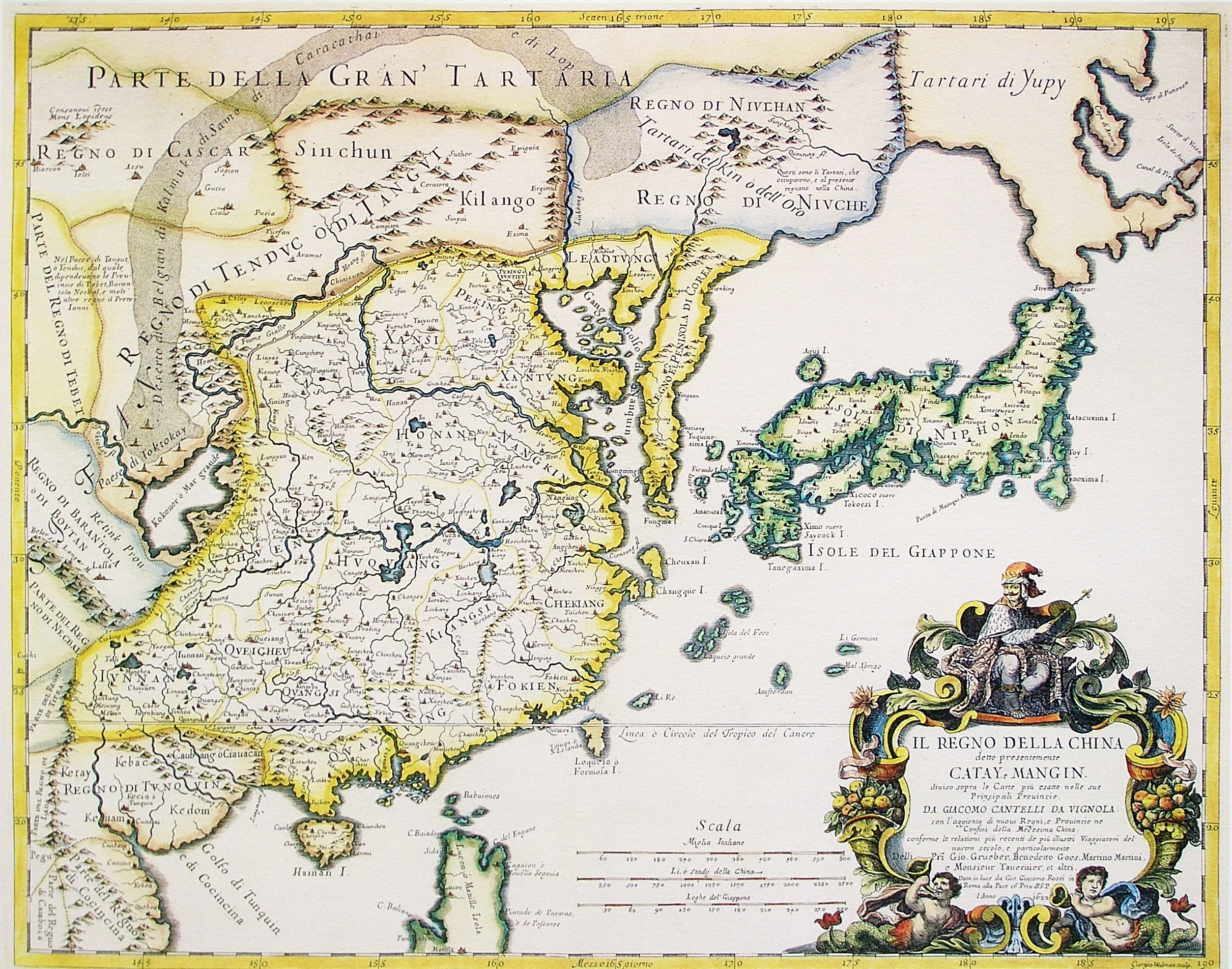
An Italian map (1682) gives credit to Tavernier's accounts among its sources

The closing years of Tavernier's life are not well documented; the times were not favorable for a Protestant in France. In 1684, Tavernier traveled to Brandenburg at the request of Frederick William I, Elector of Brandenburg, to discuss the elector's scheme to charter his own East India Company. The elector wished Tavernier to become his ambassador to India. He awarded Tavernier the honorary posts of Chamberlain and Counselor of Marine. The scheme, unfortunately, came to nothing.

In 1679, Louis XIV began to seriously undermine his Protestant subjects. He established the Bureau of Conversion to reward Catholic converts. In January 1685, Tavernier managed to sell his Château Aubonne to Marquis Henri du Quesne for 138,000 livres plus 3,000 livres for horses and carriages. Tavernier's timing was good: in October of the same year, Louis XIV revoked the Edict of Nantes. Louis then instituted the Verification of Nobility which deprived those Protestant noblemen who refused to convert to Catholicism of their titles. Tavernier was technically a subject of the Duke of Savoy, but Louis threatened to invade the duchy, if the duke, his son-in-law, did not follow his lead.

In 1687, despite an edict prohibiting Protestants from leaving France, Tavernier left Paris and traveled to Switzerland. In 1689, he passed through Berlin and Copenhagen and entered Russia on a passport issued by the king of Sweden, and a visa signed by the Czar's First Minister, Prince Andrea Gallatin, perhaps with the intent of traveling overland to India. It is not known if he met with Czar Peter who was just 17 years old at that time. What is known is that Tavernier, as with all foreigners resident in Moscow, would have been required, by imperial decree, to take up residence in the foreign quarter, known as the German Suburb (Nemetskaya Sloboda). Peter was very interested in all things foreign, had many friends in the suburb, and spent a great deal of time there, beginning in mid-March 1689. Tavernier arrived in Moscow in late February or early March of that year. Tavernier was a famous man. Given Peter's obsession with all things European, it would be surprising if they did not meet.

Tavernier died in Moscow in 1689, at the age of eighty-four. Tavernier was the model of the inveterate traveler, as well as the most consequential diamond dealer of his age. His remarkable three-hundred-year-old book (Le Six Voyages...1677) tells the stories of many significant gems that remain in the public mind today.

Tavernier's biographer Charles Joret, produced a fragment of an article published in a Danish journal by Frederick Rostgaard, who states that he interviewed the aging adventurer and was told of his intention to travel to Persia via Moscow. Tavernier was not, however, able to complete this last journey.

== Legacy ==
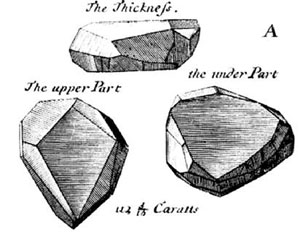
Tavernier's original sketch of the Tavernier Blue diamond

Tavernier's travels, though often reprinted and translated, have a defect for his biographer: the chronology is much confused by his plan of combining notes from various journeys about certain routes, for he sought mainly to furnish a guide to other merchants. A careful attempt to disentangle the thread of a life still in many parts obscure was made by Charles Joret, in Jean-Baptiste Tavernier d'aprés des Documents Nouveaux, 8vo, Paris, 1886, where the literature of the subject is fully given. See also the second English translation of Tavernier's account of his travels, so far as relating to India, by Valentine Ball, 2 vols. (1889). Subsequently, a definitive 2nd edition of Ball's translation, edited by William Crooke was published in 1925. Some consider Tavernier's accounts unreliable.

Tavernier was the subject of an English film, The Diamond Queen (1953) by John Brahm.

The In Search of... episode "The Diamond Curse" repeats a persistent myth that Tavernier was torn apart by wild dogs because of the curse of a blue diamond (subsequently called the Hope Diamond) he had allegedly acquired through deception and murder.

For the 400th anniversary of Tavernier's birth in 2005, the Swiss filmmaker Philippe Nicolet made a full-length film about him called Les voyages en Orient du Baron d'Aubonne. Another Swiss, the sculptor Jacques Basler, made a life-sized bronze effigy of the great 17th-century traveller which looks out over Lake Geneva at the Hotel Baron Tavernier, where there is also a permanent exhibition of all his drawings and archives in Chexbres.

Using Tavernier's Les Six Voyages as a template, gemologist/historian Richard W. Wise wrote an award-winning historical novel, The French Blue, that dramatizes Tavernier's life and voyages up until the sale of The Great Blue Diamond to Louis XIV. The book's website includes a detailed timeline of Tavernier's life and voyages. (In 1671, Louis had his court jeweler Jean Pitau recut the stone into the 68 carat French Blue and had it set as a hatpin. The gem was reset by his great-grandson Louis XV in The Medal of The Order of the Golden Fleece, stolen in 1792, recut, and re-emerged in London 30 years later as the Hope Diamond.)

== Works ==
- Nouvelle Relation De l’intéreur Du Sérail Du Grand Seigneur Contenant Plusieurs Singularitex Qui Jusqu’icy N’ont Point esté mises En Lumiere. Chez Gervais Clouzier, 1st ed. Paris, 7 February 1675.
- Les Six Voyages de Jean Baptiste Tavernier, Ecuyer, Baron d’Aubonne, en Turquie, en Perse, et aux Indes. Chez Olivier de Varennes, 1st ed. Paris 1675.
- A New Relation Of The Inner-Part of The Grand Seignor’s Seraglio, Containing Several Remarkable Particulars, Never Before Expos’d To Public View bound with (p.99) A Short Description of all the Kingdoms Which Encompas the Euxine and Caspian Seas, Delivered by the author after Twenty Years Travel Together with a Preface Containing Several Remarkable Observations concerning divers of the forementioned countries. 1st English Edition, R. L. and Moses Pitt, 1677.
- The Six Voyages of John Baptista Tavernier: Baron of Aubonne, by Jean-Baptiste Tavernier, tr. John Phillips. William Godbid, for Robert Littlebury at the King's Arms in Little Britain, and Moses Pitt at the Angel in St Paul's Church-yard., 1677. This early edition is at the United States Geological Survey Library, and was formerly owned by George Frederick Kunz and Victor Child Villiers, 7th Earl of Jersey.
- Tavernier, Jean Baptiste; Ball, Valentine (tr. from the 1676 French Ed.) (1899). Travels in India by Jean Baptiste Tavernier, 2 Vols. MacMillan and Co., London, 1889, (Vol. 1). Macmillan & Co., London.
- Tavernier, Jean-Baptiste, Travels in India, 2nd ed., edited by William Crooke. 2 vols. Oxford University Press, 1925. Online copy: Vol. II

== See also ==
- Florentine Diamond
- Hope Diamond
- Tavernier's law
