= Roy Eliason =

Australian rules footballer (1926–2019)

Personal information
- Full name: Roy Eliason
- Born: 18 February 1926
- Died: 11 September 2019 (aged 93)
- Original team: Shepparton
- Height: 178 cm (5 ft 10 in)
- Weight: 77 kg (170 lb)

Playing career^{1}
Years	Club	Games (Goals)
1948–49	North Melbourne	5 (0)
- ^{1} Playing statistics correct to the end of 1949.

Roy Eliason (18 February 1926 – 11 September 2019) was an Australian rules footballer who played with North Melbourne in the Victorian Football League (VFL).
