= Hope Diamond =

Historic 45.52-carat diamond of deep-blue color

Coordinates: 38.89094°N 77.02573°W

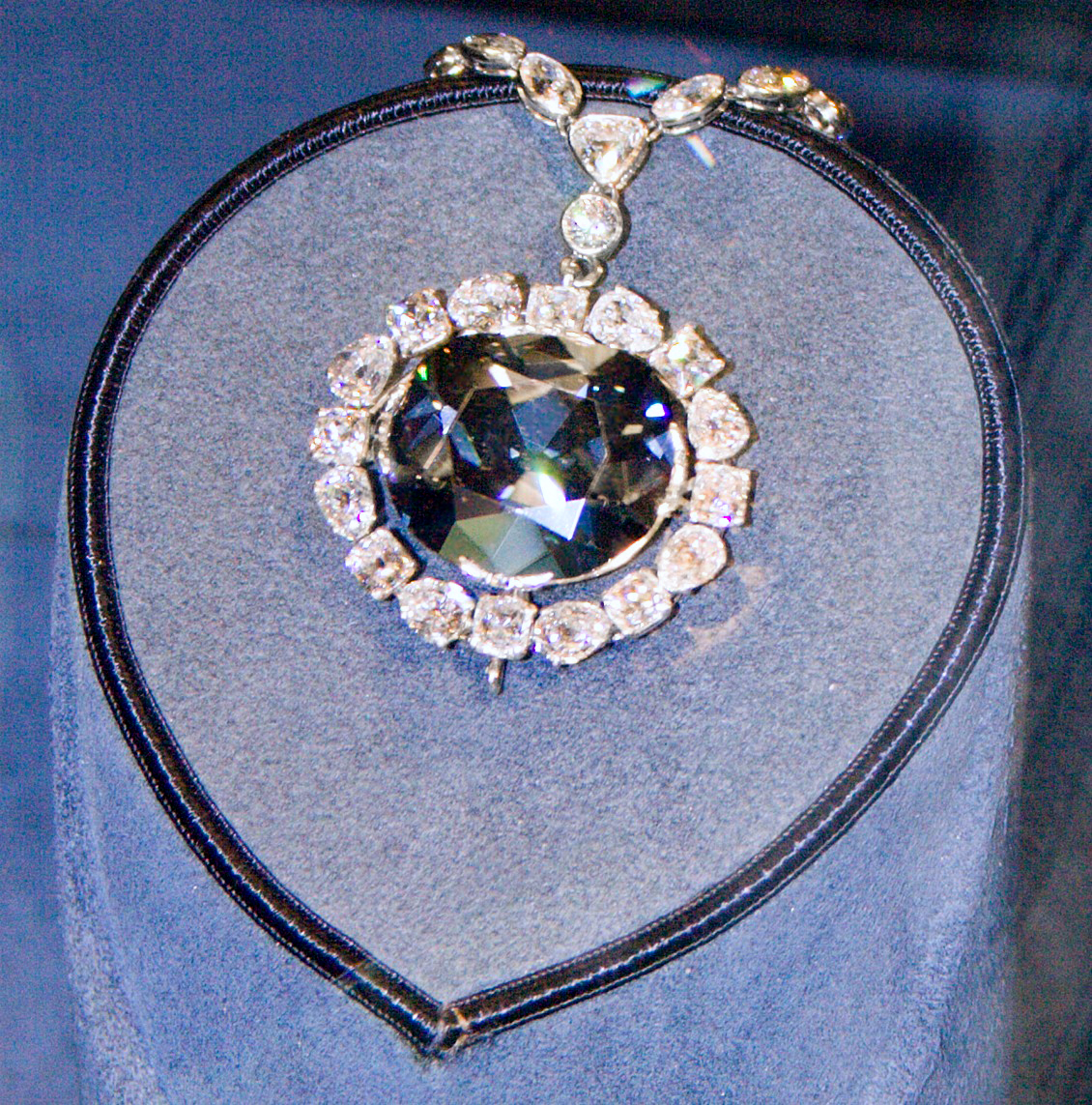
- The Hope Diamond on display at the National Museum of Natural History in Washington, D.C.
- Weight: 45.52 carats (9.104 g; 0.3211 oz)
- Color: Fancy Dark Greyish Blue (GTA)
- Cut: Antique cushion
- Country of origin: India
- Mine of origin: Kollur Mine
- Discovered: Jean-Baptiste Tavernier
- Cut by: Wilhelm Fals
- Original owner: Jean-Baptiste Tavernier
- Owner: Smithsonian Institution
- Estimated value: US$200–350 million

The Hope Diamond is a 45.52-carat (9.104 g; 0.3211 oz) blue diamond that has been famed for its great size and blue-violet color since the 17th century. It was extracted in the 17th century from the Kollur Mine in Andhra Pradesh, India. The gemstone's exceptional size has revealed new information about the formation of diamonds.

The Hope Diamond's recorded history begins in 1666, when the French gem merchant Jean-Baptiste Tavernier purchased the raw Golconda stone in India. After cutting the gem and renaming it "the French Blue" (French: le Bleu de France), Tavernier sold it to King Louis XIV of France in 1668. It was stolen in 1792, re-cut by persons unknown, and recovered after a lapse of years, appearing under the Hope name in an 1839 gem catalogue from the Hope banking family.

The Hope Diamond's last private owner was the American jeweler Harry Winston, who bought it in 1949 from the estate of the mining heiress and socialite Evalyn Walsh McLean. After exhibiting the diamond on tour for several years, Winston set it in a necklace and donated it in 1958 to the Smithsonian Institution's National Museum of Natural History in Washington, D.C., where it remains on permanent exhibition.

== Classification ==
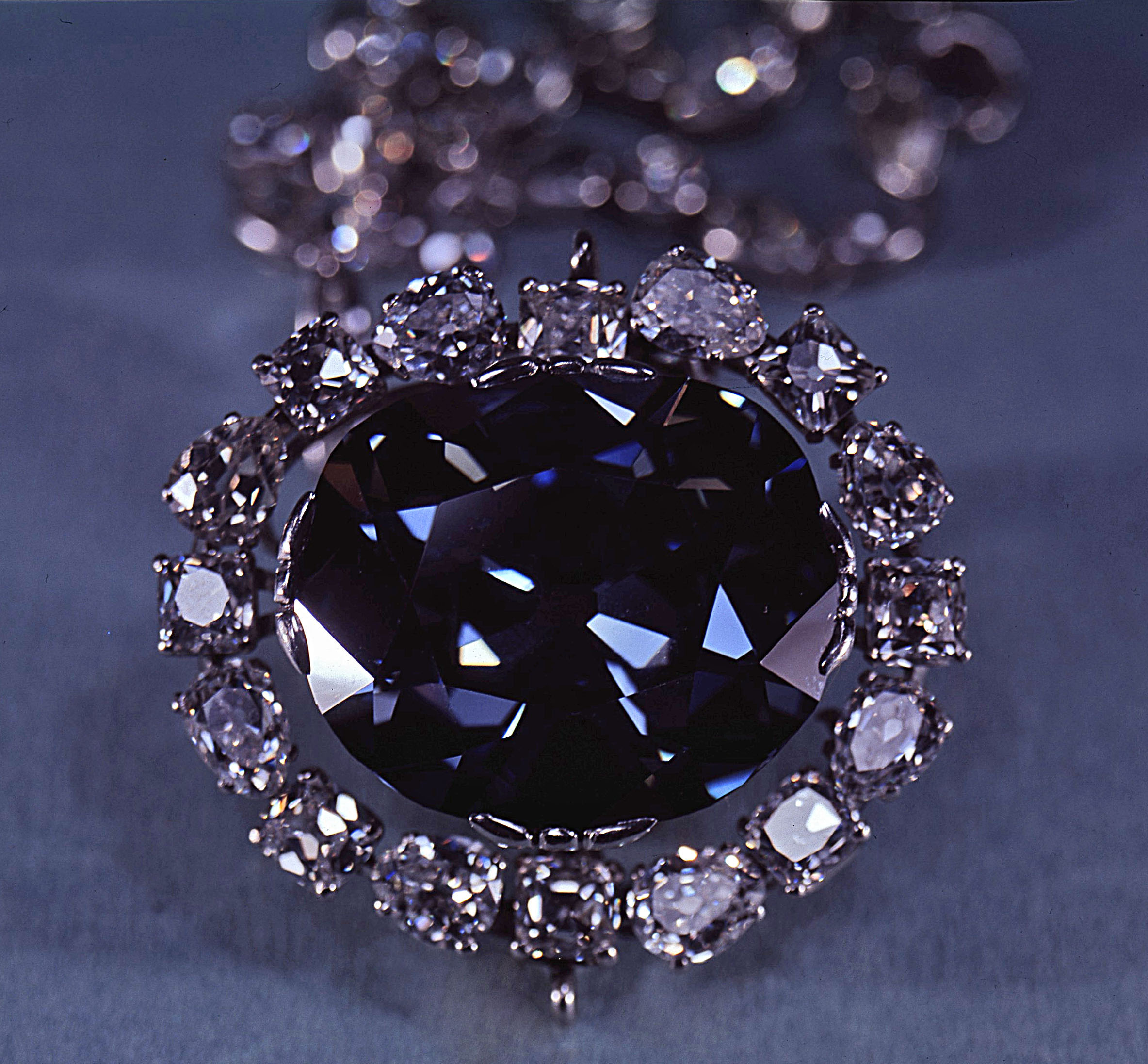
The Hope Diamond in 1974

The Hope Diamond is a large, 45.52-carat (9.104 g; 0.3211 oz), (Note: The diamond's weight was formerly thought to be 44 3/8 carats (8.88 g), but in 1974 it was re-weighed at 45.52 carats (9.10 g).) deep-blue diamond, studded in a pendant called the Order of the Golden Fleece (French: Toison d'or). It is a dark greyish-blue color under ordinary light due to trace amounts of boron within its crystal structure, and it exhibits a red phosphorescence under exposure to ultraviolet light. It is classified as a type IIb diamond.

The Hope Diamond is currently housed in the National Gem and Mineral collection at the National Museum of Natural History in Washington, D.C. It has changed hands numerous times on its way from Hyderabad, India, to France, Great Britain, and the United States, where it is on public display. It has been described as the "most famous diamond in the world".

== Physical properties ==
- Weight: In 1974, the diamond was determined to weigh 45.52 carats (9.104 g; 0.3211 oz).
- Size and shape: The diamond has been compared in size and shape to a pigeon egg or a walnut that is pear-shaped. The length, width, and depth are 25.60 mm × 21.78 mm × 12.00 mm (1 in × 7/8 in × 15/32 in).

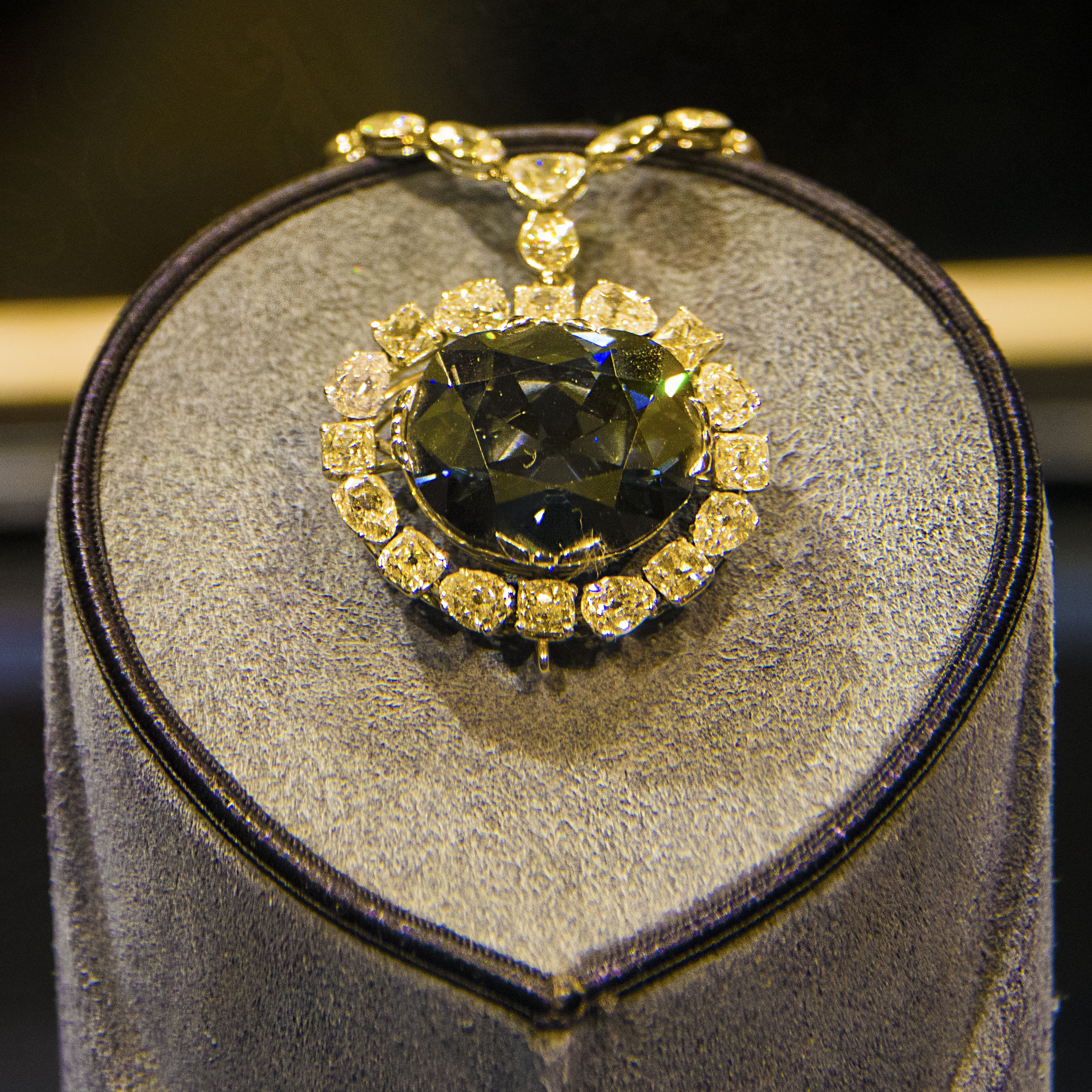
The Hope Diamond in the National Museum of Natural History, Washington D.C., 2014.

- Color: It has been described as "dark blue in color" or having a "steely-blue" color. Blue diamonds similar to the Hope can be shown by colorimetric measurements to be grayer (lower in saturation) than blue sapphires. In 1988, the Gemological Institute of America examined the diamond and, using their proprietary scale, graded it fancy deep grayish blue.
  Visually, the gray modifier (mask) is so dark (indigo) that it produces an "inky" effect, appearing almost blackish-blue in incandescent light. Current photographs of the Hope Diamond use high-intensity light sources that tend to maximize the brilliance of gemstones. In popular literature, many superlatives have been used to describe the Hope Diamond as a "superfine deep blue," often comparing it to the color of a fine sapphire—for example, "blue of the most beautiful blue sapphire" (Deulafait)—and describing its color as "a sapphire blue." Tavernier described it as a "beautiful violet".
- Phosphorescence: The stone exhibits an unusually intense, brilliant red phosphorescence after exposure to short-wave ultraviolet light. This 'glow-in-the-dark' effect persists for some time after the light source has been switched off, and this strange quality may have helped fuel its reputation of being "cursed." The red glow is a phenomenon of blue diamonds that helps scientists "fingerprint" them, allowing them to distinguish real ones from artificial ones. The red glow occurs because of a mixture of boron and nitrogen in the stone.
- Clarity: The clarity was determined to be VS1, with whitish graining present.
- Cut: The cut was described as being "cushion antique brilliant with a faceted girdle and extra facets on the pavilion."
- Chemical composition: In 2010, the diamond was removed from its setting to measure its chemical composition. After boring a hole one nanometer deep, preliminary experiments detected the presence of boron, hydrogen, and possibly nitrogen; the boron concentration varies from zero to eight parts per million. The boron is the cause of the stone's blue color.
- Touch and feel: When the Associated Press reporter Ron Edmonds was allowed by Smithsonian officials to hold the gem in his hands in 2003, he wrote that the first thought that had come into his mind was, "Wow!" It was described as "cool to the touch." He wrote:

You cradle the 45.5-carat stone—about the size of a walnut and heavier than its translucence makes it appear—turning it from side to side as the light flashes from its facets, knowing it's the hardest natural material yet fearful of dropping it.

— Associated Press reporter Ron Edmonds in 2003

- Hardness: Diamonds in general, including the Hope Diamond, are the hardest natural minerals known on Earth, but, because of weak planes in the bonds of a diamond's crystalline structure, the crystal can fracture along these planes if not handled correctly. These weak planes allow diamond cutters to split a rough uncut stone into smaller flawless parts before the process of faceting the stone takes place. Only a diamond can scratch another diamond, so, to be faceted, the uncut rough diamond is mounted in a holder, and then the flat surfaces or facets are ground into the surface of the stone using specially made metal wheels impregnated with diamond particles. These facets are ground and polished with ever finer grades/grits of diamond powder until they have a clear mirror surface, ultimately producing a gem that sparkles by refracting and reflecting light in different ways.

== History ==
=== Geological beginnings ===
The Hope Diamond was formed deep within the Earth approximately 1.1 billion years ago. Like all diamonds, it was formed by carbon atoms strongly bonding together. The Hope Diamond was originally embedded in kimberlite and was later extracted and refined to form the current gem. The Hope Diamond contains trace amounts of boron atoms intermixed with the carbon structure, which results in the rare blue color of the diamond.

People typically think of the Hope Diamond as a historic gem, but... it's [important] as a rare scientific specimen that can provide vital insights into our knowledge of diamonds and how they are formed in the earth.

— Jeffrey Post, Smithsonian curator, 2008

=== India ===
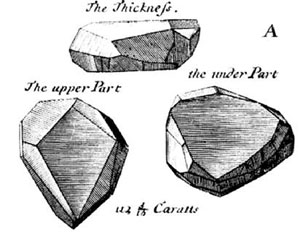
Jean-Baptiste Tavernier's original sketch of the Tavernier Blue

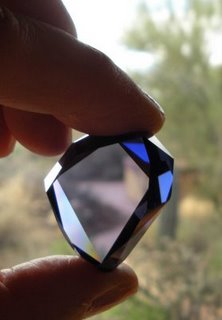
Cubic zirconia replica of the Tavernier Blue

Several accounts, based on remarks written by French gem merchant Jean-Baptiste Tavernier, who obtained the gem in India in 1666, suggest that the gemstone originated in India, in the Kollur mine in the Guntur district of Andhra Pradesh (which, at the time, was part of the Golconda kingdom of the Qutb Shahi dynasty).

Tavernier's book, the Six Voyages (French: Les Six Voyages de J. B. Tavernier), contains sketches of several large diamonds that he sold to King Louis XIV, possibly in 1668 or 1669; a blue diamond is shown among these, and Tavernier mentions the mines at "Gani Coulour" (Kollur Mine) as a source of colored diamonds, but no direct mention of the stone is made. Historian Richard Kurin has built a highly speculative case for 1653 as the year of acquisition, but the most that can be said with certainty is that Tavernier obtained the blue diamond during one of his five voyages to India between the years 1640 and 1667. One report suggests he took 25 diamonds to Paris, including the large rock which became the Hope, and sold all of them to King Louis XIV. Another report suggested that in 1669, Tavernier sold this large blue diamond along with approximately one thousand other diamonds to King Louis XIV for 220,000 livres—the equivalent of 147 kilograms of pure gold.

In the historical novel, The French Blue, gemologist and historian Richard W. Wise proposes that the patent of nobility granted to Tavernier by Louis XIV was part of the payment for the Tavernier Blue. According to the theory, Jean-Baptiste Colbert (the King's Finance Minister at the time) regularly sold noble offices and titles for cash; an outright patent of nobility, according to Wise, was worth approximately 500,000 livres. That amount, plus the reported sale to the King, would have totaled about 720,000 livres, half the price of Tavernier's initial estimate for the gem. There has been controversy regarding the actual weight of the stone: Morel believed that the 112.1875-carat (22.43750 g; 0.791460 oz) stated in Tavernier's invoice would be in old French carats, thus 115.28 metric carats.

=== France ===
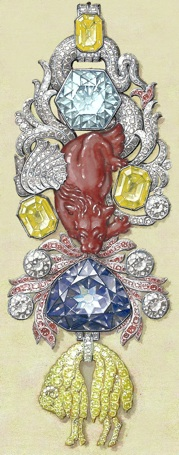
Gouache of the great Golden Fleece of King Louis XV, version 1 of 2008, painted by Pascal Monney (c. 16 × 6 cm).

In 1678, Louis XIV commissioned the court jeweler Jean Pitau to recut the Tavernier Blue, resulting in a 67.125-carat (13.4250 g; 0.47355 oz) stone which royal inventories thereafter listed as the Blue Diamond of the Crown of France (French: diamant bleu de la Couronne de France). Later English-speaking historians have simply called it the French Blue. The king had the stone set on a cravat-pin.

According to one report, Louis ordered Pitau to "make him a piece to remember", and Pitau worked for two years, resulting in a "triangular-shaped 69-carat (13.8 g; 0.49 oz) gem the size of a pigeon's egg that took the breath away as it snared the light, reflecting it back in bluish-grey rays." It was set in gold and was supported by a ribbon for the neck which was worn by the king during ceremonies.

At the diamond's dazzling heart was a sun with seven facets—the sun being Louis' emblem, and seven being a number rich in meaning in biblical cosmology, indicating divinity and spirituality.

— report by Agence France-Presse, 2008

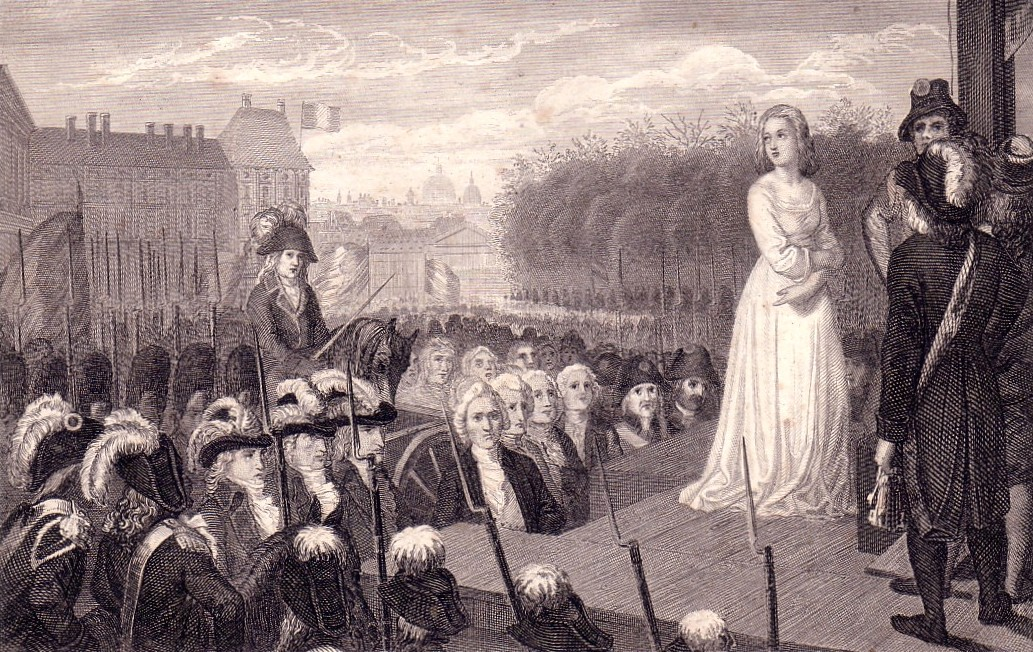
Marie Antoinette before her public execution by guillotine on Place de la Révolution, on October 16, 1793.

In 1749, Louis XIV's great-grandson, Louis XV, had the French Blue set into a more elaborate jeweled pendant for the Order of the Golden Fleece by court jeweler André Jacquemin. The assembled piece included a red spinel of 107-carat (21.4 g; 0.75 oz) carats shaped as a dragon breathing "covetous flames," as well as 83 red-painted diamonds and 112 yellow-painted diamonds to suggest a fleece shape.

The piece fell into disuse after the death of Louis XV. The diamond became the property of his grandson Louis XVI. whose wife, queen Marie Antoinette, used many of the French Crown Jewels for personal adornment by having the individual gems placed in new settings and combinations, but the French Blue remained in this pendant (except for a brief time in 1787, when the stone was removed for scientific study by Mathurin Jacques Brisson).

=== Theft, disappearance and concealment ===
On September 11, 1792, while Louis XVI and his family were imprisoned in the Square du Temple during the early stages of the French Revolution's Reign of Terror, a group of thieves broke into the Royal Storehouse—the Hôtel du Garde-Meuble de la Couronne (now Hôtel de la Marine)—stealing most of the Crown Jewels in a five-day looting spree. While many jewels were later recovered, including other pieces of the Order of the Golden Fleece, the French Blue was not among them, and it disappeared from history.

On January 21, 1793, Louis XVI was guillotined; Marie Antoinette was guillotined on October 16 of the same year. These beheadings are commonly cited as a result of the diamond's "curse," but the historical record suggests that Marie Antoinette had never worn the Golden Fleece pendant because it had been reserved for the exclusive use of the King.

A likely scenario is that the French Blue, sometimes also known as the Blue Diamond, was "swiftly smuggled to London" after being seized in 1792 in Paris. But the rock known as the French Blue was never seen again in its recorded form, since it almost certainly was recut during this decades-long period of anonymity, with the largest remaining piece becoming the Hope Diamond. One report suggested that the cut was a "butchered job" because it sheared off 23.5-carat (4.70 g; 0.166 oz) from the larger rock as well as hurting its "extraordinary luster."

It was long believed that the Hope Diamond had been cut from the French Blue, and confirmation came when a three-dimensional leaden model of the latter was rediscovered in the archives of the Paris National Museum of Natural History in 2005. Previously, the dimensions of the French Blue had been known only from two drawings made in 1749 and 1789; although the model differs slightly from the drawings in some details, these details are identical to features of the Hope Diamond, allowing CAD technology to digitally reconstruct the French Blue around the recut stone.

The leaden model revealed 20 unknown facets on the back of the French Blue. It also confirmed that the diamond had undergone a rather rough recut that removed the three points and reduced the thickness by a few millimeters. The Sun King's blue diamond became unrecognizable and the baroque style of the original cut was definitely lost.

Historians suggested that one burglar, Cadet Guillot, took several jewels, including the French Blue and the Côte-de-Bretagne spinel, to Le Havre and then to London, where the French Blue was cut into two pieces.

Morel adds that in 1796, Guillot attempted to resell the Côte-de-Bretagne in France but was forced to relinquish it to fellow thief Lancry de la Loyelle, who put Guillot into debtors' prison.

In a contrasting report, the historian Richard Kurin speculated that the "theft" of the French Crown Jewels was in fact engineered by the revolutionary leader Georges Danton as part of a plan to bribe an opposing military commander, Duke Karl Wilhelm of Brunswick. When under attack by Napoleon in 1805, Karl Wilhelm may have had the French Blue recut to disguise its identity; in this form, the stone could have come to Great Britain in 1806, when his family fled there to join his daughter Caroline of Brunswick. Although Caroline was the wife of the Prince Regent (later King George IV), she lived apart from her husband, and financial straits sometimes forced her to quietly sell her own jewels to support her household. Caroline's nephew, Duke Karl Friedrich, was later known to possess a 13.75-carat (2.750 g; 0.0970 oz) blue diamond which was widely thought to be another piece of the French Blue.

This smaller diamond's present whereabouts are unknown. A 2010 three-dimensional reconstruction of the French Blue from an authenticated leaden cast of the jewel fits too tightly around the Hope Diamond to allow for the existence of a sister stone of that size and concluded that there could be no significant offcuts from refashioning the French Blue into the Hope Diamond.

=== United Kingdom ===
A blue diamond with the same shape, size, and color as the Hope Diamond was recorded by John Francillon as in the possession of the London diamond merchant Daniel Eliason in September 1812, the earliest point when the history of the Hope Diamond can be definitively fixed. This date was just two days after 20 years anniversary of the French Blue theft, just as the statute of limitations for the crime had taken effect. However, a second, less definitive report claims that the Hope Diamond's "authentic history" can only be traced back to 1830. The jewel was a "massive blue stone of 45.54-carat (9.108 g; 0.3213 oz)" and weighed 177 gr (11.5 g) (4 gr (0.26 g) = 1 carat).

While the diamond had disappeared for two decades, there were questions whether this diamond now in Great Britain was exactly the same one as had belonged to the French kings. Scientific investigation in 2008 confirmed "beyond reasonable doubt" that the Hope Diamond and that owned by the kings of France were, indeed, the same gemstone.

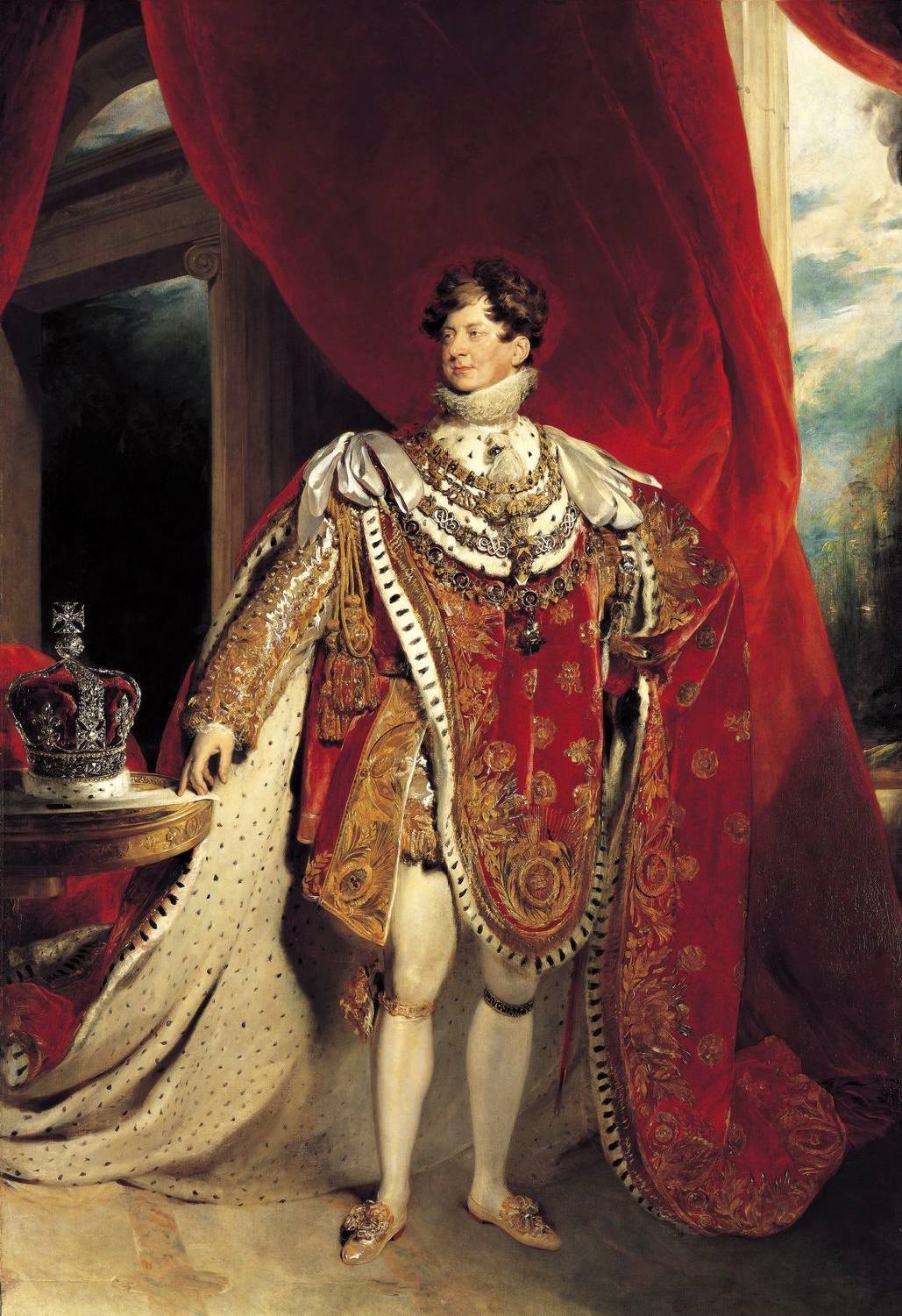
Coronation portrait of George IV

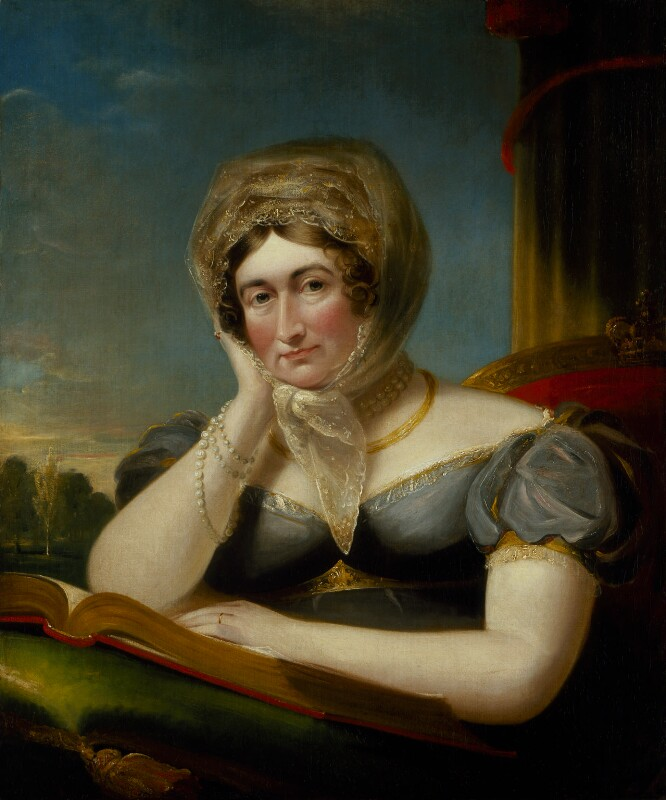
There is speculation that George's wife, Caroline of Brunswick, may have helped procure the diamond for the British monarch, but records are lacking.

There are conflicting reports about what happened to the diamond during these years. Eliason's diamond may have been acquired by George IV, possibly through Caroline of Brunswick; however, there is no record of the ownership in the Royal Archives at Windsor, although some secondary evidence exists in the form of contemporary writings and artwork, and George IV tended to mix up the Crown property of the Crown jewels with family heirlooms and his own personal property.

A source at the Smithsonian suggested there were "several references" suggesting that George had indeed owned the diamond. After his death in 1830, it has been alleged that some of this mixed collection was stolen by George's last mistress, Elizabeth Conyngham, and some of his personal effects were discreetly liquidated to cover the many debts he had left behind him. Another report states that the king's debts were "so enormous" that the diamond was probably sold through "private channels". In either case, the blue diamond was not retained by the British royal family.

The stone was later reported to have been acquired by a rich London banker named Thomas Hope, for either US$65,000 or $90,000. It has been suggested that Eliason may have been a "front" for Hope, acting not as a diamond merchant venturing money on his own account, but rather as an agent to acquire the diamond for the banker. In 1839, the Hope Diamond appeared in a published catalog of the gem collection of his brother Henry Philip Hope, members of the Anglo-Dutch banking family Hope & Co.

The stone was set in a fairly simple medallion surrounded by many smaller white diamonds, which he sometimes lent to Louisa de la Poer Beresford, the widow of his brother, Thomas Hope, for society balls. After falling into the ownership of the Hope family, the stone came to be known as the "Hope Diamond".

Henry Philip Hope died in 1839, the same year as the publication of his collection catalog. His three nephews, the sons of Thomas and Louisa, fought in court for ten years over his inheritance, and ultimately the collection was split up. The oldest nephew, Henry Thomas Hope, received eight of the most valuable gems, including the Hope Diamond. It was displayed in the Great Exhibition of London in 1851 and at the 1855 Exposition Universelle in Paris, but was usually kept in a bank vault. In 1861, Henry Thomas Hope's only child, Henrietta, married Henry Pelham-Clinton (and later Duke of Newcastle).

When Hope died on December 4, 1862, his wife Anne Adele inherited the gem, but she feared that the profligate lifestyle of her son-in-law might cause him to sell the Hope properties. Upon Adele's death in 1884, the entire Hope estate, including the Hope Diamond, was entrusted to Henrietta's younger son, Henry Francis Pelham-Clinton, on the condition that he add the name of "Hope" to his own surnames when he reached the age of legal majority.

As Lord Francis Hope, this grandson received his legacy in 1887. However, he had only a life interest in his inheritance, meaning that he could not sell any part of it without court permission.

In 1894, Lord Francis Hope met the American concert hall singer May Yohé, who has been described as "the sensation of two continents", and they were married the same year; one account suggests that Yohé wore the Hope Diamond on at least one occasion.

She later claimed that she had worn it at social gatherings and had an exact replica made for her performances, but her husband claimed otherwise. Lord Francis lived beyond his means, and this eventually caught up with him, leading to marriage troubles and financial reverses, and he found that he had to sell the diamond.

In 1896, his bankruptcy was discharged, but, as he could not sell the Hope Diamond without the court's permission, he was supported financially by his wife during these intervening years. In 1901, the financial situation had changed, and after a "long legal fight," he was given permission to sell the Hope Diamond by an order of the Master in Chancery to "pay off debts". But May Yohé ran off with a gentleman friend named Putnam Strong, who was a son of the former New York City mayor William L. Strong. Francis Hope and May Yohé were divorced in 1902.

Francis sold the diamond for £29,000 (£3.08 million today), to Adolph Weil, a London jewel merchant. Weil sold the stone in 1901 to the diamond dealer Simon Frankel, based in New York and/or London who took it to New York. One report stated that he had paid $250,000 ($9.7 million today). However, in New York it was evaluated to be worth $141,032 ($5.46 million today).

=== United States (1902–present) ===
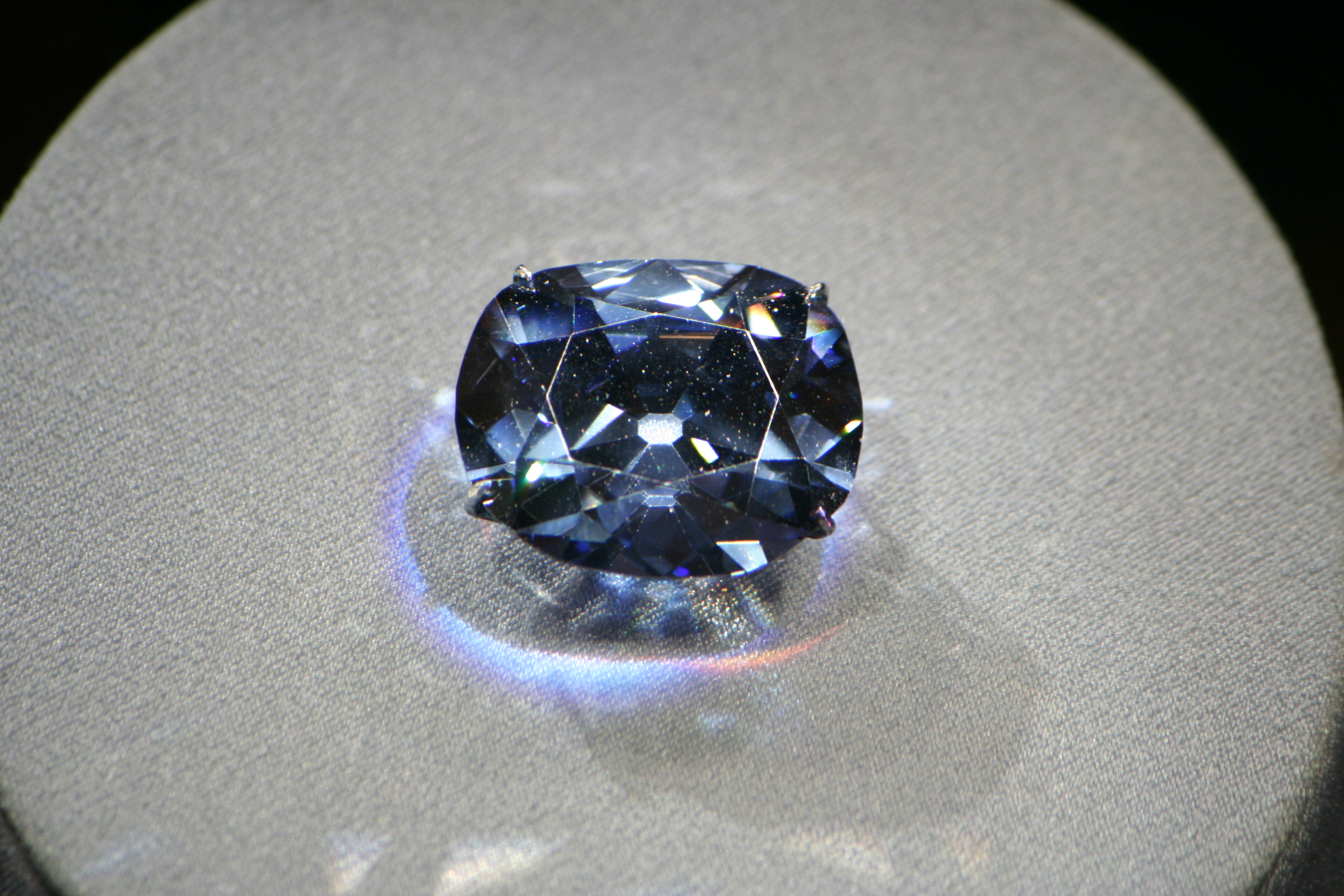
The Hope Diamond with case lights turned on

Accounts vary about what happened to the diamond during the years 1902–1907; one account suggested that it lay in the William & Theodore safe during these years while the jewelers took it out periodically to show it to wealthy Americans; a rival account, probably invented to help add "mystery" to the Hope Diamond story, suggested that some persons had bought it but apparently sold it back to Frankel. There were reports in one story in The New York Times of several owners of the gem, perhaps who had bought it from Frankel and owned it temporarily who met with ill-fortune, but this report conflicts with the more likely possibility that the gem remained in the hands of the Frankel jewelry firm during these years. Like many jewelry firms, the Frankel business ran into financial difficulties during the depression of 1907 and referred to the gem as the "hoodoo diamond."

In 1908, Frankel sold the diamond for $400,000 ($14.33 million today) to a Salomon or Selim Habib, a wealthy Turkish diamond collector, reportedly on behalf of Sultan Abdulhamid of the Ottoman Empire; however, on June 24, 1909, the stone was included in an auction of Habib's assets to settle his own debts, and the auction catalog explicitly stated that the Hope Diamond was one of only two gems in the collection which had never been owned by the Sultan. A contrary report, however, suggested that Sultan Abdul Hamid did own the gem but ordered Habib to sell it when his throne "began to totter." Habib reportedly sold the stone in Paris in 1909 for $80,000 ($2.87 million today). The Parisian jewel merchant Simon Rosenau bought the Hope Diamond for 400,000 francs and resold it in 1910 to Pierre Cartier for 550,000 francs. In 1910, it was offered for $150,000 ($5.18 million today), according to one report.

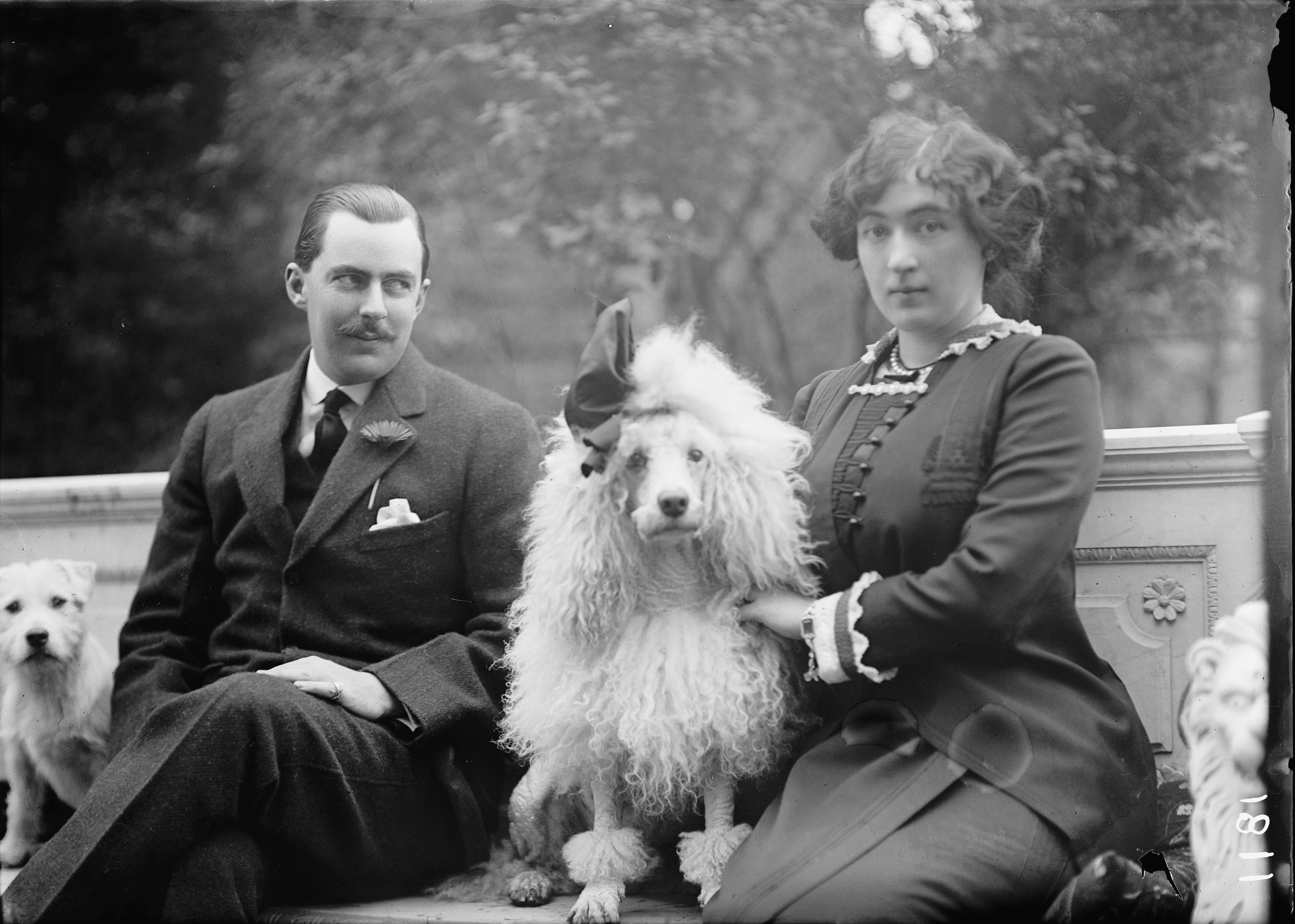
The Washington Post scion Edward Beale McLean and his wife, the mining heiress Evalyn Walsh McLean, in 1912. The couple owned the Hope Diamond for many years.

Pierre Cartier tried to sell the Hope Diamond to Washington, D.C., socialite Evalyn Walsh McLean and her husband in 1910. Cartier was a consummate salesman who used an understated presentation to entice Mrs. McLean. He described the gem's illustrious history to her while keeping it concealed underneath special wrapping paper. The suspense worked: McLean became impatient to the point where she suddenly requested to see the stone. She recalled later that Cartier "held before our eyes the Hope Diamond." Nevertheless, she initially rejected the offer. Cartier had it reset. She found the stone much more appealing in this new modern style. There were conflicting reports about the sale in The New York Times; one account suggested that the young McLean couple had agreed to purchase the diamond, but after having learned about its unfortunate supposed history, the couple had wanted to back out of the deal since they knew nothing of the "history of misfortunes that have beset its various owners."

Both Ned McLean and his pretty wife are quite young, and in a way unsophisticated, although they were born and reared in an atmosphere of wealth and luxury. All their lives they have known more of jewelry, finery, banquets, automobiles, horses, and other articles of pleasure than they have of books, with their wealth of knowledge.

— report in The New York Times, March 1911

The brouhaha over the diamond's supposed "ill luck" prompted a worried editor of The Jewelers' Circular-Weekly to write:

No mention of any ill luck having befallen Eliason, Hope, or any of their descendants was ever made. The Frankels surely were very prosperous while the stone was in their possession, as were the dealers who held it in Europe. Habib's misfortune referred to in the newspaper accounts occurred long after he had sold the stone... As Francis Hope never had the stone and May Yohe probably never saw it ... the newspaper accounts at the time mentioned were laughed at, but since then it has been the custom not only to revive these stories every time mention of the stone appears in the public press, but to add to them fictitious incidents of misfortune as to alleged possessors of the stone at various times.

— T. Edgar Willson, in an editorial in The New York Times, 1911

The tenuous deal involved wrangling among attorneys for both Cartier and the McLeans, but finally, in 1911, the couple bought the gem for over $300,000 (over $10.4 million today), although there are differing estimates of the sales price at $150,000 and $180,000. An alternative scenario is that the McLeans may have fabricated concern about the supposed "curse" to generate publicity to increase the value of their investment.

A description was that the gemstone "lay on a bed of white silk and surrounded by many small white diamonds cut pear shaped". The new setting was the current platinum framework surrounded by a row of sixteen diamonds which alternated between old mine cut and pear-shaped variants. Mrs. McLean wore it to a "brilliant reception" in February 1912 when it was reported that it was the first time it had been worn in public since it had "changed owners." She would "sport the diamond at social events" and wore it to numerous social occasions that she had organized.

The Hope Diamond in its original pendant must have looked fantastic at parties circa the 1920s, when it hung around the neck of owner Evalyn Walsh McLean's Great Dane, Mike.

— report in The Wall Street Journal, 2010

There were reports that she misplaced it at parties, deliberately and frequently, and then make a children's game out of "finding the Hope", and times when she hid the diamond somewhere on her estate during the "lavish parties she threw and invite guests to find it." The stone prompted elaborate security precautions:

William Schindele, a former Secret Service man, has been engaged to guard the stone. He in turn will be guarded by Leo Costello and Simeon Blake, private detectives. The stone will be kept at the McLean mansion during the day and each night will be deposited in a safe deposit vault. When Mrs. McLean wears the gem at balls and receptions arrangements have been made to keep the safe deposit building open until after the function that the stone may be safely stored away. A special automobile has been purchased to convey the guards to and from the house to the trust company's building.

— report in The New York Times, 1911

But the stone was not stolen during their ownership. When Mrs. McLean died in 1947, she bequeathed the diamond to her grandchildren through a will which insisted that her former property would remain in the custody of trustees until the eldest child had reached 25 years of age. This requirement would have prevented any sale for the next two decades. However, the trustees gained permission to sell her jewels to settle her debts, and in 1949 sold them to New York diamond merchant Harry Winston. He purchased McLean's "entire jewelry collection". Over the next decade, Winston exhibited McLean's necklace in his "Court of Jewels," a tour of jewels around the United States, as well as various promotional events and charity balls. The diamond appeared on the television quiz show The Name's the Same, in an episode which first aired on August 16, 1955, when a teenaged contestant with the actual name Hope Diamond was one of the mystery guests, as well as at the August 1958 Canadian National Exhibition. At some point, Winston also had the Hope Diamond's bottom facet slightly recut to increase its brilliance.

=== Smithsonian ownership ===
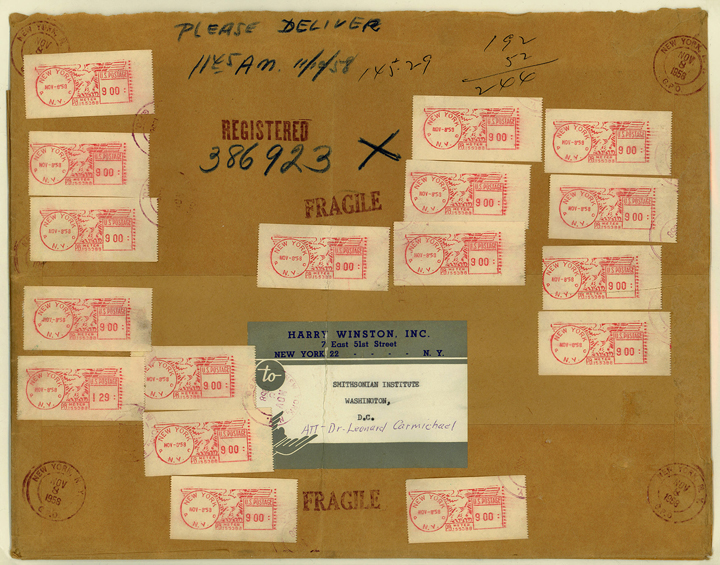
Registered Mail package used to deliver the Hope Diamond to the National Museum of Natural History.

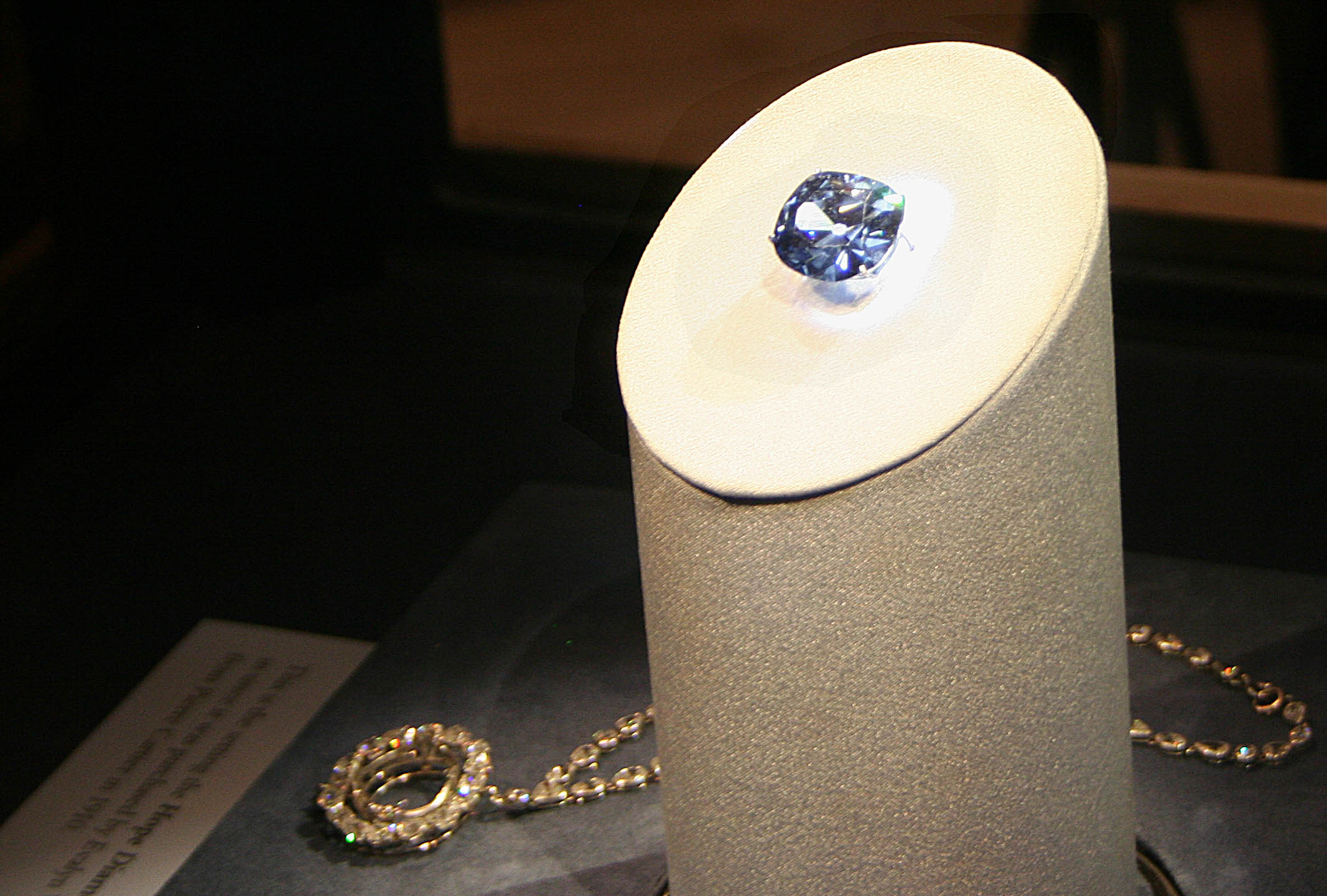
The Hope Diamond in November 2009, prior to being put in its new setting at the National Gem Collection.

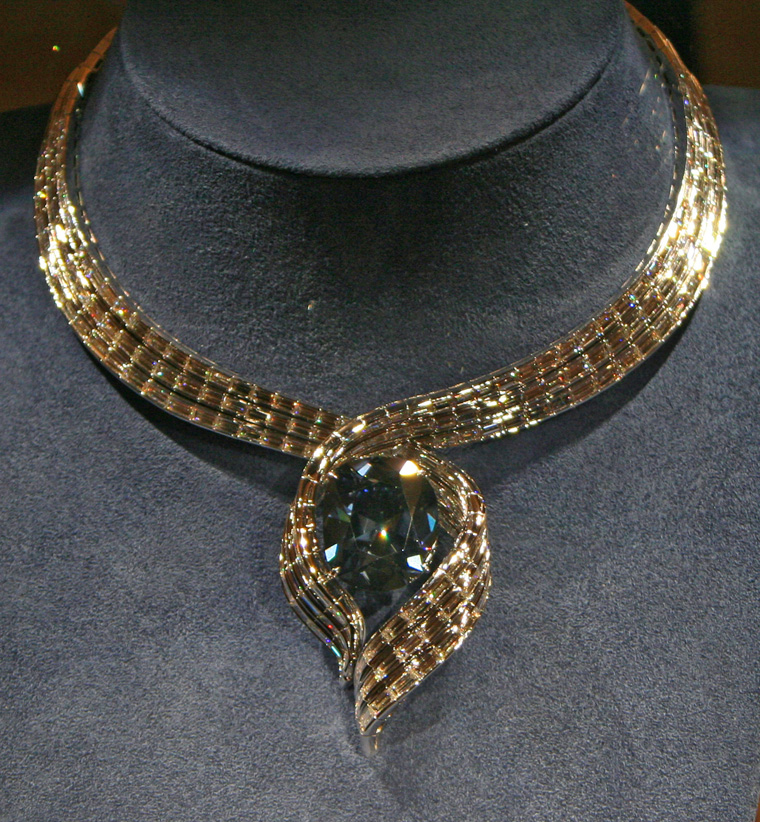
The Hope Diamond in the "Embracing Hope" setting, March 2011

Smithsonian mineralogist George Switzer is credited with persuading jeweler Harry Winston to donate the Hope Diamond for a proposed national gem collection to be housed at the National Museum of Natural History. On November 10, 1958, Winston acquiesced, sending it through U.S. Mail in a box wrapped in brown paper as simple registered mail insured for $1 million at a cost of $145.29, of which $2.44 was for postage and the balance insurance. Upon its arrival it became Specimen #217868.

Winston had never believed in any of the tales about the curse; he donated the diamond with the hope that it would help the United States "establish a gem collection."

Winston died many years later, in 1978, of a heart attack. Winston's gift, according to Smithsonian curator Dr. Jeffrey Post, indeed helped spur additional gifts to the museum.

For its first four decades in the National Museum of Natural History, the Hope Diamond lay in its necklace inside a glass-fronted safe as part of the gems and jewelry gallery, except for a few brief excursions: a 1962 exhibition to the Louvre; the 1965 Rand Easter Show in Johannesburg, South Africa; and two visits back to Harry Winston's premises in New York City, once in 1984, and once for a 50th anniversary celebration in 1996.

To guard against theft during the diamond's trip to the 1962 Louvre exhibition, Switzer traveled to Paris with the Hope Diamond tucked inside a velvet pouch sewn by his wife. The Hope Diamond was placed into the pouch, which was pinned inside Switzer's pants pocket for the flight.

When the Smithsonian's gallery was renovated in 1997, the necklace was moved onto a rotating pedestal inside a cylinder made of 3-inch (76 mm) thick bulletproof glass in its own display room, adjacent to the main exhibit of the National Gem Collection, in the Janet Annenberg Hooker Hall of Geology, Gems, and Minerals. The Hope Diamond is the most popular jewel on display and the collection's centerpiece.

In 1988, specialists with the Gemological Institute of America graded it and noticed "evidence of wear" and its "remarkably strong phosphorescence" with its clarity "slightly affected by a whitish graining which is common to blue diamonds." A highly sensitive colorimeter found tiny traces of a "very slight violet component" which is imperceptible to normal vision.

In 2005, the Smithsonian published a year-long computer-aided geometry research which officially determined that the Hope Diamond is, in fact, cut from the stolen French Blue crown jewel.

In 2009, the Smithsonian announced a temporary new setting for the jewel to celebrate a half-century at the National Museum of Natural History. Starting in September 2009 it was exhibited as a stand-alone gem with no setting. It had been removed from its setting for cleaning from time to time, but this was the first time it would be on public display by itself. Previously it had been shown in a platinum setting, surrounded by 16 white pear-shaped and cushion-cut diamonds, suspended from a chain containing forty-five diamonds.

The Hope returned to its traditional setting in late 2010.

On November 18, 2010, the Hope Diamond was unveiled and displayed at the Smithsonian in a temporary newly designed necklace called "Embracing Hope", created by the Harry Winston firm. Three designs for the new setting, all white diamonds and white metal, were created and the public voted on the final version.

The Hope Diamond also is resting on a new dark blue neck form, which the Harry Winston firm commissioned from display organization, Pac Team Group. Previously, the Hope Diamond had been displayed as a loose gem since late summer of 2009 when it was removed from its former Cartier-designed setting. A Smithsonian curator described it as "priceless" because it was "irreplaceable", although it was reported to be insured for $250 million.

On January 13, 2012, the diamond was returned to its historic setting, and the current necklace was implanted with another diamond worth "at least a million dollars". The necklace with the new diamond will be sold to benefit the Smithsonian.

== Changes over time ==
Changes over time
| Date acquired | Owner | Change in diamond | Value when sold | Notes |
|---|---|---|---|---|
| 1653 | Jean-Baptiste Tavernier | 112.5 Old French karats, 116 metric carats | 220,000–720,000 livres. Tavernier received Patent of Nobility as part payment worth 450,000 livres | |
| 1668 | Louis XIV of France | Triangular 69 metric-carat gem, set on a cravat-pin 1674. | Bequeathed | Morel, p.166 |
| 1715 | Louis XV of France | Assembled into elaborate pendant Order of the Golden Fleece | Bequeathed | |
| 1775 | Louis XVI of France | 69 metric carats | Stolen | |
| 1791 | Government of France | | Stolen | |
| 1792 | Unknown | | Stolen | |
| 1812-1823 | Daniel Eliason, a London jeweler and receiver | About 44 non-metric carats (44-carat (8.8 g; 0.31 oz)) | | |
| 1821 | Henry Phillip Hope (1774–1839) | Became known as the "Hope Diamond" | £30,000 | |
| 1839 | Henry Thomas Hope | | Bequeathed | Displayed at the 1851 London Exhibition |
| 1861 | Anne Adéle Hope, wife of Henry Thomas Hope | | Bequeathed | |
| 1884 | Lord Francis Hope | | Bequeathed | worn by May Yohé, Lady Henry Francis Hope |
| 1901 | Adolph Weil, London jewel merchant | | $141,032 (approximately £28,206). Second est: $148,000 | |
| 1901 | Simon Frankel | | reportedly $250,000 | |
| 1908 | Selim Habib, Turkish diamond merchant. | | $200,000 | |
| 1909 | Simon Rosenau | | 550,000 francs | |
| 1910 | Pierre Cartier | Reset to appeal to Evelyn McLean; diamond mounted as a headpiece on three-tiered circlet of large white diamonds; became pendant | $110,000 as reported to US Customs | |
| 1911 | Edward Beale McLean and Evelyn Walsh McLean | Weight thought to be 44.5 carats (44.5-carat (8.90 g; 0.314 oz)) | $180,000 | Entire McLean collection sold to Winston |
| 1947 | Harry Winston | Diamond's bottom facet slightly recut to increase brilliance | | NYC jeweler |
| 1958 | Smithsonian Institution | Settings, mountings, scientific study; weight found to be 45.52 metric carats in 1974 | $200–$250 million (if sold in 2011) | |

== Curse mythology ==
=== Superstitions, publicity, marketing ===
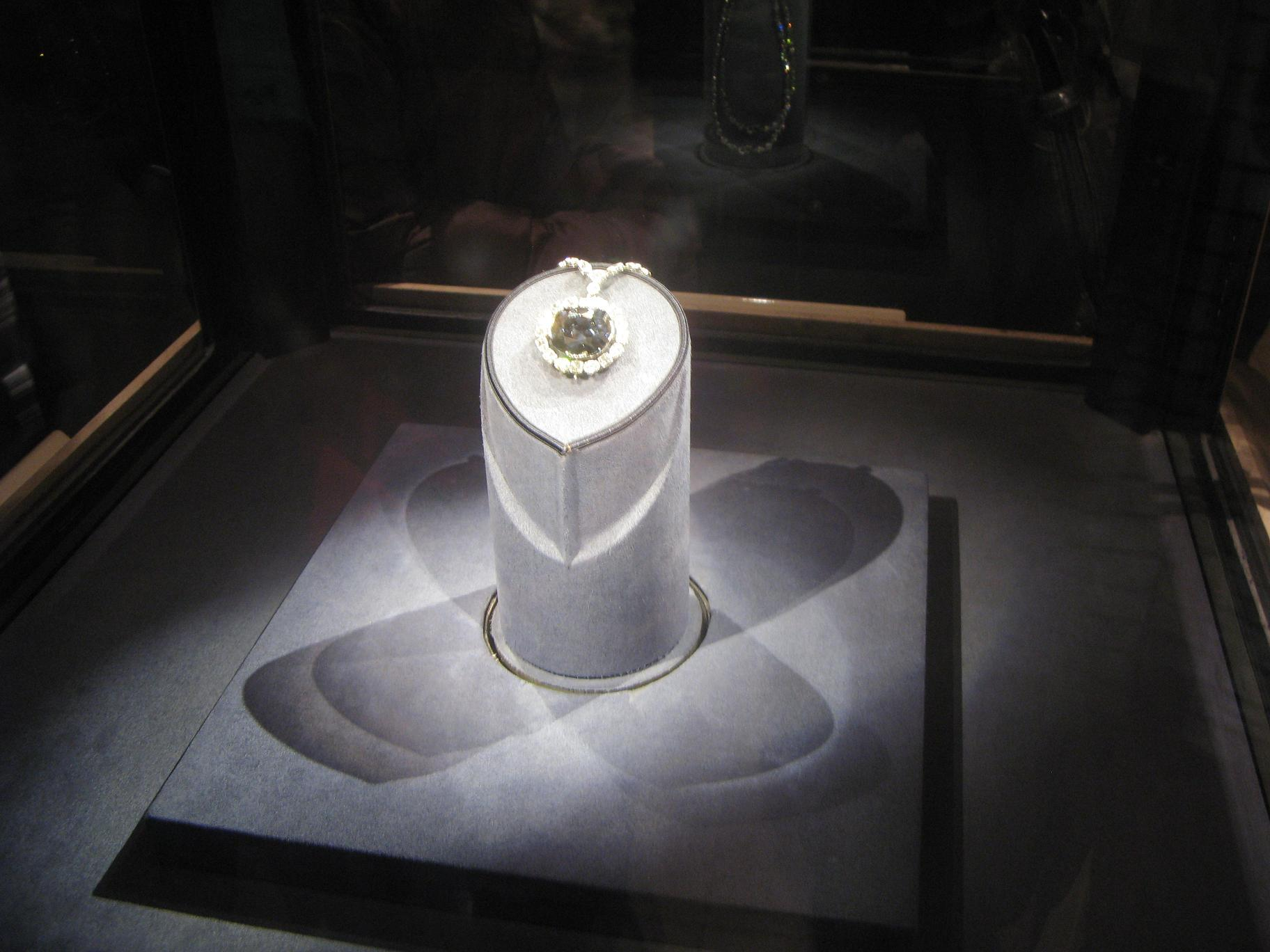
The Hope Diamond in the National Gem Collection in its original setting.

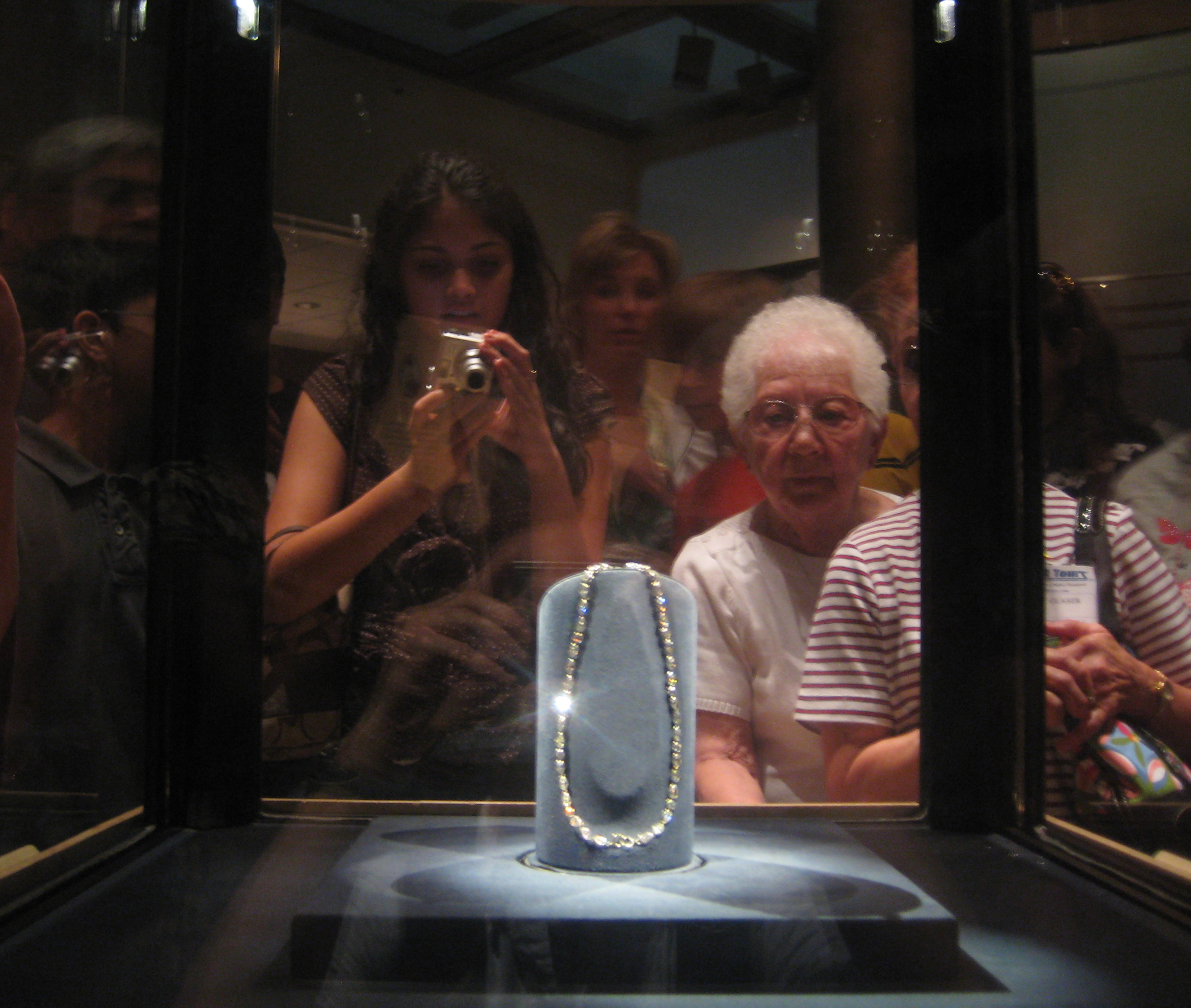
Spectators gazing at the Hope Diamond seen from the rear in its case at the National Gem Collection of the Smithsonian Institution.

The diamond has been surrounded by a mythology of a reputed "curse" to the effect that it brings misfortune and tragedy to anyone who owns it or wears it, but there are strong indications that such fabrications enhance the stone's mystery and appeal, since increased publicity usually raised the gem's value and newsworthiness.

According to many specious accounts in the late nineteenth and early twentieth century, the original form of the Hope Diamond was stolen from an eye of a sculpted statue of the Hindu goddess Sita. However, much like the "curse of Tutankhamun", this general type of "legend" was most likely the independent creation of Western authors during the Victorian era, and the specific legends about the Hope Diamond's "cursed origin" were invented in the early 20th century to add mystique to the stone and increase its sales appeal as well as increase newspaper sales.

It fueled speculation that persons possessing the gemstone were fated to have bad luck with varying reports of undetermined veracity. A report in 2006 in The New York Times, however, suggested that "any hard evidence linking it to tragedy has yet to be officially proven".

There is evidence of several newspaper accounts which helped spread the "curse" story. A New Zealand newspaper article in 1888 described the supposedly lurid history of the Hope Diamond, including a claim that it was "said once to have formed the single eye of a great idol", as part of a confused description that also claimed that its namesake owner had personally "brought it from India", and that the diamond's true color was "white, [although] when held to the light, it emits the most superb and dazzling blue rays".

An article entitled "Hope Diamond Has Brought Trouble To All Who Have Owned It" appeared in The Washington Post in 1908. In 1909 upon reporting on the sale of the Hope Diamond The Times also gave an account of its history, noting "its possession is the story of a long series of tragedies - murder, suicide, madness, and various other misfortunes."

These were followed by another New York Times article in 1911 which gave a list of supposed cases of ill-fortune, but with few confirmations from other sources:

- Jacques Colet bought the Hope Diamond from Simon Frankel and committed suicide.
- Prince Ivan Kanitovski bought it from Colet but was killed by Russian revolutionaries.
- Kanitovski loaned it to Mlle Ladue who was "murdered by her sweetheart".
- Simon Mencharides, who had once sold it to the Turkish sultan, was thrown from a precipice along with his wife and young child.
- Sultan Hamid gave it to Abu Sabir to "polish" but later Sabir was imprisoned and tortured.
- Stone guardian Kulub Bey was hanged by a mob in Turkey.
- A Turkish attendant named Hehver Agha was hanged for having it in his possession.
- Tavernier, who brought the stone from India to Paris was "torn to pieces by wild dogs in Constantinople".
- King Louis XIV gave it to Madame de Montespan whom later he abandoned.
- Nicolas Fouquet, an "Intendant of France", borrowed it temporarily to wear it but was "disgraced and died in prison".
- A temporary wearer, Princess de Lamballe, was "torn to pieces by a French mob".
- Jeweler William Fals who recut the stone "died a ruined man".
- William Fals' son Hendrik stole the jewel from his father and later died by suicide.
- Some years (after Hendrik) "it was sold to Francis Deaulieu, who died in misery and want".

The mainstream view is that these accounts are specious and speculative since there are few, if any, independent confirmations to back them up. A few months later, perhaps compounded by inaccurate reports in The New York Times on November 17, 1909, it was incorrectly reported that the diamond's former owner, Selim Habib, had drowned in a shipwreck of the steamer Seyne near Singapore; in fact, it was a different person with the same name, not the owner of the diamond. There was speculation that jeweler Pierre Cartier further embroidered the lurid tales to intrigue Evalyn Walsh McLean into buying the Hope Diamond in 1911.

The theme of greedy robbers stealing a valuable object from the tomb or shrine of an ancient god or ruler, and then being punished by it, is one which repeats in many different forms of literature. A likely source of inspiration for the fabrications was the Wilkie Collins' 1868 novel, The Moonstone, which created a coherent narrative from vague and largely disregarded legends which had been attached to other diamonds such as the Koh-i-Noor and the Orloff diamond. The theme can be seen in stories about the curse of Egyptian king Tutankhamun and in films such as those of the Indiana Jones and The Mummy franchises. In keeping with these scripts, according to the legend, Tavernier did not buy the Hope diamond but stole it from a Hindu temple where it had been set as one of two matching eyes of an idol, and the temple priests then laid a curse on whoever might possess the missing stone. Largely because the other blue diamond "eye" never surfaced, historians dismissed the fantastical story.

The stories generally do not bear up to more pointed examination; for example, the legend that Tavernier's body was "torn apart by wolves" is inconsistent with historical evidence which shows that he lived to 84 and died of natural causes.

It is possible that the overblown story of the "curse", possibly fueled by Cartier and others, may have caused some hesitation on the part of the prospective buyers, the McLeans, around 1911. When a lawsuit between buyer and seller erupted about the terms of the deal, newspapers kept alive reports of the diamond's "malevolent influence" with reports like this one, which blamed the stone's "curse" on having caused, of all things, the lawsuit itself:

The malevolent influence that has for centuries dogged with discord and disaster the owners of the famous Hope diamond has started again and without waste of time, despite special precautions against ill-luck taken at the time of its last sale, according to John S. Wise, Jr., of 20 Broad Street, attorney for Cartiers, the Fifth Avenue jewelers, who are suing Mr. and Mrs. Edward B. McLean for $180,000, its alleged purchase price.

— report in The New York Times, March 1911

The Hope Diamond was also blamed for the unhappy fates of other historical figures vaguely linked to its ownership, such as the falls of Madame Athenais de Montespan and French finance minister, Nicolas Fouquet, during the reign of Louis XIV; the beheadings of Louis XVI and Marie Antoinette and the rape and mutilation of the Princesse de Lamballe during the French Revolution; and the forced abdication of Turkish Sultan Abdul Hamid II who had supposedly killed various members of his court for the stone (despite the annotation in Habib's auction catalog). Even jewelers who may have handled the Hope Diamond were not spared from its reputed malice: the insanity and suicide of Jacques Colot, who supposedly bought it from Eliason, and the financial ruin of the jeweler Simon Frankel, who bought it from the Hope family, were linked to the stone. But although he is documented as a French diamond dealer of the correct era, Colot has no recorded connection with the stone, and Frankel's misfortunes were in the midst of economic straits that also ruined many of his peers.

The legend includes deaths of numerous other characters who had been previously unknown: Diamond cutter Wilhelm Fals, killed by his son Hendrik, who stole it and later committed suicide; Francois Beaulieu, who received the stone from Hendrik but starved to death after selling it to Eliason; a Russian prince named Kanitowski, who lent it to French actress Lorens Ladue and promptly shot her dead on the stage, and was himself stabbed to death by revolutionaries; Simon Montharides, hurled over a precipice with his family. However, the existence of only a few of these characters has been verified historically, leading researchers to conclude that most of these persons are fictitious.

The actress May Yohe made repeated attempts to capitalize on her identity as the former wife of the last Hope to own the diamond, and sometimes blamed the gemstone for her misfortunes. In July 1902, months after Lord Francis divorced her, she told police in Australia that her lover, Putnam Strong, had abandoned her and taken her jewels. In fact, the couple reconciled, married later that year, but divorced in 1910. On her third marriage in 1920, she persuaded film producer George Kleine to back a 15-episode serial The Hope Diamond Mystery, which added fictitious characters to the tale, but the project was not successful. In 1921, she hired Henry Leyford Gates to help her write The Mystery of the Hope Diamond, in which she starred as Lady Francis Hope. The film added more characters, including a fictionalized Tavernier, and added Marat among the diamond's "victims". She also wore her copy of the Hope, trying to generate more publicity to further her career.

Evalyn Walsh McLean added her own narrative to the story behind the blue jewel, including that one of the owners had been Catherine the Great, although there are no confirmations that the Russian ruler ever owned the diamond. McLean would bring the Diamond out for friends to try on, including Warren G. Harding and Florence Harding.

Since the Smithsonian acquired the gemstone, the "curse appears to have gone dormant." Owning the diamond has brought "nothing but good luck" for the nonprofit national museum, according to a Smithsonian curator, and has helped it build a "world-class gem collection" with rising attendance levels.

=== Owners and their fates ===
What happened to owners and wearers of the gem
| Date acquired | Owner | Fate | Notes |
|---|---|---|---|
| 1653 | Jean-Baptiste Tavernier | Lived 1605–1689; died age 84 | Acquired between 1640 and 1667, possibly 1653 |
| 1668 | Louis XIV | Long prosperous reign; lived 1638–1715, died age 76 | |
| 1722 | Louis XV | Lived 1710–1774, died age 64 | |
| 1775 | Louis XVI | Guillotined in 1793, age 38 | |
| 1775 | Marie Antoinette | Guillotined 1793, age 37 | Wife of Louis XVI |
| 1792 | | | |
| 1805? | George IV | Lived 1762–1830, died age 67 | Doubtful whether he ever owned it |
| 1812 | Daniel Eliason, a London jeweler | Died 17 November 1824, aged 71 | |
| 1830 | Thomas Hope | Lived 1769–1831, died age 62 | |
| 1839 | Henry Philip Hope | | |
| 1861 | Henry Pelham-Clinton, 6th Duke of Newcastle | Lived 1834–1879, died age 45 | |
| 1884 | Lord Francis Hope | Bankruptcy; forced to sell it; lived 1866–1941 died age 75 | |
| 1894 | May Yohé | Musical actress, divorced, remarried several times, died poor, age 72 | Wife of Lord Francis Hope |
| 1901 | Adolf Weil, London jewel merchant | | |
| 1901 | Simon Frankel | | |
| 1908 | Selim Habib (Salomon? Habib) | | Possibly as agent for Turkish Sultan Abdulhamid II. |
| 1908 | Sultan Abdul Hamid II of Turkey | Deposed 1909; died 1918, age 75 | Disputed whether the Sultan ever owned it. |
| 1909 | Simon Rosenau | | |
| 1910 | Pierre Cartier | Lived 1878–1964, died age 86 | |
| 1911 | Edward Beale McLean and Evalyn Walsh McLean | Couple divorced 1932; Edward had mental illness and died aged 51 or 52; Evalyn died aged 60 from pneumonia in 1947 | |
| 1947 | Harry Winston | Lived 1896–1978, died age 83 | Jeweler who gave it to Smithsonian 1958 |
| 1958 | Smithsonian Institution | Prospered, attendance up | |

== Replicas ==
In 2007, a lead cast of the French Blue diamond was discovered in the gemological collections of the National Museum of Natural History in Paris. This triggered an investigation by an international team of researchers into the stone's history, which previously had to rely on two-dimensional sketches of the diamond. The three-dimensional structure allowed researchers to apply techniques such as computer-aided drawing analysis.

The methods for digitally-reconstructing the gem are reviewed in this article's "Theft and Disappearance" section. The emblem of the Golden Fleece of Louis XV was reconstructed around the French Blue, including the "Côte de Bretagne" spinel of 107 carats (21.4 g; 0.75 oz), the "Bazu" diamond of 32.62 carats (6.524 g; 0.2301 oz), 3 oriental topazes (yellow sapphires), five brilliants of up to 5 carats (1,000 mg; 0.035 oz) and nearly 300 smaller diamonds.

As part of the investigation, the "Tavernier Blue" diamond was reconstructed from the original French edition of Tavernier's Voyages (rather than the later London edition, which had distorted and modified Tavernier's original figures). The Smithsonian Institution provided ray-tracing and optical spectroscopic data about the Hope diamond.

The lead cast had been catalogued at the French museum in 1850 and was provided by a prominent Parisian jeweler named Charles Archard who lived during the same generation as René Just Haüy, who died in 1822. Most likely, the lead cast was made near 1815, because that was the year that similar entries from the 1850 catalogue had been made. The model was accompanied by a label stating that the French Blue was in the possession of a person known as "Mr. Hope of London". Other archives at the Muséum suggests that Hope was a customer of Achard for many years, particularly for blue gems.

These findings have helped investigators piece together what may have happened during the rock's anonymous years during the several decades following 1792. According to one line of reasoning, the first "Hope" to have the "Hope Diamond"—Henry Phillip Hope—might have possessed the French Blue that he had acquired some time after the 1792 robbery in Paris, perhaps around 1794–1795, when the Hopes were believed to have left Holland for London to escape Napoleon's armies. At about the same time, Cadet Guillot, who may have been one of the thieves to have stolen the Golden Fleece, arrived in London. This places Mr. Hope and Mr. Guillot in London at the same time. According to a late nineteenth-century historian named Bapts, a contract was made between Cadet Guillot and a French aristocrat named Lancry de la Loyelle, in 1796, to sell the 107-carat (21.4 g; 0.75 oz) spinel-dragon of the Golden Fleece. According to this line of reasoning, in 1802 Hope sold his assets, and the continental blockade by Napoleon led the Hope's bank into a serious financial crisis by 1808, and the crisis peaked during the winter of 1811–1812 This put Mr. Hope in a financial bind. There is a possibility that, given his financial predicament, Hope pawned the French Blue to jewel merchant Eliason to get much-needed cash when the British currency, sterling, was highly depreciated. This is consistent with the entry in Eliason's records about having the stone in 1812.

However, the diamond's owners may have felt pressure to recut the stone quickly to disguise its identity, since if the French government had learned of its existence, it may have sued the owners for repossession. Regardless of whether Mr. Hope had lost possession or kept it during these years, by 1824 it was again in his possession. It was around this time that Eliason died; Hope's financial situation had been restored thanks to efforts by the Barings, who saved the Hope bank in the difficult financial years of 1812–1820. Accordingly, if this is correct, then the lead cast of the French Blue and the "Hope" diamond are likely to have been created in the same workshop, possibly in London, and probably a little before 1812.

The lead cast had important ramifications since it gave enough information to curators at the French museum to commission the first exact replicas of both the Tavernier and French Blue diamonds using a material which simulates diamonds called cubic zirconia, with the help of artisans who work with gems (lapidaries), led by Scott Sucher. These replicas have been completed and displayed with the French Crown Jewels and the Great Sapphire of Louis XIV, a Moghul-cut sapphire of 135.7 carats (27.14 g; 0.957 oz). Artisans recreated the elaborate parure of different-colored gems known as the Golden Fleece of King Louis XV of France, which is arguably the most fabulous work in the history of French jewelry; this happened from 2007 to 2010. The original parure, created in 1749 by royal jeweler Pierre-André Jacquemin, was stolen and broken in 1792. The reassembled jewel contained the French Blue and the Bazu diamonds, as well as the Côte de Bretagne spinel and hundreds of smaller diamonds. Three years of work were needed to recreate this jewel, and it required exacting and precise skill which revealed not only the skill of today's lapidaries, but the skill of its original eighteenth-century designers. The reconstructed jewel was presented by Herbert Horovitz, with François Farges of the French museum in attendance, at the former Royal Storehouse in Paris on June 30, 2010, which was the same site where the original had been stolen 218 years before.

Additional recreations were made possible by new discoveries. A previously unknown drawing of the Golden Fleece was rediscovered in Switzerland in the 1980s, and two blue diamonds that had ornamented the jewel were found as well, and these recent findings enabled artisans to recreate a copy of the emblem. It led to the construction, using cubic zirconia, of a piece that almost exactly resembles the 69-carat (13.8 g; 0.49 oz) French Blue.

The emblem has another great blue diamond, which was later named "the Bazu" in reference to a dealer who reportedly had sold it to Louis XIV in 1669. This Bazu diamond was recut in 1749 as a baroque cushion weighing 32.62 carats (6.524 g; 0.2301 oz). The 1791 inventory mentioned that the Bazu was "light sky blue", which is consistent with the fact that the Golden Fleece of the Color Adornment was made of a variety of great colored gems. Based on documents kept in a private collection, it could be shown that this particular diamond was not hexagonal-shaped, as some historians had previously thought, but was in a shape best described as "rounded squared", similar to the so-called Régent diamond. There is a report that a curator from the French museum will assert that the hexagonal cut from the Bazu is inconsistent historically and gemologically. The Bazu stone referred to another version of Louis XV's great Golden Fleece, made out of blue sapphires instead of blue diamonds. According to one view, this version appears to have never been manufactured but only suggested to the king as an alternative to the effective final version, bearing two blue diamonds. Nevertheless, replicas of both blue diamonds were cut by Scott Sucher using cubic zirconia, one deep blue and the other light blue.

The emblem had a third great gem known as The Côte de Bretagne dragon. Its replica was based on a wax likeness sculpted by Pascal Monney, who had based his recreation from three-dimensional scaled pictures of the original object which had been made by French artist François Farges; Farges, in turn, had seen the original objects displayed at the Louvre's Galerie d'Apollon. In addition, artist Etienne Leperlier cast a "crystal" lead glass duplicate of the wax replica of the carved Côte de Bretagne. Its pigmentation is made out of gold and manganese pigments to simulate as close as possible the original color of the spinel.

The 500-plus remaining replicas of diamonds were cut from cubic zirconia using a baroque cushion cut. Colors were used to recall the original artwork: red for the flames, and yellow for the fleece, and in keeping with the original work, the materials used were initially colorless but were painted in the same fashion used by the artist Jacquemin when the original Golden Fleece was completed in 1749. Since the original was most likely made out of gold plated with silver, a choice was made to use a matrix mostly made out of 925-grade silver to reduce costs without compromising quality. A number of artists contributed to this project:

- The silver matrix was carved by Jean Minassian of Geneva who used historical drawings of the delicate three-dimensional elements of the dragon's wings and tail as well as the palms around which the dragon is suspended.
- Casts were made by Andreas Altmann. This will allow more copies to be made in the future.
- Amico Bifulci gilded parts of the matrix to recreate the gold and silver arrangement of the original.

All stones were set according to 18th-century techniques. Finally, a luxury box containing the Golden Fleece was recreated by Frédéric Viollet using crimson-colored Moroccan leather. The box was gilded by Didier Montecot to the arms of Louis XV, using the king's original iron stamp made by the Simier house, the official bookbinders of the kings of France. A dark red ribbon, made of crimson satin moire, holds the jewel inside the box.

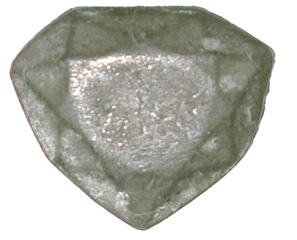
Lead cast of the "French Blue" diamond, discovered in 2007 at the National Museum of Natural History (France) by Farges (ca. 31 mm × 26 mm (1.2 in × 1.0 in)).

Computer reconstruction of the "French Blue" diamond, as cut by Jean Pitau for Louis XIV in 1673 (ca. 31 mm × 25 mm (1.22 in × 0.98 in)).

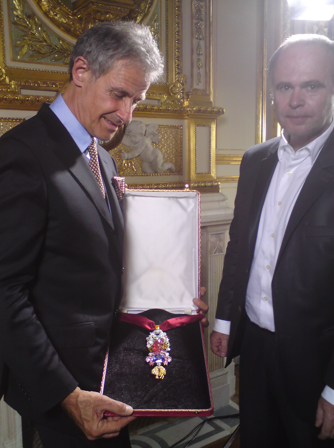
The recreated great Golden Fleece of Louis XV, presented by H. Horovitz (left) and François Farges (right) at the Hôtel de la Marine, formerly the royal Storehouse in Paris, on June 30, 2010.

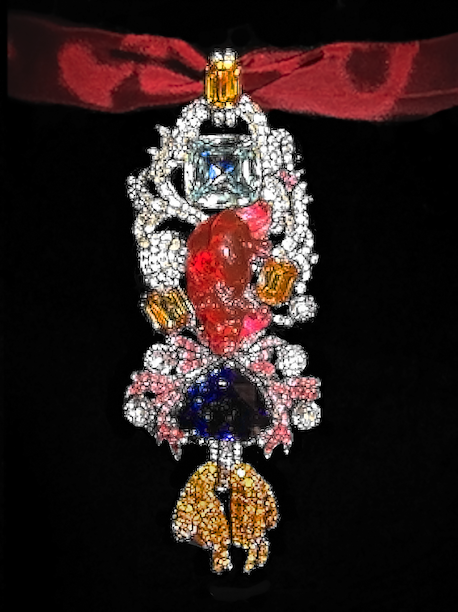
Detailed view of the recreated great Golden Fleece of king Louis XV of France. Below the 107 carats (21.4 g; 0.75 oz) spinel Côte de Bretagne hangs the French Blue diamond and the fleece itself, set with hundreds of yellow diamond replicas.

== See also ==
- Crown Jewels of the United Kingdom
- List of diamonds
- National Museum of Natural History
