= Daniel Eliason =

London diamond merchant (1753 - 1824)

Daniel Eliason (c. 1753 – 17 November 1824) was a London diamond merchant in the late 18th century and early 19th century.

== Life ==
He was in partnership with Abraham Goldsmid, and married his sister, Sarah Goldsmid.

It was reported in 1822 that a violet-coloured diamond had been purchased by George IV for £20,000 (equivalent to £2,200,000 in 2025) and that Mr. Eliason of Hatton Garden was setting it.

His death was reported in the New Times (London) on 19 December with the following short obituary:

Died yesterday, at his house in Hatton-garden, Daniel Eliason, Esq., the eminent diamond merchant, in the 71st year of his age. This gentleman was much esteemed by the members of the Hebrew religion, as well as by all who knew him. By his death many charitable institutions are deprived of a benevolent and valuable subscriber, more particularly the Jews Hospital, Society for the Relief of Foreigners in Distress, &c.&c. and indeed there was scarcely any charitable institution to which this gentelman did not bountifully contribute.

== Hope Diamond ==
A blue diamond with the same shape, size, and color as the Hope Diamond was recorded in Eliason's possession in September 1812, the earliest point when the history of the Hope Diamond can be definitively fixed. John Francillon wrote a memorandum describing the large superfine blue diamond. It is often pointed out that this date was almost exactly 20 years after the theft of the French Blue, just as the statute of limitations for the crime had expired.

Eliason's diamond may have been acquired by King George IV. There is no record of the ownership in the Royal Archives at Windsor, but some secondary evidence exists in the form of contemporary writings and artwork, and George IV tended to commingle the state property of the Royal Jewels with family heirlooms and his own personal property.

It is thought that Francis Beaulieu, who came from Marseille to London, arranged to sell the diamond to Eliason. Beaulieu fell terribly ill from jail fever and died in a poor humble lodging. When Eliason went round to pay over the money Beaulieu was dead and the money never changed hands. Eliason killed himself some months afterwards, but before he did so he sold the diamond (this was in about 1830) to Henry Thomas Hope of Deepdene, Surrey.
