= Tavernier Blue =

Large, rare, blue diamond

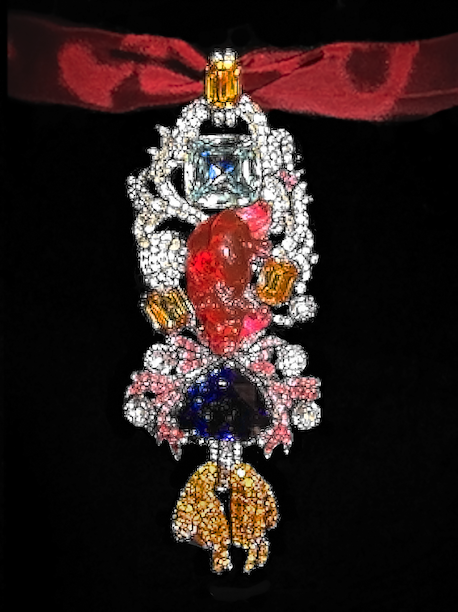
Detailed view of the recreated great Golden Fleece of king Louis XV of France. Below the 107 carats (21.4 g) spinel Côte de Bretagne hangs the French Blue diamond and the fleece itself, set with hundreds of yellow diamond replicas.

The Tavernier Blue was the precursor diamond to the Blue Diamond of the French Crown (aka the French Blue). Subsequently, most scholars and historians believed that it was re-cut and, after a disappearance and reemergence into the public forum, was renamed the Hope Diamond.

In December 2007, the French mineralogy professor François Farges found in the reserves of the Muséum national d'histoire naturelle the lead model of the Tavernier Blue. This model came around 1850, and was given by the Parisian jeweller Charles Achard, who explained that the Anglo-Dutch collector Henry Philip Hope was the owner of the original stone. Moreover, the size of the model definitively proved that the Tavernier Blue was bigger than the Hope. This latest piece of evidence proved that the widely held suspicions about the origin of the Hope Diamond were correct.

== Diamond details ==
Weighing 112 3/16 old French carats, (Note: 112 3/16 carats are equal to 115.16 modern metric carats. The Blue has been erroneously reported through the years by many as 110+/- carats) the crudely finished gem was described by the French gem dealer Jean-Baptiste Tavernier as being "violet" in color. (Note: Violet in those days was a considered a shade of blue) and of perfect clarity. It is believed to have been a Type IIb diamond.

The diamond was certainly Indian in origin and likely sourced by Tavernier in 1666 at the Kollur mine of the Qutb Shahi dynasty's Golconda kingdom in today's Guntur district, Andhra Pradesh. The stone, only slightly finished at this time, was eventually cut to present a more diamond-like appearance, in 1775.

== Background and history ==
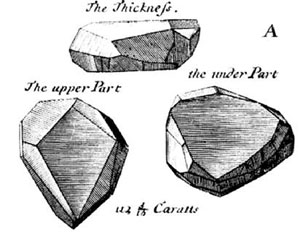
Tavernier's original sketch

Tavernier was a French traveler and trader who returned to France from India with many of the largest gems of the era. He primarily sold merchandise to French royalty and the aristocracy. Tavernier sold the Tavernier Blue to Louis XIV for cash. He also received a Patent of Nobility as part of the sales price. (Note: The Patent of Nobility is considered worth 450,000 French livres in currency of that time.)

The original stone was set into a cravat-pin in 1674, and became a central element in the elaborate Order of the Golden Fleece pendant in 1715. It and the fleece were placed into the French Crown Jewels in 1749. The Tavernier Blue was removed from the fleece and re-cut by court jeweler Jean Pitau into the 68-carat French Blue in 1775, on the orders of Louis XV. It was then returned to the Crown Jewels.

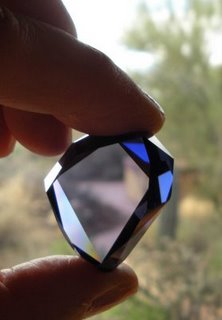
The cubic zirconia replica of the Tavernier Blue diamond created by Scott Sucher

The French Blue was stolen from the French Crown Jewels in 1792 during the turbulence of the French Revolution. It is generally believed that after the theft, the stone was cut into the 45.52-carat Hope Diamond and several smaller stones in an attempt to prevent its proper identification. This provenance was accepted by many historians and gemologists for years and was supported by research with 3D imaging and prototyping technology in 2005.

== Possible remnants ==
Another large blue diamond believed to have been taken from the Tavernier was originally set in a ring for Empress Maria Feodorovna, wife of Russian Emperor Paul I. It was given to the State Diamond Fund in 1860 by her daughter-in-law, the Empress Alexandra Feodorovna. Later, it was mounted into a stick pin. The 7.6-carat stone is preserved in the collection of the Alexander Palace in Tsarskoye Selo, near St Petersburg. The Russian stone's provenance as part of the Tavernier Blue is disputed.

== Research into the origin of the Hope diamond and the Crown blue diamond ==
=== Research in France and the United States ===
A great deal of research has been carried out to determine whether the Hope Diamond was actually cut from the Crown Blue Diamond in order to conceal its French origin. As early as 1856, the jeweller Charles Barbot compared the two diamonds by consulting the work of the historian Germain Bapst, which contained the only known representation of the blue diamond at the time (two imprecise engravings by Lucien Hirtz, depicting the actual size of the jewel on both sides). However, the Hope diamond does not ‘fit’ completely into the blue diamond. In his anthology of the Jewels of the French Crown, historian Bernard Morel attempts to reconstruct this diamond on the basis of these two engravings by Baptiste Morel. He assumes that these two engravings are approximate and has slightly but significantly stretched Hirtz's drawing of the blue diamond to Brisson's dimensions so that it can contain the Hope diamond.

Recent American studies showing that the Hope was ‘undoubtedly’ cut from the Crown Blue Diamond are therefore subject to Brisson's intrinsic errors. Kurin in 2006 points out that these inaccuracies suggest that a reliable model of the Crown Blue Diamond needs to be known in order to definitively settle this question.

=== Latest discoveries ===
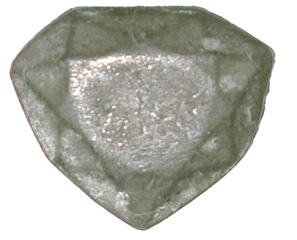
The lead model found at the Muséum national d'histoire naturelle by Farges in Paris at the end of 2007 (approx. 31 × 26 mm)

The one and only lead model of the French royal diamond was finally discovered in December 2007 by mineralogy professor François Farges during the cleaning of a mineralogical collection in the reserves of the Muséum national d'histoire naturelle. The back of the lead shows a corolla of 7 petals characteristic of the ‘Paris rose’ cut of Tavernier's blue diamond.

François Farges then carried out historical research on this lead: he found in the mineralogical collections the original label of the lead, which had been donated around 1850 by the Parisian jeweller Charles Achard, who provided vital information on this mould: it stated that ‘Mr Hoppe [sic] of London ’ had indeed owned the blue diamond in London.

This discovery showed that the blue diamond was much better cut than previously thought. The model also shows that the Hope diamond was cut between 1792 (when the French diamond was stolen) and 1812 (when the English blue diamond appeared).

Finally, according to the Museum's archives, it was Henry Philip Hope, after the death of his brother Thomas, who was the legal owner of the cut diamond until his death in 1839. It would appear that the London jewellers Eliason and Françillon acted as fronts to conceal the actual origin of the diamond, and that it was therefore a case of concealment.

== See also ==
- List of diamonds
