= Early Jurassic =

First epoch of the Jurassic Period

Early/Lower Jurassic
- 201.3 ± 0.2 – 174.7 ± 0.8 Ma
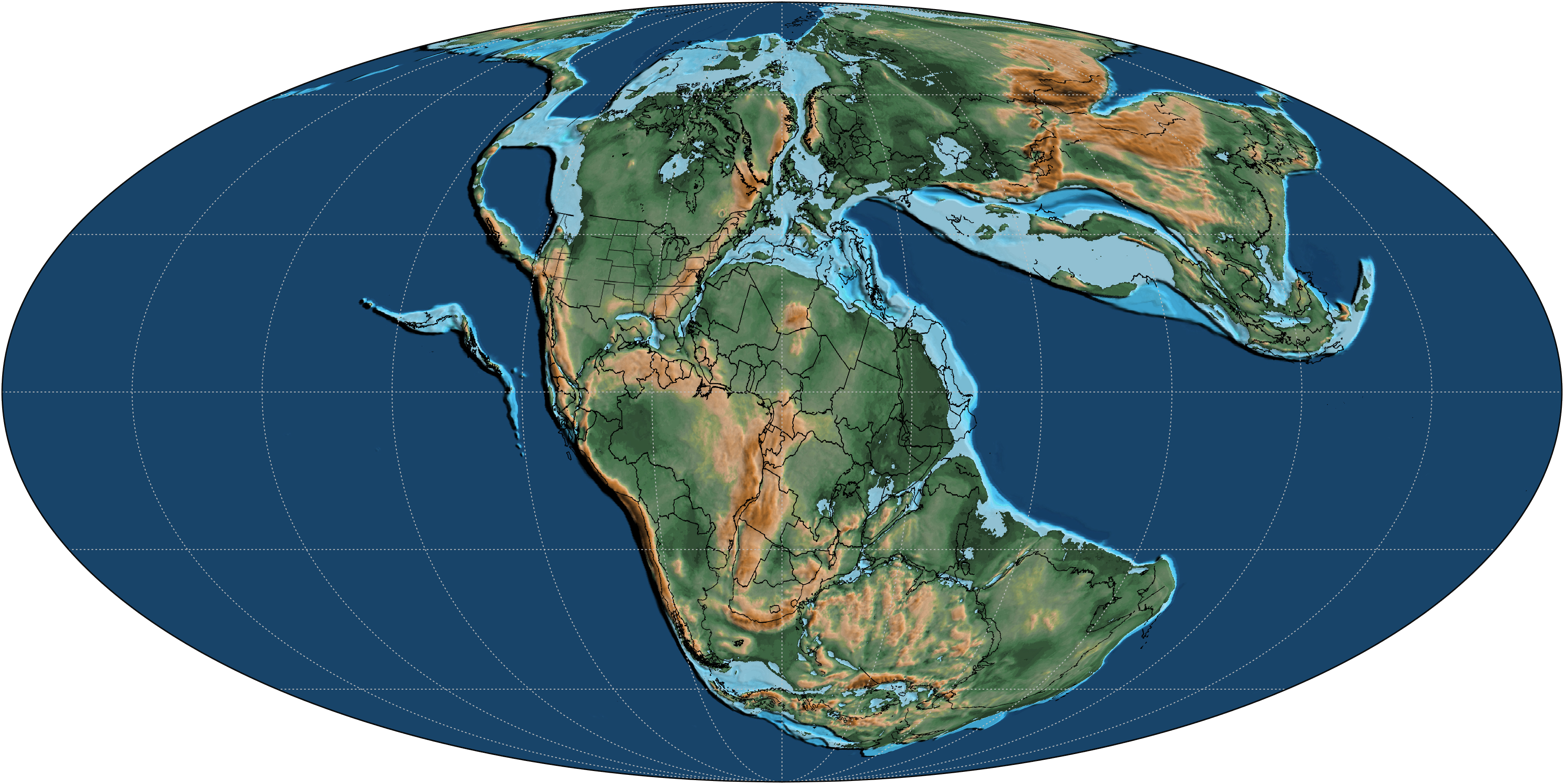
- A map of Earth as it appeared 190 million years ago during the Early Jurassic Epoch, Pliensbachian Age

Chronology
← / Triassic–Jurassic extinction event
Subdivision of the Jurassic according to the ICS, as of 2024. Vertical axis scale: Millions of years ago

Etymology
- Chronostratigraphic name: Lower Jurassic
- Geochronological name: Early Jurassic
- Name formality: Formal

Usage information
- Celestial body: Earth
- Regional usage: Global (ICS)
- Time scale(s) used: ICS Time Scale

Definition
- Chronological unit: Epoch
- Stratigraphic unit: Series
- Time span formality: Formal
- Lower boundary definition: FAD of the Ammonite Psiloceras spelae tirolicum.
- Lower boundary GSSP: Kuhjoch section, Karwendel mountains, Northern Calcareous Alps, Austria; 47.4839°N 11.5306°E
- Lower GSSP ratified: 2010
- Upper boundary definition: FAD of the Ammonites Leioceras opalinum and Leioceras lineatum
- Upper boundary GSSP: Fuentelsaz, Spain; 41.1708°N 1.8333°W
- Upper GSSP ratified: 2000

The Early Jurassic Epoch (in chronostratigraphy corresponding to the Lower Jurassic Series) is the earliest of three epochs of the Jurassic Period. The Early Jurassic starts immediately after the Triassic–Jurassic extinction event, 201.3 Ma (million years ago), and ends at the start of the Middle Jurassic 174.7 ±0.8 Ma.

Certain rocks of marine origin of this age in Europe are called "Lias" and that name was used for the period, as well, in 19th-century geology. In southern Germany rocks of this age are called Black Jurassic.

== Origin of the name Lias ==
There are two possible origins for the name Lias: the first reason is it was taken by a geologist from an English quarryman's dialect pronunciation of the word "layers"; secondly, sloops from north Cornish ports such as Bude would sail across the Bristol Channel to the Vale of Glamorgan to load up with rock from coastal limestone quarries (lias and Carboniferous limestone from South Wales was used throughout North Devon/North Cornwall as it contains calcium carbonate to 'sweeten' (i.e.neutralise) the acidic Devonian and Carboniferous soils of the West Country); the Cornish would pronounce the layers of limestone as 'laiyers' or 'lias'; leac is Gaelic for "flat stone".

== Geology ==
=== Stratigraphy ===
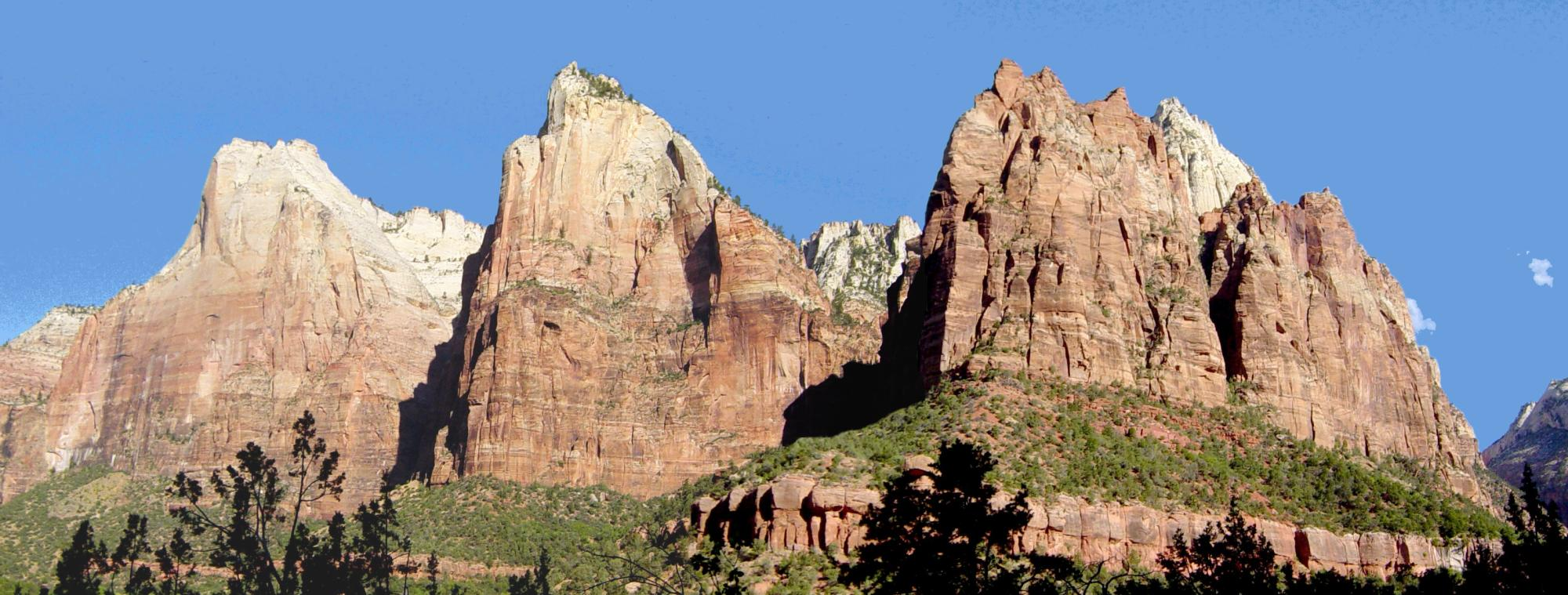
Massive cliffs in Zion Canyon consist of Lower Jurassic formations, including (from bottom to top): the Kayenta Formation and the massive Navajo Sandstone

There has been some debate over the actual base of the Hettangian Stage, and so of the Jurassic System itself. Biostratigraphically, the first appearance of psiloceratid ammonites has been used; but this depends on relatively complete ammonite faunas being present, a problem that makes correlation between sections in different parts of the world difficult. If this biostratigraphical indicator is used, then technically the Lias Group—a lithostratigraphical division—spans the Jurassic / Triassic boundary.

=== United Kingdom ===
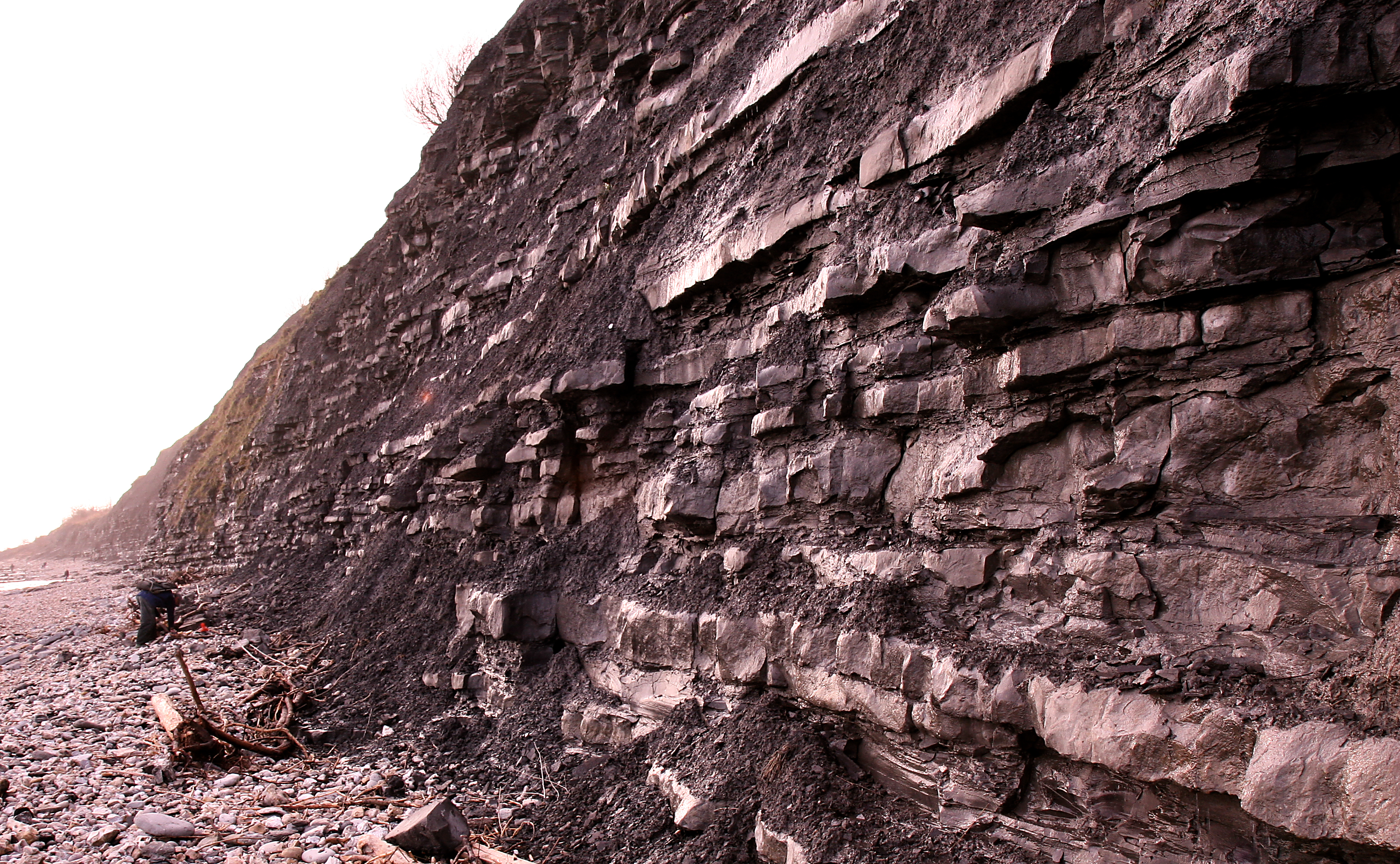
Lias formations at Lyme Regis, UK, known locally as Blue Lias

There are extensive Liassic outcrops around the coast of the United Kingdom, in particular in Glamorgan, North Yorkshire and Dorset. The 'Jurassic Coast' of Dorset is often associated with the pioneering work of Mary Anning of Lyme Regis. The facies of the Lower Jurassic in this area are predominantly of clays, thin limestones and siltstones, deposited under fully marine conditions.

Lias Group strata form imposing cliffs on the Vale of Glamorgan coast, in southern Wales. Stretching for around 14 miles (23 km) between Cardiff and Porthcawl, the remarkable layers of these cliffs, situated on the Bristol Channel are a rhythmic decimetre scale repetition of limestone and mudstone formed as a late Triassic desert was inundated by the sea.

== Life ==
=== Ammonites ===
During this period, ammonoids, which had almost died out at the end-of-Triassic extinction, radiated out into a huge diversity of new forms with complex suture patterns (the ammonites proper). Ammonites evolved so rapidly, and their shells are so often preserved, that they serve as important zone fossils. There were several distinct waves of ammonite evolution in Europe alone.

=== Marine reptiles ===
The Early Jurassic was an important time in the evolution of the marine reptiles. The Hettangian saw the already existing Rhaetian ichthyosaurs and plesiosaurs continuing to flourish, while at the same time a number of new types of these marine reptiles appeared, such as Ichthyosaurus and Temnodontosaurus among the ichthyosaurs, and Eurycleidus, Macroplata, and Rhomaleosaurus among the plesiosaurs (all Rhomaleosauridae, although as currently defined this group is probably paraphyletic). All these plesiosaurs had medium-sized necks and large heads. In the Toarcian, at the end of the Early Jurassic, the thalattosuchians (marine "crocodiles") appeared, as did new genera of ichthyosaurs (Stenopterygius, Eurhinosaurus, and the persistently primitive Suevoleviathan) and plesiosaurs (the elasmosaurs (long-necked) Microcleidus and Occitanosaurus, and the pliosaur Hauffiosaurus).

=== Terrestrial animals ===
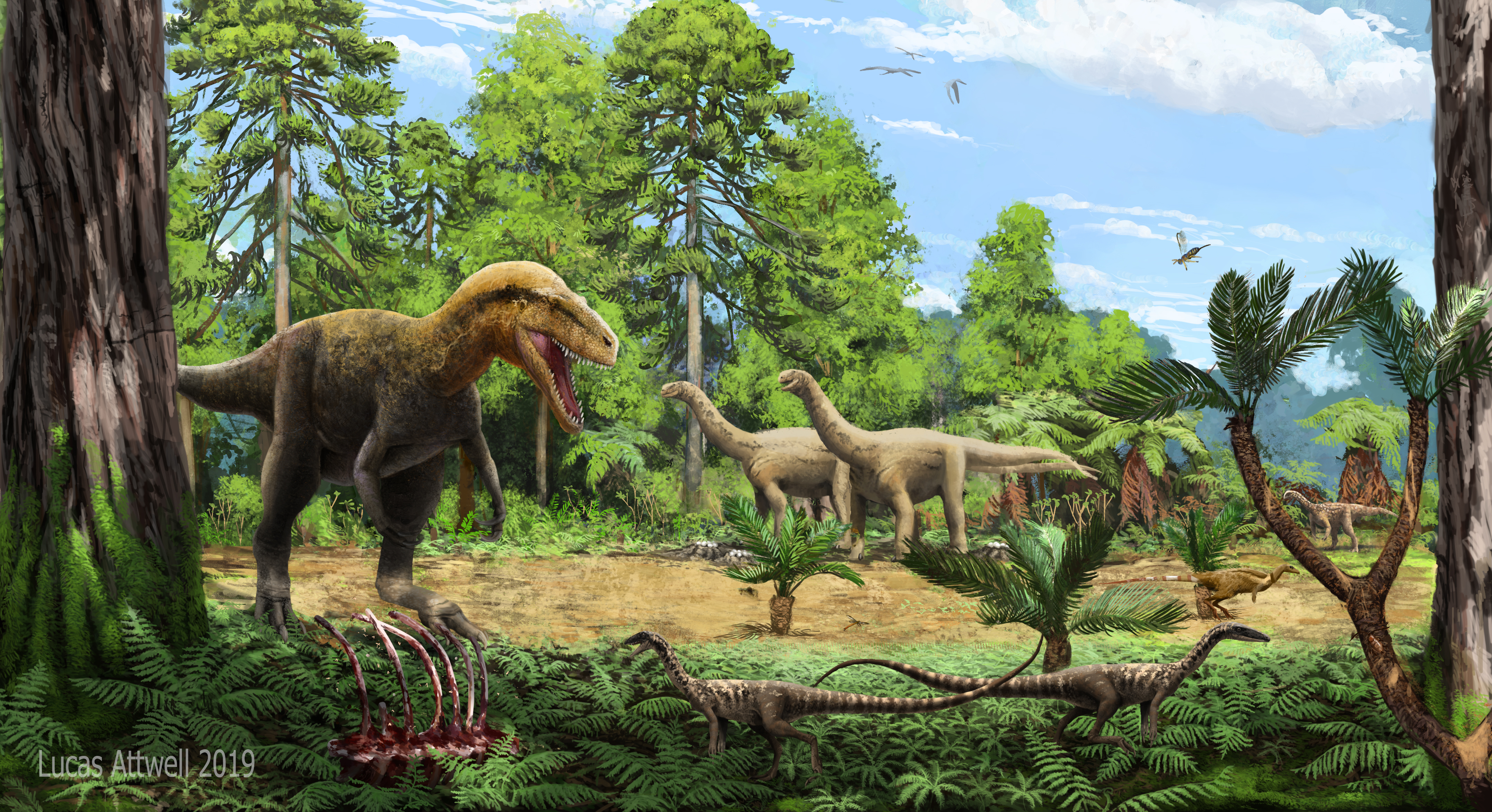
Terrestrial environment of the Pliensbachian-Toarcian boundary Fennoscandinavia, with flora based on the Sorthat Formation. Dinosaurs are based on material found on various locations of the German realm of the Ciechocinek Formation and on lesser extent, footprints of the Drzewica Formation

On land, a number of new types of dinosaurs—the heterodontosaurids, dilophosaurus, scelidosaurs, stegosaurs, and tetanurans—appeared, and joined those groups like the coelophysoids, prosauropods and the sauropods that had continued over from the Triassic. Accompanying them as small carnivores were the sphenosuchian and protosuchid crocodilians. In the air, new types of pterosaurs replaced those that had died out at the end of the Triassic. But in the undergrowth were various types of early mammals, as well as tritylodont synapsids, lizard-like sphenodonts, and early lissamphibians.

== See also ==
- Late Triassic
- Toarcian turnover

== Sources ==
- Davies, A. M., An Introduction to Palaeontology, Thomas Murby & Co., London
- House, M.R. (1993) Geology of The Dorset Coast, The Geologists' Association.
- Simms, M.J., Chidlaw, N., Morton, N. and Page, K.N. (2004) British Lower Jurassic Stratigraphy, Geological Conservation Review Series, No. 30, Joint Nature Conservation Committee, Peterborough.
