= Art patronage =

Private support for the arts

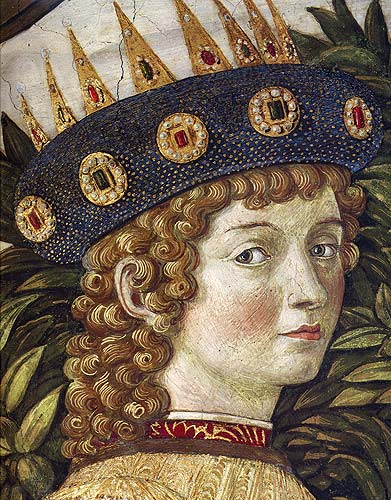
Lorenzo de' Medici, known as Lorenzo the Magnificent, one of the first great patrons. Detail of a fresco by Benozzo Gozzoli.

Patronage refers to the act of supporting—and sometimes promoting—the arts and literature through commissions or private financial assistance, whether the patronage is a natural person or a legal entity such as a company. In a broader sense, it can also apply to any area of public interest: research, education, the environment, sport, solidarity, innovation, and related fields..

At the heart of philanthropy, corporate patronage has become increasingly prevalent. It is defined as financial, human, or material support provided by a company without direct consideration in return, as well as through the generosity of certain billionaires. In taxation and accounting terms, it is considered a donation. Patronage benefits from advantageous tax treatment when there is a marked disproportion between the amount given and the benefits received. However, patronage should not be confused with sponsorship because, unlike sponsorship, it does not require any consideration in return.

== History ==
=== From Antiquity to the Middle Ages ===
In French, the term used for art patronage is mécénat, and several other European languages have a similar one word expression. This word derives from Gaius Cilnius Maecenas, protector of the arts and letters in ancient Rome. Over time, it came to designate any individual or legal person who supports a cultural project or an artist through influence or financial means. Throughout history, patronage has varied in importance and has been marked by prominent figures. One speaks, for example, of the patronage of medieval princesses such as Mahaut, Countess of Artois and Isabeau of Bavière, whose commissions sustained numerous artists.

=== Renaissance (14th–16th centuries) ===
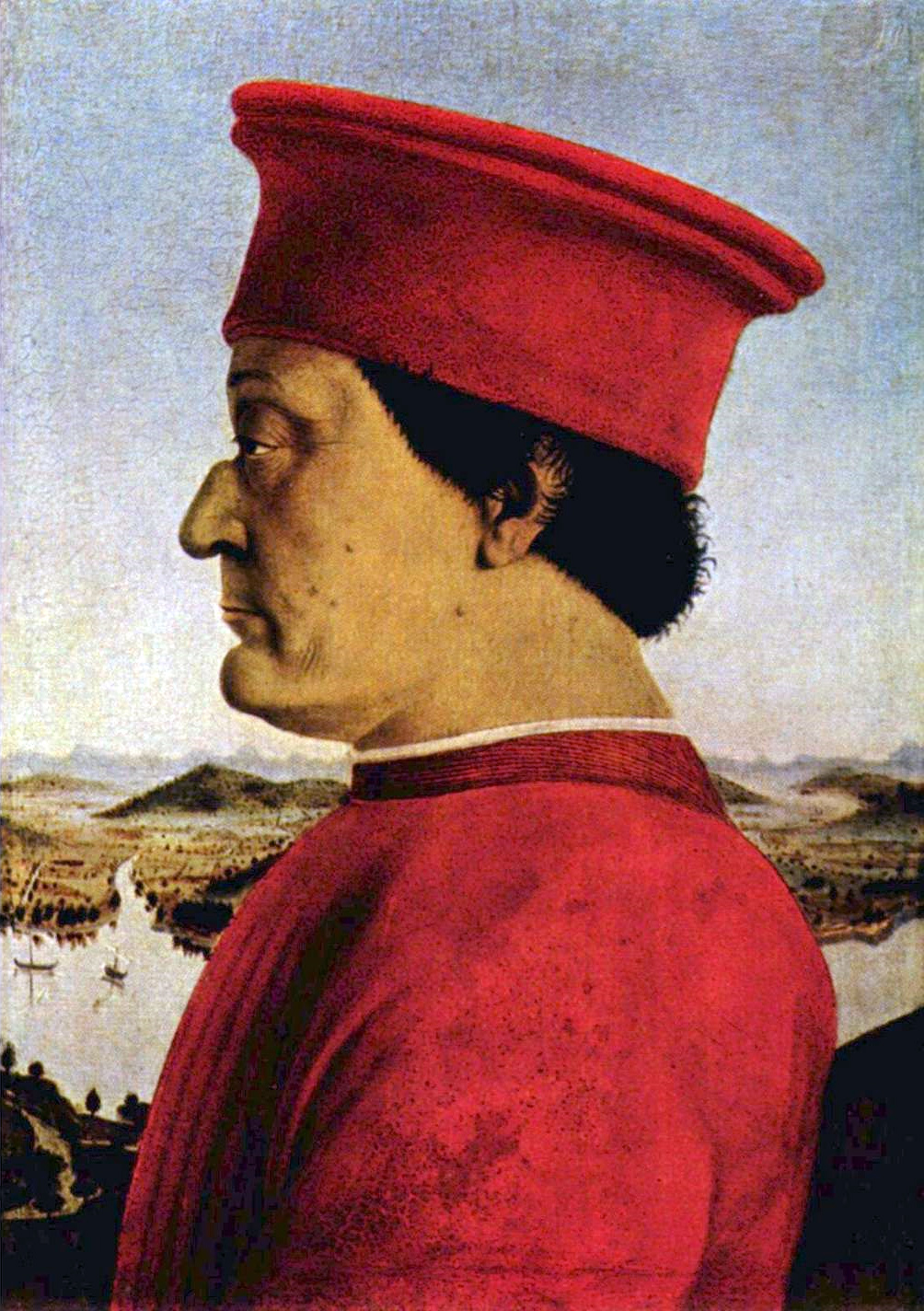
Federico da Montefeltro, Duke of Urbino, one of the most powerful princely patrons of the Renaissance. Painting The Triumph of Chastity by Piero della Francesca.

The golden age of patronage corresponds to the Italian Renaissance. In Florence, the Arti guilds, which protected merchant corporations, also financed the fine arts by commissioning works for religious buildings (notably the Arte di Calimala). The Medici, especially Lorenzo de' Medici, are renowned for their support of artists, enabling their fame. Lorenzo protected numerous figures including Michelangelo, Andrea del Verrocchio, architects Giuliano da Maiano and Giuliano da Sangallo, and humanists such as Giovanni Pico della Mirandola. In Ferrara, Ercole I d'Este played a comparable role. The Sienese banker Agostino Chigi supported artists and writers including Perugino, Giovanni da Udine, Giulio Romano, Baldassare Peruzzi, Sebastiano del Piombo, Il Sodoma, Raphael, and Pietro Aretino.

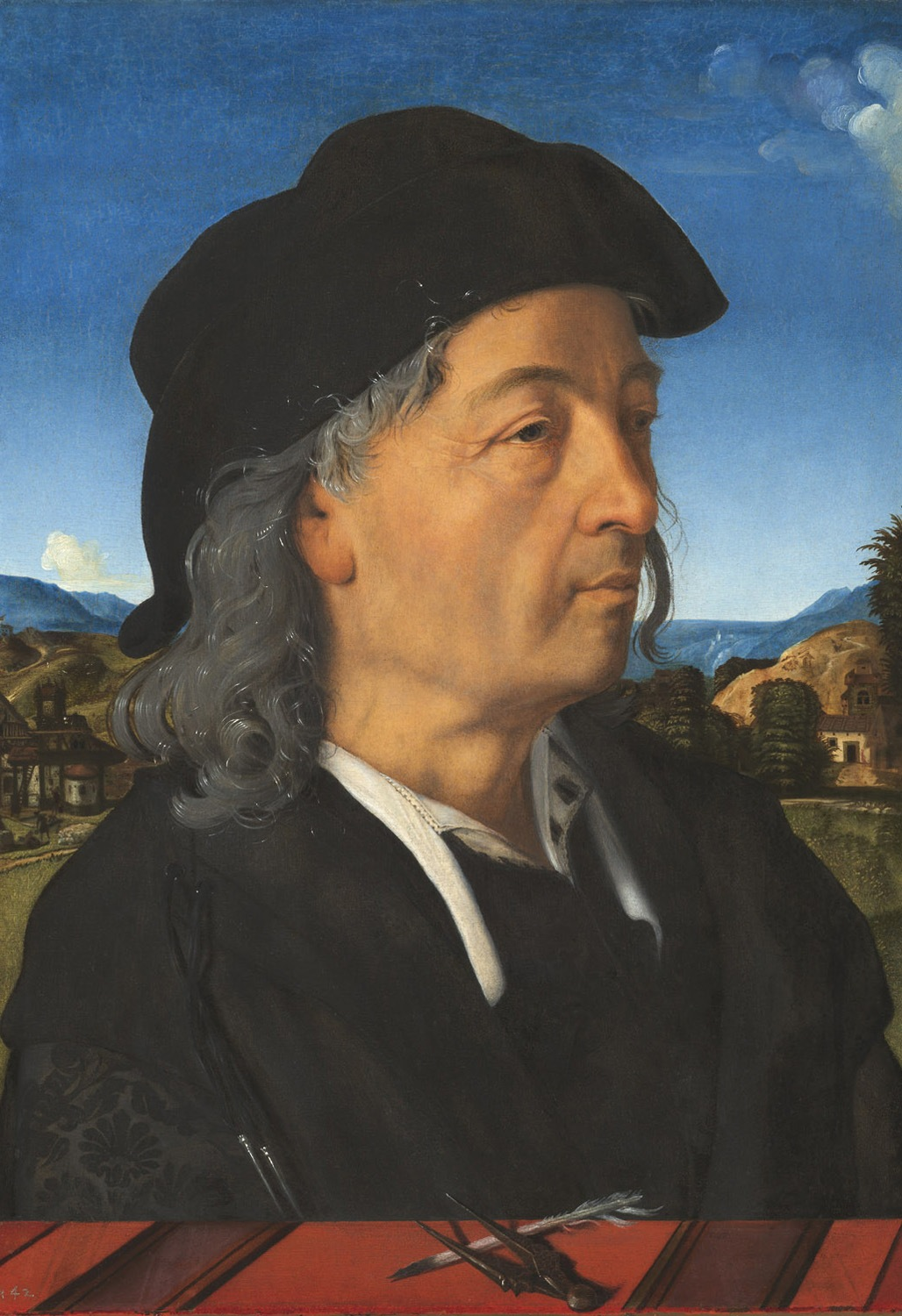
Portrait of Giuliano da Sangallo by Piero di Cosimo, between 1500 and 1520.

In France, Cardinal Georges d'Amboise was among the principal introducers of the Renaissance. King Francis I of France and the Constable Anne de Montmorency were also great patrons of the Arts. The king used patronage to demonstrate his power One example is the Château de Fontainebleau, which welcomed many Italian and French artists, including Leonardo da Vinci, whom Francis I brought back from Italy in 1516 and installed at Amboise at the Château du Clos Lucé.

Emperor Rudolf II, Holy Roman Emperor was likewise an important patron, confirming the privileges of the painters' guild in 1595 and acquiring numerous paintings by Titian, Albrecht Dürer, and the Brueghels, which he displayed at Prague Castle. The Italian painter Giuseppe Arcimboldo portrayed him as Vertumnus and was rewarded with the title of Count Palatine.

Other notable patrons of the Renaissance in France were the House of Guise and Montmorency families, who actively supported the new style of art and architecture. In Scandinavia, Henrik Rantzau, the governor of Holstein, had no fewer than twenty-five residences built or rebuilt and collected more than six thousand books. In the Czech Renaissance, Peter Vok of Rozmberk played an important role, as did his brother Vilém. In Spain, there was Don Diego Hurtado de Mendoza. In Poland, there was Chancellor Jan Zamoyski. In England, Robert Dudley was an important patron of the arts. Most notably, there was Alexander Farnese, who had the Farnese Palace built in Rome, Cardinal Granvelle, an important minister of Philip II, and William Cecil.

=== 17th to 19th centuries ===
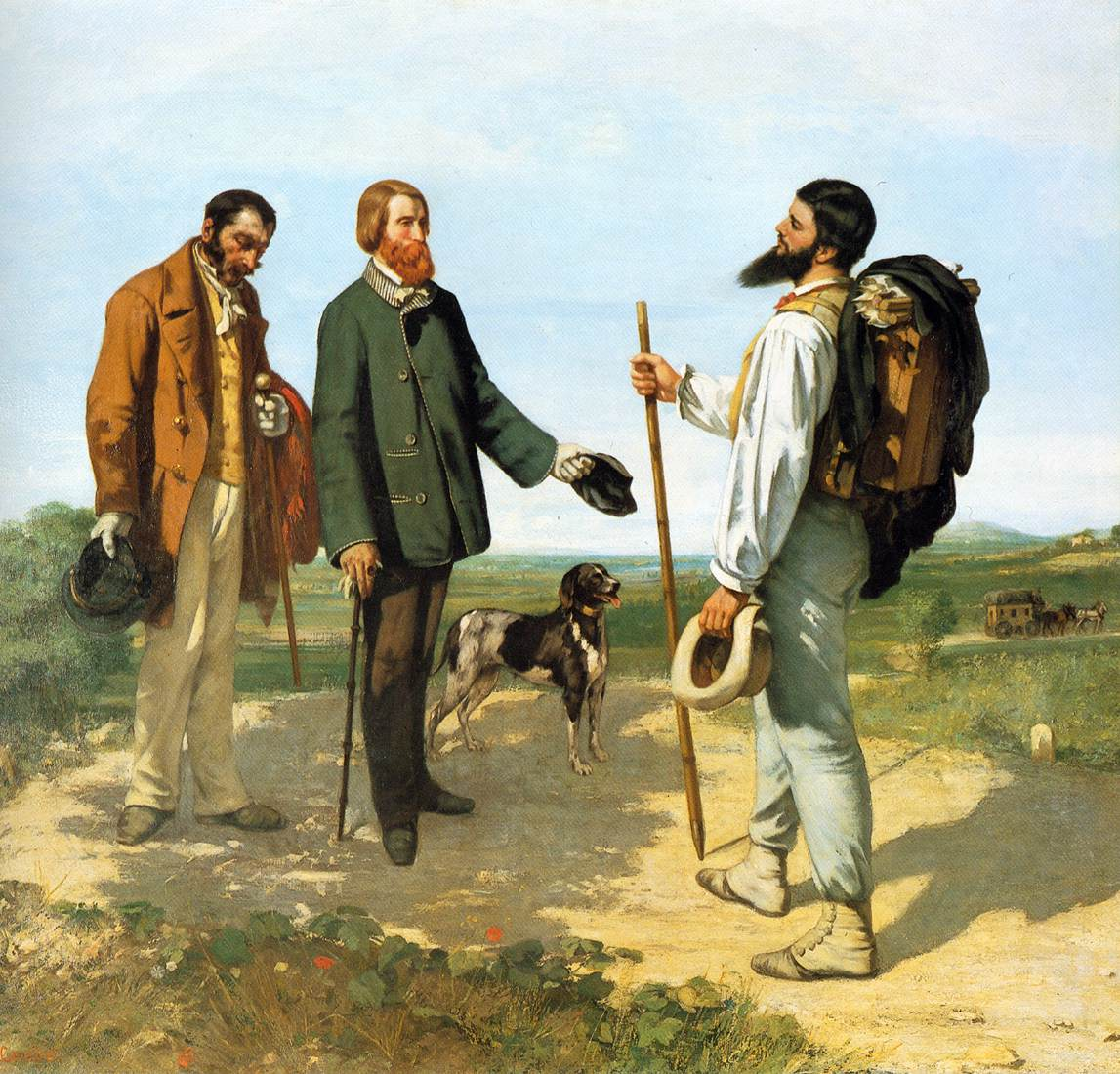
The Meeting (Bonjour Monsieur Courbet) by Gustave Courbet, showing the artist (right) meeting Alfred Bruyas and his servant.

In Italy during the 18th century was home to several important patrons of the art, such as Ferdinando de' Medici, Grand Prince of Tuscany, Cardinals Pietro Ottoboni and Benedetto Pamphilj, and Aurora Sanseverino.

In France Catherine de' Medici was one of the greatest patrons of the 16th century, supporting artists, poets, musicians, and architects at court. In the following century, Cardinal Mazarin built the Collège des Quatre-Nations and introduced Charles Le Brun to Louis XIV. Madame de Pompadour and Joseph Paris Duverney financed the construction of the École Militaire (1751–1756).

Russia had several patrons of the arts in the 18th and 19th centuries and early 20th century, including Ivan Shuvalov, Pavel Tretyakov, Savva Mamonto, Savva Morozov, Ivan Morozov, and Margarita Morozova.

In the 19th century, the painter Gustave Courbet, a friend of Pierre-Joseph Proudhon, changed the game by bringing forth the figure of the free artist, and personally claimed his autonomy in his artistic choices from patrons, whether they came from economic or political power. One of his paintings, La Rencontre, symbolized his convictions, depicting the painter meeting one of his buyers and most loyal supporters, Alfred Bruyas, without any trace of the deference usually expected between an artist and his patrons.

=== 20th and 21st centuries ===
The 20th century marked a renewal of patronage in the United States and Europe. Among the great names of the era were Charles de Noailles, Marie-Laure de Noailles, the Rothschild family, Alexis de Redé, Peggy Guggenheim, the Marquis de Cuevas, Marcellin and Pierre Bergé, and Yves Saint Laurent.

In France in the 21st century, there are a few individuals who deserve special mention, particularly for their patronage of contemporary art: Antoine de Galbert businessman and founder of La Maison Rouge), a foundation promoting various forms of contemporary art; Ariane de Rothschild who manages various foundations and gave her name to the Prix Ariane de Rothschild, an annual award for contemporary artists Prix Ariane de Rothschild), an annual award for contemporary artists; Alain-Dominique Perrin, former CEO of Cartier SA), and founder of the Fondation Cartier pour l’art contemporain; Bernard Arnault businessman and CEO of LVMH, with the Louis Vuitton corporate foundation.

A new trend that seems to be gaining momentum at the start of the 21st century is the creation of exhibition spaces by foundations, or even the temporary privatization of public spaces. This can be seen in Paris, with the Bulgari exhibition at the Grand Palais in 2013, followed by the Cartier exhibition at the same venue in 2014. There are also nomadic exhibitions, such as Chanel's Petite Veste Noire exhibition, which traveled from Paris and London to major cities in Asia. And at the Palais de Tokyo in Paris, there was the Roger Vivier shoe exhibition, followed by an exhibition dedicated to Chanel's No. 5 perfume, which some visitors perceived as a rental of space.

More and more public services and institutions, cultural or otherwise, are planning to use participatory sponsorship to finance projects of general interest. However, they are unsure about the best way to reach potential donors: whether to use a general or more specialized crowdfunding platform, or to solicit donations directly from internet users via their website, or even from the public directly at their premises.

== Economics ==
=== France ===
In France, from the monarchy to the Republic, passing through the Empire, art was for a long time primarily a matter of the state. According to Guy de Brébisson, the legitimacy of corporate patronage today remains weaker in France than in the United States, even though attitudes have evolved significantly since the 1980s. It remains largely a practice of large companies, but the participation of small and medium-sized enterprises is no longer negligible at the local and regional levels. Provincial companies represented only 12.5% of corporate patrons in 1985, but 41% by the early 1990s.

In 1994, the scale of corporate patronage in France was estimated at 800 million francs, while the budget of the Ministry of Culture (France), excluding major public works, amounted to 13.5 billion francs (about 1% of the state budget). Expenditures by local authorities represented nearly twice that amount.

In 2008, corporate patronage activities by companies with more than 20 employees were estimated at €2.5 billion in France. This amount was distributed among culture (40%), solidarity (32%), environment (15%), research (9%), and sports (5%). The share contributed by companies to culture (nearly €1 billion) therefore represented 44% of the financial contributions of the Ministry of Culture (France) in 2008.

Company size also influences patronage: 60% of large companies support associations, compared with 36% of small and medium-sized enterprises (SMEs) and 20% of very small enterprises (VSEs).

Environmental patronage has developed since the 1990s, particularly as part of companies’ efforts to "green" their activities, although this has also raised concerns about greenwashing. A Corporate Patronage Mission exists within the Ministry of Ecological Transition (France), and a practical, legal, and fiscal guide to environmental patronage has been published by the Commissariat général au développement durable.

In 2010, the French Minister of Culture at the time, Frédéric Mitterrand, emphasized that "the responsibility of the state and public authorities in general is not only to finance cultural life, but also to encourage initiatives from civil society".

=== Economic importance of foundations ===
Corporate patronage generally takes place through the creation of foundations, particularly in Anglo-Saxon countries. In the United States, there were 62,000 foundations in 2006, investing $3.6 billion annually in culture. The two most important in this field are the Ford Foundation (around $80 million per year) and the Reynolds Foundation ($58 million per year). In France, there were 2,100 foundations in the same year, compared with 14,000 in Denmark, 10,000 in Germany, 8,800 in the United Kingdom, and 3,300 in Italy.

A report by the Inspection Générale des Finances published in April 2017 estimated that the assets held by foundations in France amounted to €22 billion, while foundations in Germany held about €100 billion and those in the United Kingdom about €70 billion. The same report notes that "several countries allow foundations to have a commercial purpose, so that they are used as tools for holding and protecting companies—54% of Danish stock market capitalization is said to be held by foundations."

The scope of action of foundations can be broad, ranging from painting to photography, as well as literature and architecture. The Fondation du patrimoine, for example, aims to finance the restoration of local heritage that will never be officially listed as a historic monument. The World Monuments Fund, financed by American patrons, has funded the restoration of 450 monuments in 90 countries, including the cloister of Church of Saint-Trophime in Arles and Preah Khan in Cambodia.

== Legal and fiscal framework ==
=== United States ===
American foundations, like non-profit organizations, are governed by Section 501c3 of the Internal Revenue Code of the United States tax system. As a result, they are considered semi-public (because they serve the public interest and do not operate according to market rules) and semi-private (because of their capital, organization, and operating methods).

=== France ===
In France, several laws since the 1990s gradually changed the legal framework for patronage and foundations. The most recent being the Law of 4 August 2008, on the modernization of the economy, which created a new structure, the financial endowment (fonds de dotation). The previous reform was the Aillagon Law of 2003, which allows 60% tax deductibility for corporate sponsorship donations, or even 90% in the case of support for the acquisition of a "national treasure." The number of foundations has grown significantly: from five foundations created in 2003 under the auspices of the Fondation de France, the total rose to 24 in 2005, 77 in 2006, and 828 funds and foundations in 2016. However, only a portion of these operate in the field of artistic patronage, and they remain relatively small on a global scale, according to Yves Sabouret, president of the Fondation de France. Furthermore, the TEPA Law increased the deductibility from the wealth tax (ISF) for donations made to foundations recognized as being of public utility.

For companies, sponsorship offers a 60% tax reduction, capped at 0.5% of turnover. However, any excess can be carried forward to the following five financial years. There are also specific rules regarding the valuation of different types of sponsorship (skills-based, in kind, in return for benefits), as defined by the General Tax Code.

Corporate sponsorship in France, results of the ADMICAL–CSA study (May 2016)

- The percentage of companies involved in corporate sponsorship in France is 14% of companies with more than one employee, or approximately 170,000 companies.
- The total budget for corporate sponsorship is €3.5 billion.
- Chosen by 24% of companies, the culture budget accounts for 15% of the total budget.
- Companies favor sports (48%), social causes (26%), and culture (24%).
- The three areas receiving the most financial support are social causes (17%), culture (15%), and education (14%).
- Donations are mainly divided between financial sponsorship (80%), sponsorship in kind (8%) and skills-based sponsorship (12%).

Different forms

1. Financial sponsorship (grants, cash contributions, etc.)
2. Sponsorship in kind (goods, merchandise, services, etc.)
3. Skills sponsorship (free provision of personnel, services provided by the company in its professional field)
4. Media partnership sponsorship (a media outlet provides advertising space free of charge or at a reduced rate)
5. Joint sponsorship (or cross-sponsorship – this is an initiative that acts in two areas at once. For example, art and solidarity. The Swiss Life Foundation has partnered with an Alzheimer's disease association to provide guided tours of the Pompidou Museum for people with the disease).

== Examples ==
From 2001 to 2004, Total financed the restoration of the Apollo Gallery at the Louvre, contributing €4.5 million to a total budget of €5.2 million. In August 2008, the museum's former president and director, Henri Loyrette, stated that 57% of the Louvre's revenue came from public subsidies and 43% from its own resources (ticket sales, sponsorship, and private donations). Temporary exhibitions at the Louvre are largely financed by companies: in 2004, the exhibition dedicated to the master of the Fontainebleau School, Primaticcio, received financial support from Morgan Stanley. Furthermore, the Louvre's website is supported by Accenture and LCL.

On the occasion of the signing of the Louvre Atlanta agreement, several American patrons provided funds to renovate the galleries of 18th-century decorative arts at the Louvre Museum.

The Japanese company Nippon Television Network covered the cost of the work (€4.81 million) on the room containing the Mona Lisa.

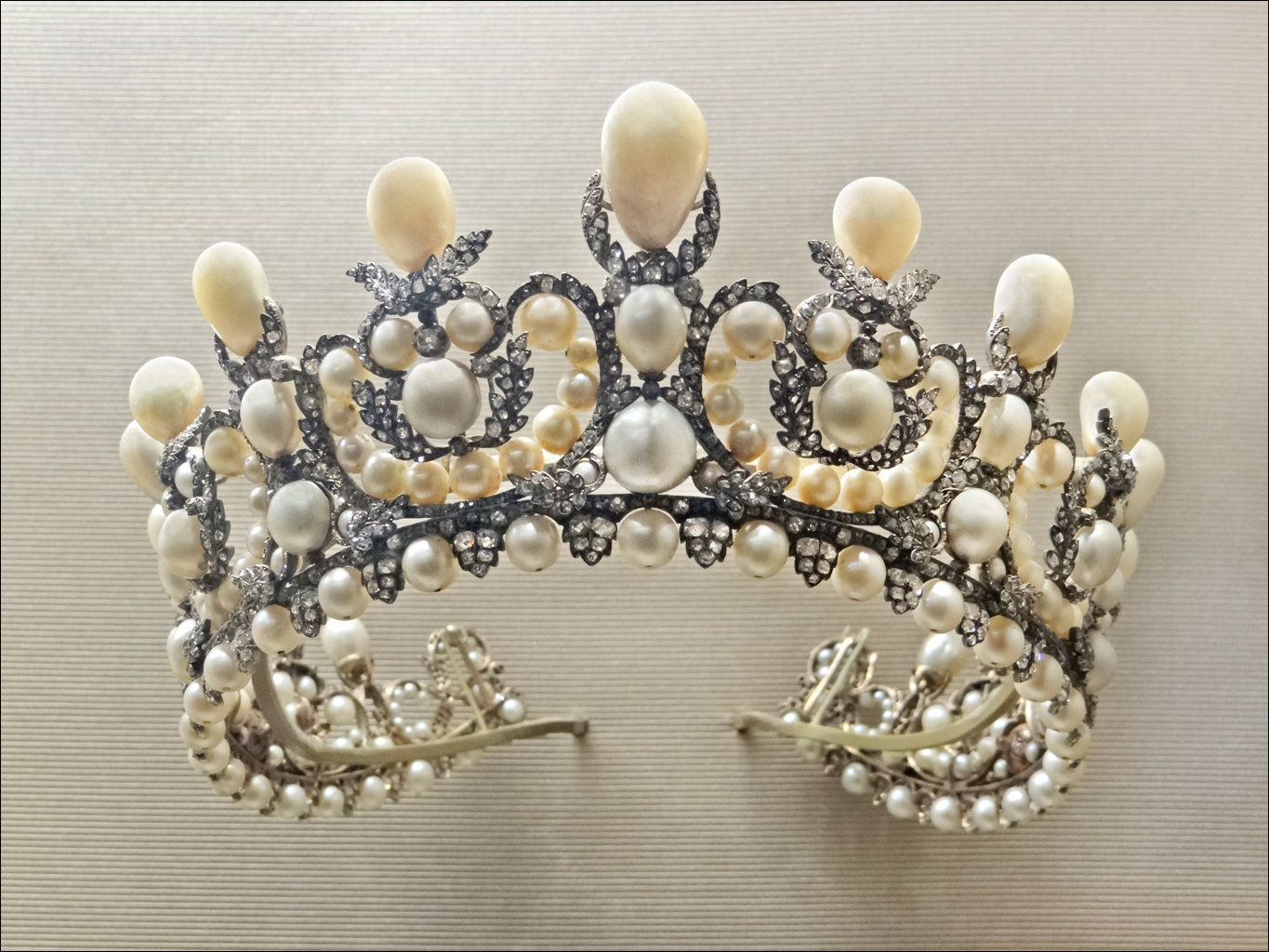
Tiara of Empress Eugénie, by Alexandre-Gabriel Lemonnier (1853).

With the help of the Society of Friends of the Louvre, the Louvre Museum has been working for several years to try to reunite the French Crown Jewels since the sale by the State of the Crown Jewels from 12 to 23 May 1887, and they are now on display there, in particular:

- In 1992, the diadem of Eugénie de Montijo, Empress of the French, was purchased. Made in 1853 by the official crown jeweler Alexandre-Gabriel Lemonnier, the diadem is composed of silver covered with gold, 212 Oriental pearls, and 1,998 diamonds. It had previously belonged to Johannes, 11th Prince of Thurn and Taxis, who inherited an important artistic estate and had acquired the piece for 78,100 francs at the 1887 sale of the French Crown Jewels. The jewel was purchased at public auction for the museum by the Société des Amis du Louvre.
- In 2001, the gold and Roman mosaic parure made in 1810 for Marie Louise, Duchess of Parma, wife of Napoleon I, was acquired. It had been created by the jeweler François-Régnault Nitot, jeweler to the emperor, and had originally been bought for 6,200 francs at the 1887 sale. The piece was again purchased for the Louvre by the Société des Amis du Louvre at public auction.
- In 2004, a set consisting of a necklace and earrings—originally part of a parure offered by Napoleon I to Marie Louise, Duchess of Parma at their marriage in 1810—was repurchased. The necklace contains 32 emeralds and 1,138 diamonds mounted in gold and silver, while the earrings contain 6 emeralds and 108 diamonds. The jewels had been created by the court jewelers Christophe-Frédéric Bapst and Jacques-Evrard Bapst. The acquisition was made possible through contributions from the Heritage Fund and the Société des Amis du Louvre, for a total of €3.7 million.
- In 2008, the large diamond corsage bow, created in 1855 by the Parisian jeweler François Kramer (the Empress's personal jeweler), was also purchased. Purchased at the 1887 Crown Jewels sale by the jeweler Émile Schlesinger, the jewel had remained in the Astor family for more than a century. The return of the large diamond corsage bow to France was made possible by the Société des Amis du Louvre, thanks to an exceptional contribution of €5 million from the estates of Dr. Michel Rouffet and his wife. After an initial auction was cancelled by a court decision, the purchase was ultimately concluded through an over-the-counter negotiation with the seller, based on an estimated value of €6.72 million.

In 2006, the company General Electric partnered with the Eurockéennes de Belfort to bring together the band Dionysos and musicians from the École nationale de musique et de danse de Belfort. This collaboration was part of a European musical creation project involving the Nuits Botanique in Brussels, the Spot Festival in Aarhus, the Eurockéennes de Belfort, and the Festival Internacional de Benicàssim, with support from the Culture 2000. The project aimed to bring together a contemporary music group from each country with a classical orchestra. For the French contribution, the festival selected Dionysos. Together with the Synfonietta ensemble, made up of 50 students, the band re-orchestrated several of its songs under the direction of Jean-Jacques Griesser, director of the Belfort music school. For the first time in the festival's history, the main stage hosted an original creation featuring a French band and young classical musicians from Belfort. The performance was also presented the same year at the Zénith de Paris. According to Philippe Pelletier of GE Energy, the project helped the company reach young people in the region while increasing its visibility and dynamism.

At the Palace of Versailles, the Vinci company is financing the restoration of the Hall of Mirrors, which was completed in 2007. The total cost of the project is €12 million (see Patronage at the Palace of Versailles). International patronage also plays an important role, with two American foundations, The American Friends of Versailles and The Versailles Foundation, are enabling projects such as the restoration of the Bosquet des Trois Fontaines in 2006 and the current restoration of the Fresh pavilion in the gardens of the Petit Trianon. Founded earlier, The Versailles Foundation had already helped refurnish the palace and the Trianons in the 1970s. In 2008, this foundation spearheaded a project to restore and protect the statues in the park, particularly those in the Apollo Baths Grove. The Society of Friends of Versailles also plays an active role in implementing these projects and fostering relationships between the various French and international foundations and companies.

The Swiss watch brand Breguet financed restoration work at the Petit Trianon between 2007 and 2008 to the tune of €5.3 million. The project allowed the upper floors of the Petit Trianon to be opened to the public and included the creation of an audiovisual room offering a virtual tour of the palace.

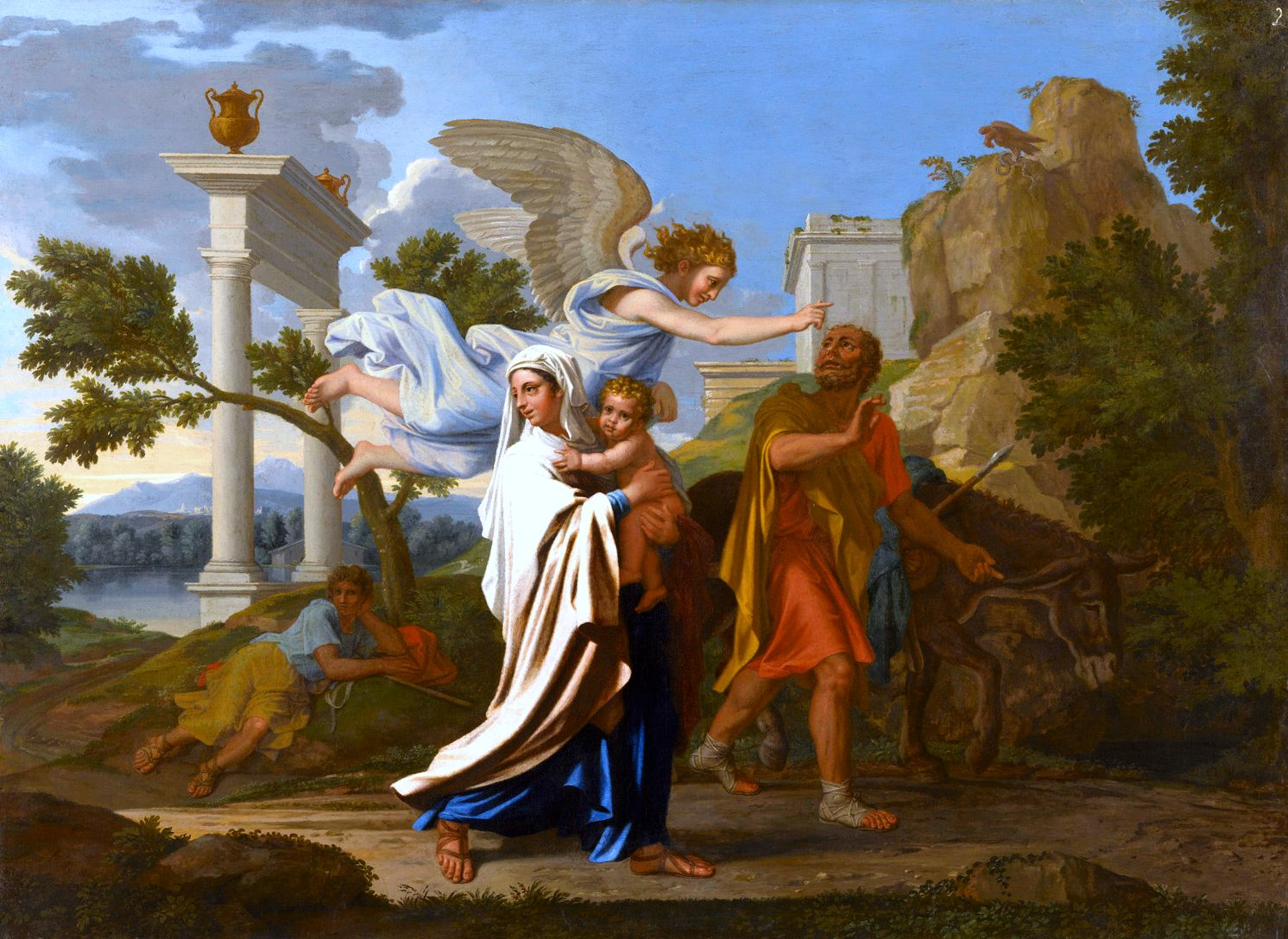
The Flight into Egypt by Nicolas Poussin. Acquired for €17 million in 2008 for the Museum of Fine Arts of Lyon thanks to a patronage initiative.

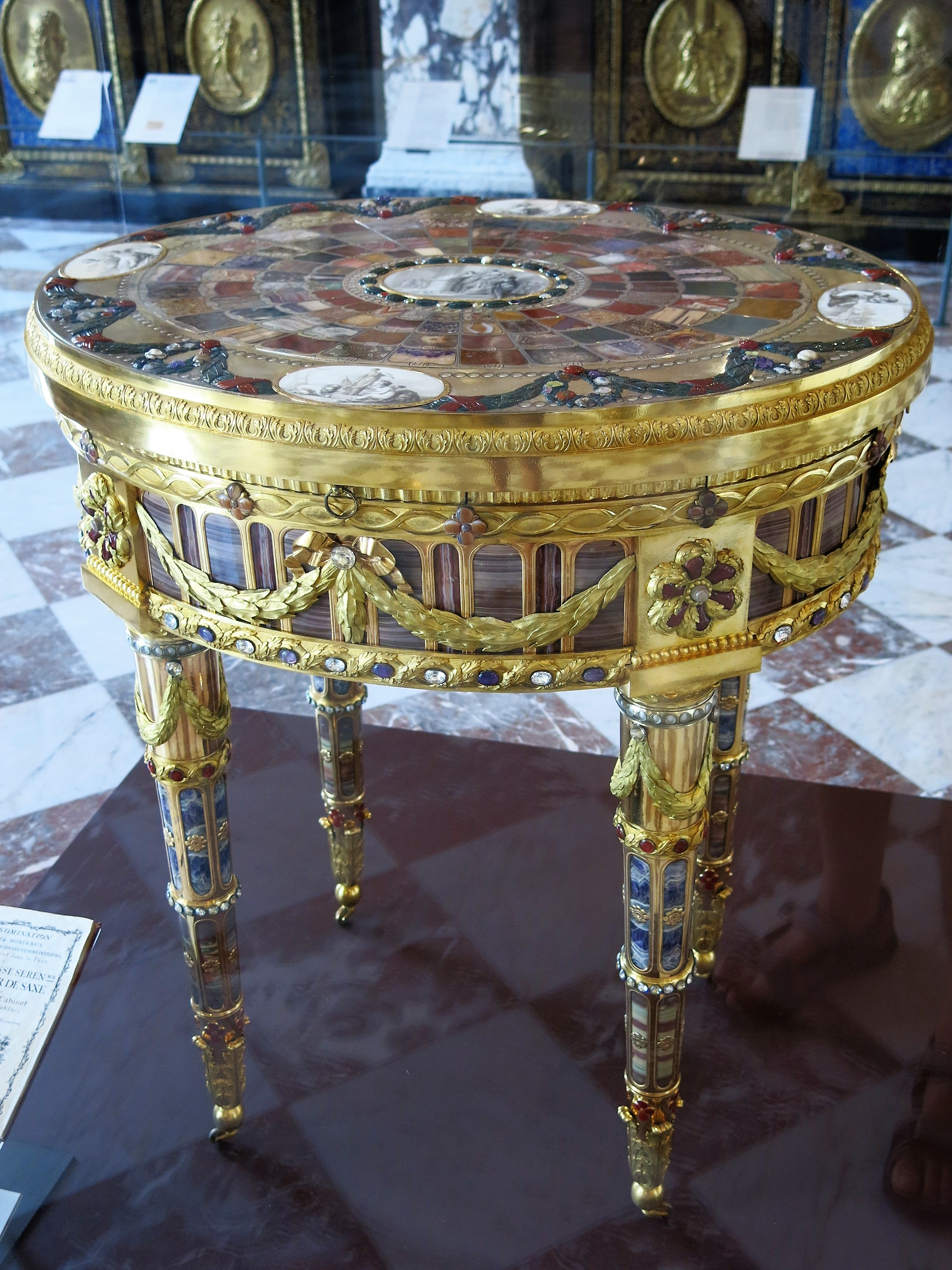
Teschen Table (1779), by Johann Christian Neuber.

The Flight into Egypt, by Nicolas Poussin, was purchased by the Musée des Beaux-Arts in Lyon in 2008, thanks to financial assistance from 18 patrons, for a total price of €17 million.

In May 2009, the dais of Charles VII of France, or more precisely a backrest, was acquired by the Louvre Museum for a total of €5.6 million and joined the Department of Decorative Arts. Thanks to the patronage of the Société des Amis du Louvre, which contributed €2.8 million (with additional funding from the Heritage Fund and the Louvre's own resources). The object, classified as a "national treasure", is considered a major work for both the Louvre and the history of French art. Its existence was unknown until September 2008.

On 18 February 2010, thanks to sponsorship from a financial company, the National Library of France acquired the original manuscript of Giacomo Casanova's Histoire de ma vie for €7 million from a member of the family of German publisher Friedrich Arnold Brockhaus.

In January 2015, thanks to sponsorship from companies and private donors (the "Tous Mécènes !" campaign ") and the participation of the Société des amis du Louvre, the Teschen table (or Breteuil table) for €12.5 million. This unique masterpiece of goldsmith’s furniture was created in 1779 by Johann Christian Neuber, jeweler to the court of Dresden.

In the 2010s, individual patronage remains very marginal in France compared to Anglo-Saxon countries. The Musée d'Art Moderne de la Ville de Paris is the first modern art museum to agree to rename one of its permanent exhibition rooms after the father of one of its patrons, Maurice A. Amon.

In 2018, the LVMH Group financed 80% of the $10 million acquisition of François I's Book of Hours. The remainder was obtained from private donors as part of a new initiative called Tous mécènes (All Patrons).

== Motivations ==
Sponsorship is not usually a gift without something in return. The sponsor expects a benefit in terms of image and recognition. Mario d'Angelo uses the concept of "return on image investment" (ROIm), drawing a parallel with ROI (Return on Investment), which refers to the motivation of the financial investor.

Patronage helps shape the image of the patron—often a company or brand—by supporting selected artists or artistic fields.

This aspect forces companies to maintain a certain degree of rigor so as not to be accused of confusing patronage with sponsor. However, this does not prevent patronage from also supporting creative endeavors and not just recognized artists: according to Guy de Brébisson, support for creative endeavors is as widespread as support for promoting well-known artists. However, he believes that banks and insurance companies favor the latter to reach a wider audience. An example of support for artistic creation is the HSBC Foundation for Photography, created in 1995 by HSBC. Each year it organizes a competition to promote two photographers, publishing a monograph on each with Actes Sud and building its own photography collection.

Tax considerations also play an important role in patronage, thanks to the total or partial deductibility of the amounts committed to these operations. Consequently, patronage is theoretically more attractive to the wealthiest companies, as they are the ones for whom patronage costs the least. Françoise Benhamou notes that when Ronald Reagan reduced the corporate tax rate in the United States in 1986, companies reduced their donations.

Companies engage in patronage for several main reasons:

- To build or strengthen the company's identity and adopt an original communication strategy
- To contribute to the attractiveness of a region or territory
- Due to the personal interests of the company's leadership or the history of the company
- To expose employees to art, encourage creativity, or improve their working environment
- To meet peers and develop or maintain business relationships

To achieve this, the most commonly used types of sponsorship are:

- Financial sponsorship (the company donates a sum of money for an exhibition, a workshop, the acquisition of a work of art, or the restoration of art objects)
- Sponsorship in kind
- Skills sponsorship

== Patronage and the cultural economy ==
The narrow concept of patronage refers to companies' desire to behave in a socially responsible manner. Although this responsibility may also involve considerations of communication, corporate image, and tax benefits, significant corporate patronage nonetheless reflects a healthy relationship between the economic sector and the worlds of art, heritage, and creative production.

However, in most countries corporate patronage remains a relatively minor source of funding for the cultural sector. Even in the United States, it represents no more than about 2.5% of the sector's total resources. Individual support is generally more significant. Donations, gifts, and bequests from private individuals often contribute more to cultural funding than corporate sponsorship. The countries where both corporate and individual patronage are strongest also tend to have a large number of privately managed, non-profit cultural and heritage institutions operating independently from public authorities, according to a European study published in 2018. This study identifies two types of organizations that most clearly reflect this model: "contracted" institutions and "independent" institutions. Their development depends on a favorable national context, including tax provisions recognizing public utility and a willingness by public authorities to avoid intervening in artistic content and programming choices. Such governance models can be found in sectors including music, theater, museums, and historic monuments.

According to the 2012 report "Corporate Sponsorship in France" by Admical and CSA Research, nearly half of companies acting as patrons in the cultural sector also engage in sponsorship. For companies, these two approaches are complementary: they strengthen their influence both through acts of "charity" and through partnerships where their logo and brand are prominently displayed.

In general, local sponsorship is favored, with local impact in 83% of cases for greater visibility. Investments in exhibitions and museums (19%) rank second behind music (39%).

Furthermore, companies are more involved in the dissemination and circulation of culture than in creation, for example. Indeed, this would be a heavier and less visible investment. Moreover, it is more easily linked to the idea of solidarity. Still with profitability in mind, companies tend to associate themselves with so-called "blockbuster" exhibitions such as Picasso and the Masters (Grand Palais in 2008) and Claude Monet (Grand Palais in 2010). These exhibitions typically feature broad public appeal, significant financial resources, a renowned curator, and a theme that has been little explored for many years.The exhibition on Pablo Picasso generated around €1 million, and there had not been a major exhibition devoted to Claude Monet for nearly 60 years.

Investing in art can therefore be seen as an original way to place capital in a prestigious asset, while also representing a strategic investment in an asset that is generally less exposed to the volatility of economic fluctuations

However, financial support from large corporations in artistic circles, often intended to enhance their public image, is increasingly criticized and sometimes described as "art washing" (the use of art to improve or "clean" a company's reputation). Today, patrons are expected to demonstrate consistency with the causes they support; simply funding an exhibition or a museum is no longer considered sufficient. Cultural institutions are now more willing to refuse donations when accepting them could harm their own reputation

== Lists of institutions and foundations ==
=== French institutions and foundations ===
- Fondation de France
- Fondation du patrimoine
- Fondation Chirac

=== International institutions and foundations ===
- Ford Foundation
- Open Society Foundations
- Bill & Melinda Gates Foundation
- Rockefeller Foundation

== See also ==
- Cultural economics
- Patron
- Corporate social responsibility
- Sponsorship
- Foundation (nonprofit)
