= European Sculpture Park Pabianice =

Coordinates: 51.660444°N 19.360611°E

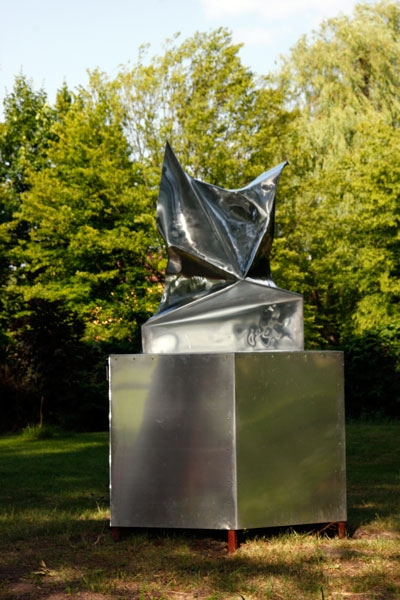
Metal sculpture New Energy (2015) by Jimmy Dahlberg at European Sculpture Park Pabianice

The European Sculpture Park (Polish Europeanski Park Rzeźby) in Pabianice is a public sculpture garden set up by private art patrons in the Łódź Voivodeship – near the geographical center of Poland. The park is closely connected to the A&A Holding. Therefore, it is also referred to as A&A Sculpture Park.

== Location ==
The park is public and freely accessible. It is located in the center of Pabianice, southwest of Łódź. The distance from the city center of Łódź is about 14 kilometers. The sculpture garden is part of a green area on the Dobrzynka river, which also includes a golf course. At the site of the sculpture garden, the river is widened to two lakes.

== History ==
The European Sculpture Park is a privately funded project of the patrons Anna and Arkadiusz Majsterek. They decided to finance a sculpture garden for contemporary sculpture in their hometown of Pabianice. In May 2011 the first sculpture exhibition took place. The first artworks for the park emerged from the 2011 sculptor symposium. In the following years, more works of art were gradually purchased and placed in the park. Currently (2026) there are 18 objects shown in the park. According to the name of the park, the works of art come from different parts of Europe (Poland, Moldova, Italy, Sweden, Ukraine), but also from the Americas (USA, Mexico, Peru).

== Displayed Artworks ==
- Hugo Arquimedes (Mexico): Rattlesnake Column
- Alfonso Narvaez (Mexico): I Am a Free Man
- Ion Zderciuc (Moldova): Sitting Woman and Snake
- Elżbieta Olszewska (Sweden): Fortuna
- Georgij Labunin (Italy): Adam and Eve and Flora
- Zdzisław Liszewski (Poland): Victoria
- Miguel Angel Velit (Peru): Mathematical Sculpture
- Joni Younkins-Herzog (USA): Talking Tubes
- Craig Usher (USA): Wave
- Tomasz Koclęga (Poland): Cuddled Up and Inseparability
- Yuri Makowlev (Ukraine): Majdan
- Jimmy Dahlberg (Sweden): New Energy
- Gennadij Pisarev (Ukraine): Aggression
- Nicola Losego (Italy): Woman
- Aleksander Dynarek (Ukraine): Holly

== Image Gallery ==
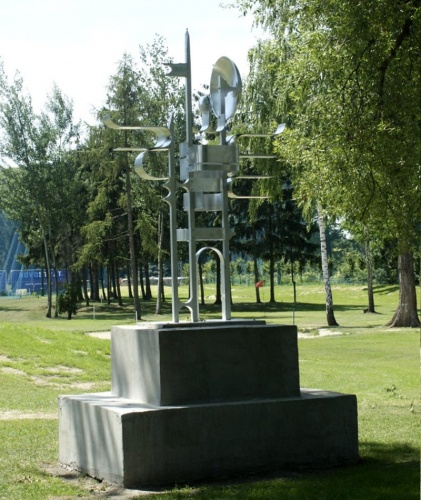
Zdzisław Liszewski: Victoria

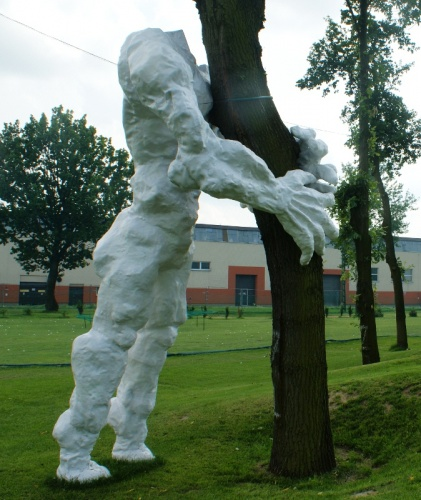
Tomasz Koclęga: Cuddled Up (Wtulony)

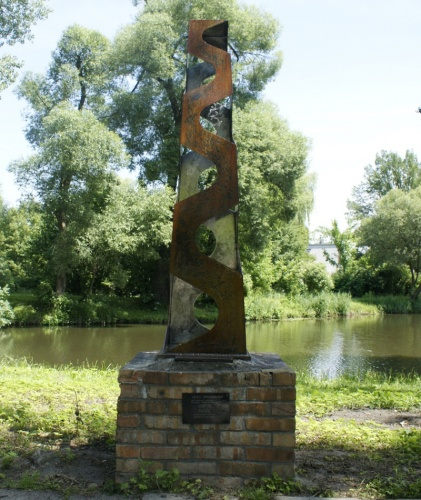
Hugo Arquimedes: Rattlesnake Column (Kolumna grzechotnika)

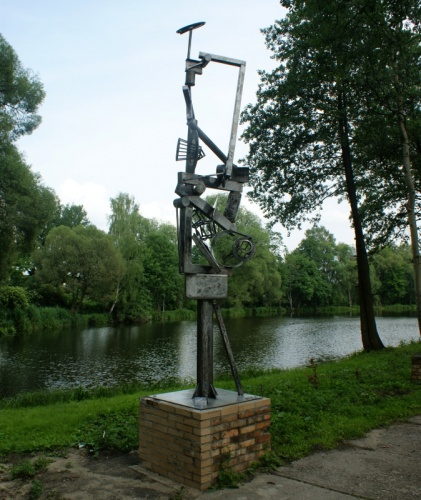
Miguel Angel Velit: Mathematical Sculpture (Matematyczna rzeźba)

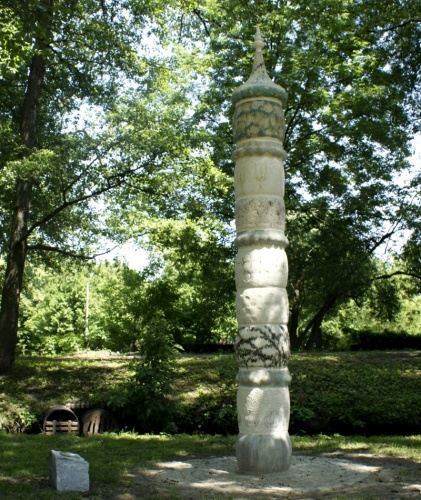
Elżbieta Olszewska: Fortuna

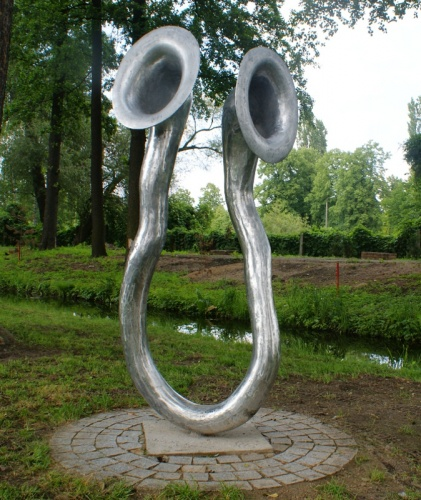
Joni Younkins-Herzog: Talking Tubes (Gadające Tuby)
