= Jeanette Zwingenberger =

- Born: 1962 (age 63–64); Memmingen, West Germany

Jeanette Zwingenberger (born 1962 in Memmingen) is a Paris-based independent art curator and art historical scholar. She is a member of the International Association of Art Critics and a UNESCO member of the Advisory Committee on Works of Art (ACWA) and teaches at the Pantheon-Sorbonne University. Originally a scholar of Renaissance Art, Dr. Zwingenberger generally specializes in contemporary art and is author of more than thirty books and exhibition catalogues, on it. She writes on art for Kunstmagazin, art press, L’œil and L'Observatoire de l'art contemporain. Zwingenberger has organized art exhibitions and interdisciplinary art programs on the topics of visual perception, hidden images, visual language, environments and cannibalism.

== Selected scholarly and curatorial achievements ==
Overall, Zwingenberger has published 41 works in 84 publications in 3 languages and 1,075 library holdings.

Zwingenberger works with several private and public institutions including the Deutsches Museum (Munich), the Palais de Beaux-Arts (Lille), the Galeries nationales du Grand Palais (Paris), the Pavillon de l'Arsenal (Paris), the Fondation Hippocrène (Paris), La Maison Rouge (Paris), me Collectors Room Berlin, Berlin Stiftung Genshagen, Kunsthalle Dominikanerkirche (Osnabrück), 54th Biennale di Venezia (Venice), Moscow Museum of Modern Art, Artfactory (Istanbul), Galerie Priska Pasquer (Cologne), the Antarctic Biennale, The Foundation Agustín Fernández and curated by_vienna 2015.

Her book on Hans Holbein the Younger, The Shadow of Death in the Work of Hans Holbein the Younger (1999) is recommended for scholarly audiences by the Library Journal. She has also authored in 2019, Leonardo da Vinci, L’énigme des images published by In Fine Editions d’art in Paris.

Zwingenberger's exhibition L'Homme-Paysage at the Palais des Beaux-Arts de Lille (2006–07) presented an innovative display of works combining human figures with a landscape or environmental setting, reflecting the practice of 15th-century Renaissance artists, but also including more recent creations.

== Education ==
- 1998 Ph.D in Art History and Philosophy, University of Fribourg, Switzerland
- 1989 Master's degree, University Paris IV, Sorbonne, France
- 1988 Bachelor in Art History and Archaeology, University Paris IV, Sorbonne, France
- 1982-84 Literature, Philosophy, and Art History, Johannes Gutenberg University, Mainz, Germany

== Selected curated exhibitions ==
- 2021-2022: L'Afrique(s) vue par ses photographes: de Malick Sidibé à nos jours. Musée Mohammed VI d'Art Moderne et Contemporain, Rabat, Maroc.
- Abel's Eye, Jeanette Zwingenberger, Cat. Exp. Metamorfoses da Humanidade de Graça Morais, Museu Nacional de Arte Contemporânea – Museu do Chiado, 22.3.-2.6.2019, Lisboa.
- All Cannibals, La Maison Rouge, Fondation Antoine de Galbert, Paris, 11 February – 15 May 2011. Me Collectors Room, Thomas Olbricht, Berlin, 27.5-11.9. 2011. art press editions
- Frida Kahlo’s, Human landscape », in Frida Kahlo, Retrospective, 30 April – 9 August 2010, Martin Gropius-Bau and Kunstforum Wien, 1 September – 5 December 2010. Ed. Prestel
- Une image peut en cacher une autre: Arcimboldo, Dalí, Raetz, RMN, Paris, 2009
- IMAGES CACHEES (Hidden Images) n°13, April 2009. Art press
- L’Homme-Paysage, Visions artistiques du paysage anthropomorphe entre le XVIe et le XXIe siècle, (Human-Landscape. Artistic visions of anthropomorphic landscapes) Lille, ed. Somogy Éditions d'art, 2006, Paris
