= Psilophyllites =

Psilophyllites Temporal range: 201.6–196.5 Ma

Scientific classification
- Kingdom: Animalia
- Phylum: Mollusca
- Class: Cephalopoda
- Subclass: †Ammonoidea
- Order: †Ammonitida
- Family: †Psiloceratidae
- Genus: †Psilophyllites; Spath, 1914

Species
- Psilophyllites hagenowii

Genus of molluscs (fossil)

Psilophyllites is an extinct genus of cephalopod belonging to the ammonite subclass.
