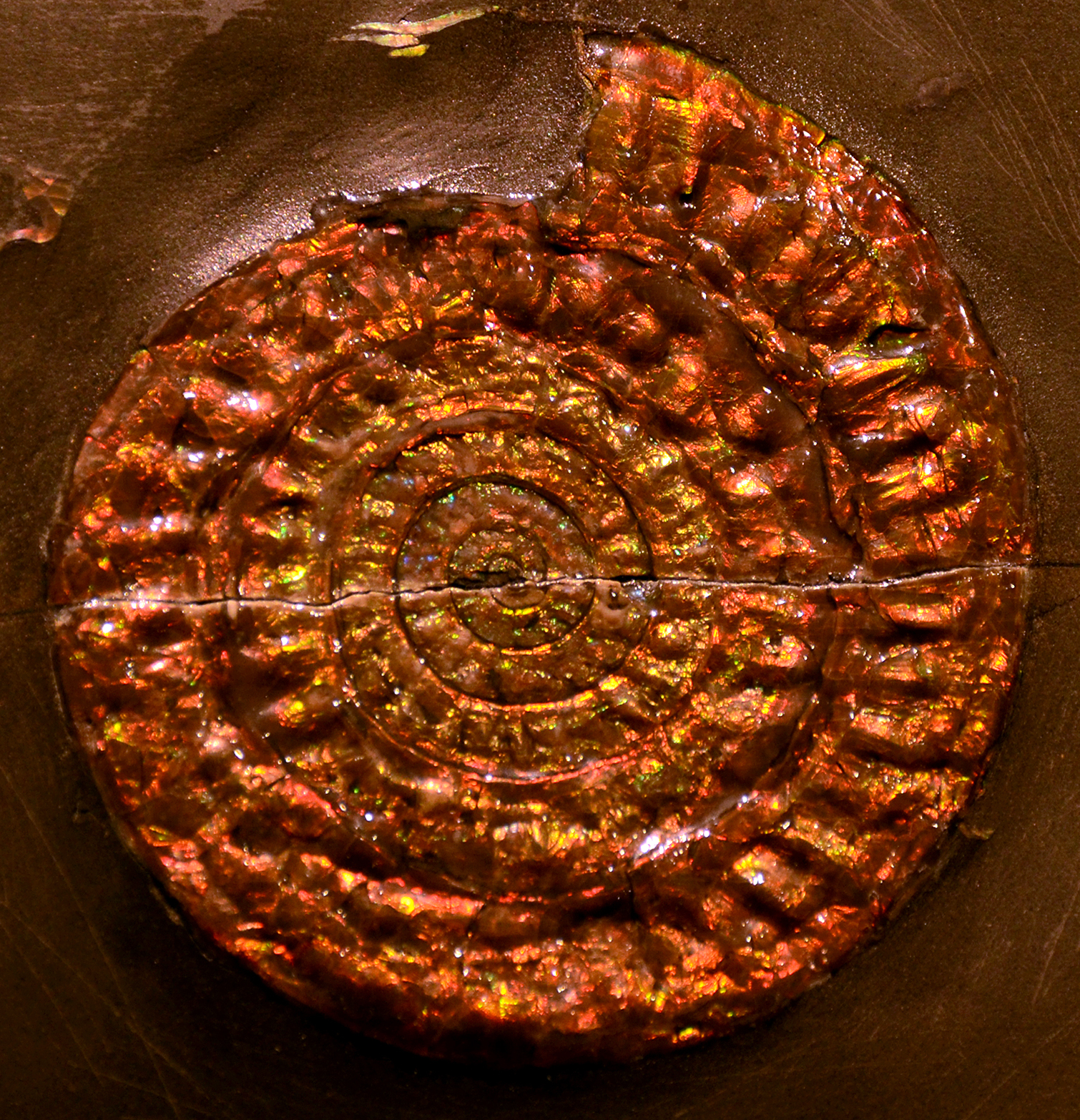
- Caloceras johnstoni displaying ammolite iridescence, Jurassic, Musée des Confluences

Scientific classification
- Kingdom: Animalia
- Phylum: Mollusca
- Class: Cephalopoda
- Subclass: †Ammonoidea
- Order: †Ammonitida
- Family: †Psiloceratidae
- Genus: †Caloceras; Hyatt, 1871

Species
- None cataloged

= Caloceras =

Caloceras Temporal range: Hettangian

Genus of molluscs (fossil)

Caloceras is an extinct genus of cephalopod belonging to the ammonite subclass.

== Distribution ==
Jurassic of Argentina, Austria, Canada, the United Kingdom
