= Kammerkaroceras =

Kammerkaroceras Temporal range: Hettangian

Scientific classification
- Kingdom: Animalia
- Phylum: Mollusca
- Class: Cephalopoda
- Subclass: †Ammonoidea
- Order: †Ammonitida
- Family: †Psiloceratidae
- Genus: †Kammerkaroceras; Lange, 1941

Genus of molluscs (fossil)

Kammerkaroceras is an extinct cephalopod genus from the Lower Jurassic belonging to the ammonoid family Psiloceratidae.

The shell of Kammerkaroceras is involute, all whorls except for the outermost hidden from view, discoidal with sigmoidal ribs that branch on the sides and cross over the rounded venter.
