= Antoine de Galbert =

French artist

- Born: October 20, 1955 (age 70); Grenoble
- Occupations: Collector and Patron of the Arts
- Parent(s): Maurice de Galbert (father), Charles Defforey (adoptive father)
- Website: fondationantoinedegalbert.org

Antoine de Galbert-Defforey, born October 20, 1955 in Grenoble, is a French collector of contemporary art and patron of the arts.

He is primarily known for being the creator of the Antoine de Galbert Foundation, a not-for-profit public utility foundation in France, whose mission is to promote different forms of modern and contemporary art through temporary exhibitions, and through his exhibition hall, La Maison Rouge.

On October 28, 2018, the establishment closed its doors for good, but the Antoine de Galbert Foundation continues to support the arts.

== Biography ==
Great-grandson of an industrialist from the Isère department of France and orphaned at three years old, Antoine de Galbert-Defforey was adopted by his step-father, Charles Defforey. In addition to taking the Defforey name, Antoine inherited Charles Defforey's fortune.

A graduate of the Institut d'études politiques de Grenoble (Grenoble Institute of Political Studies) in 1979 and heir to the Carrefour group, he became the financial controller of supermarkets in 1980 before opening an art gallery in Grenoble in 1987. Over time he formed a collection, and after this gallery closed, he dreamed of organizing a not-for-profit foundation – the Antoine de Galbert Foundation – in order to maintain his engagement with contemporary art. In 2001, he acquired a derelict industrial area of 2,500 square metres (0.62 acres) on the Boulevard de la Bastille in Paris and filed for public utility status. In 2004, he opened La Maison Rouge, the foundation's exhibition hall, with the mission of promoting different forms of modern and contemporary art through temporary exhibits.

Anxious about the financial explosion of contemporary art ("The art world is a huge melting pot where passionate and honest people rub shoulders with dangerous hucksters"), he does not consider himself an investor-collector and asserts that the human side of his foundation is almost more important than what is exhibited there.

In April 2018, he announced that he was donating his collection of 500 ethnic headdresses from hunters, warriors, shamans, and witch doctors to the Musée des Confluences in Lyon

On October 28, 2018, Antoine de Galbert announced the final closure of La Maison Rouge after having proved in 2017 that an eventual end of the adventure was inevitable, while the public utility foundation continues to support the arts by assisting, promoting and defending creation in the field of modern and contemporary art. The foundation's mission is to support art history education and the training of future artists. It also acquires works for the purposes of enriching the collections of certain museums. It funds grants for research, residencies or portfolio projects.

== Exhibitions of the collection ==
- Une histoire d'images (A History of Images). 16 December 2023 – 3 March 2024 at the Musée de Grenoble. Thanks to an important donation from the collector, the museum offered an exhibition of 95 photographs (famous or anonymous), representative of the 20th century.
- Traverser la nuit. Œuvres de la collection Antoine de Galbert (Traverse the Night. Works from the Antoine de Galbert collection.) - curator: Noëlig Le Roux. 12 March – 29 August 2022 at the MAAT Museum of Art, Architecture and Technology in Lisbon (Portugal)
- Grand Bazar. Choix de Jean-Hubert Martin dans la collection Antoine de Galbert. (Grand Bazaar. Jean-Hubert Martin's collection in dialogue with the Antoine de Galbert collection.) 26 June – 3 October 2021 at the Château d'Oiron - Centre des Monuments Nationaux
- Burning House. Extraits de la collection Antoine de Galbert. (Burning House. Selection from the Antoine de Galbert collection.) 2 October 2020 – 10 January 2021 at Muzeum Sztuki, Łódź (Pologne)
- Un certain désordre. Extraits de la collection Antoine de Galbert. (Certain disorder. Selection from the Antoine de Galbert collection.) 5 September – 22 November 2020 at the Multimédia Art Museum, Moscou (Russie)
- Day for (your) Night. Collection vidéo d'Antoine de Galbert. (Video collection from Antoine de Galbert.) 29 May – 31 August 2020 (online exhibition) at the SHED centre d'art contemporain in Normandy
- Le monde en tête. La donation de coiffes d'Antoine de Galbert. (The world on its head. Antoine de Galbert's donation of headdresses.) 6 June 2019 – 23 August 2020 at Musée des Confluences, Lyon
- Cabinets de curiosités (Cabinets of curiosities) (among other collections) - curators: Laurent Le Bon and Patrick Mauriès. 23 June – 3 November 2019 at the Fonds Hélène and Édouard Leclerc pour la culture (art center), Landerneau
- Souvenirs de voyage. La collection Antoine de Galbert. (Travel memories. The Antoine de Galbert collection.) 27 April – 28 July 2019 at the Musée de Grenoble
- 100 Portraits. La Collection Antoine de Galbert. (100 Portraits. The Antoine de Galbert collection.) 2 July – 23 September 2018 in the Magasin Électrique (Association du Méjan and Actes Sud publishing house), as part of the Rencontres d'Arles
- Day for night. Collection vidéo d'Antoine de Galbert. (Antoine de Galbert's video collection.) 29 May – 31 July 2016 at the SHED contemporary art center in Normandy, Notre-Dame-de-Bondeville
- Elévations. Hommage des collectionneurs Bruno Decharme et Antoine de Galbert à Joseph Ferdinand Cheval. (Elevations. Tribute to Joseph Ferdinand Cheval by Bruno Decharme and Antoine de Galbert.) 30 April – 30 August 2015 at the Palais Idéal du Facteur Cheval, Hauterives
- Le mur. Œuvres de la collection Antoine de Galbert. (The wall. Works from the Antoine de Galbert collection.) 14 June – 21 September 2014 at La maison rouge, Paris
- Voyage dans ma tête. La collection de coiffes ethniques d'Antoine de Galbert. (Voyage in my head. The ethnic headdress collection of Antoine de Galbert.) 10 March – 17 September 2012 at the Musée dauphinois, Grenoble
- My Paris. Collection Antoine de Galbert. 1 October 2011 – 8 January 2012 at the Collectors Room Berlin
- Ainsi soit-il. Collection Antoine de Galbert – Extraits. (Let it be. Antoine de Galbert Collection - Selections.) 16 septembre 2011 – 2 janvier 2012 au Musée des beaux-arts de Lyon
- Joseph et moi. Antoine de Galbert – Joseph Denais, portrait croisé de collectionneurs. (Joseph and me. Antoine de Galbert – Joseph Denais, combined portrait of collectors.) 9 July – 2 November 2011 at the Musée Joseph Denais, Beaufort-en-Vallée
- Voyage dans ma tête. La collection de coiffes d'Antoine de Galbert. (Voyage in my head. Antoine de Galbert's collection of headdresses.) 12 June – 26 September 2010 at La maison rouge, Paris
- Investigations of a Dog (Les recherches d'un chien, 2009–2011) - Travelling exhibition of the FACE association's (Foundation of Arts for a Contemporary Europe) founder's collections. 22 June – 30 October 2011: Deste Foundation, Athènes. 17 February – 29 May 2011: Magasin III, Stockholm. 23 October 2010 – 16 January 2011: La maison rouge, Paris. 15 May – 5 September 2010: Ellipse Foundation, Cascais. 21 October 2009 – 7 February 2010: Fondation Sandretto Re Rebaudengo, Turin
- Je collectionne. (I collect.) 16 May – 13 September 2009 at the Espace Ducros, Grignan
- Mutatis, Mutandis. La collection Antoine de Galbert. (The Antoine de Galbert collection.) 18 February – 13 May 2007 at La maison rouge, Paris

== Other roles ==
- Administrator of the Ecole du Louvre
- Administrator of the Ecole Nationale Supérieure des Beaux-Arts de Paris
- Administrator of the Musée International des Arts Modestes in Sète

== Awards ==
=== Decorations ===
- Officer of the Ordre des Arts et des Lettres (Order of Arts and Letters). He was promoted to the rank of officer by decree on 13 February 2015.
- Knight of the Ordre national du Mérite (National Order of Merit). He was knighted on 15 May 2009 in recognition of his 29 years of professional activity and military service.
- Officer of the Légion d'honneur (Legion of Honour).
- Gold medal from the city of Grenoble
