= Sylvio Perlstein =

Belgian-Brazilian art collector and jeweler (1931–2025)

- Born: 1931; Antwerp, Belgium
- Died: 6 August 2025 (aged 94); Antwerp, Belgium
- Occupation(s): Art collector Jeweler

Sylvio Perlstein (1931 – 6 August 2025) was a Belgian art collector and jeweller.

Perlstein was impassioned with Dadaism, surrealism, minimalism, conceptual art, Nouveau Réalisme, Arte Povera, and photography of the 1920s. He was unknown to the general public prior to a 2007 exposition titled Busy Going Crazy, held at the La Maison Rouge in Paris.

Perlstein was born in Antwerp in 1931. He died there on 6 August 2025, at the age of 94.

== Works ==
- La photographie n'est pas l'art (2009)
