= Laqueoceras =

Laqueoceras Temporal range: Hettangian

Scientific classification
- Kingdom: Animalia
- Phylum: Mollusca
- Class: Cephalopoda
- Subclass: †Ammonoidea
- Order: †Ammonitida
- Family: †Psiloceratidae
- Genus: †Laqueoceras

Genus of molluscs (fossil)

Laqueoceras is an extinct genus of cephalopod belonging to the Ammonite subclass. They were fast-moving nektonic carnivores.
