= La Maison Rouge =

Coordinates: 48.8472°N 2.3678°E

La Maison Rouge was a private contemporary art foundation dedicated mainly to showing private art collections, monographic shows of contemporary artists' work. It was located close to the Bastille, in Paris, at 10 Boulevard de la Bastille in the 12th arrondissement of Paris. La Maison Rouge has been definitely closed in October 2018.

== History ==
Created in 2004 by Contemporary Art Collector Antoine de Galbert, La maison rouge occupied an old factory building. The 2000-square-meter space was renovated by architect Jean-Yves Clément and the artist Jean-Michel Alberola. The Foundation offices were located at the center the building in what used to be an old red farmhouse (hence its name). La maison rouge had an adjacent bookstore run by Bookstorming and a branch of Rose Bakery, an organic English style cafe, that renewed its entire decoration with each exhibition.

== Exhibitions ==
=== 2004 ===
- Central Station - The Harald Falckenberg Collection
- Anthony McCall - Solid Light Films
- L'intime, behind closed doors: the private world of collectors.

=== 2005 ===
- Luc Delahaye, photography
- Tadashi Yamaneko, Shinjuku
- Dieter Appelt, Cinema Prisma
- Arnulf Rainer and his Art Brut Collection.
- Berlinde de Bruyckere, Eén (Un)
- Ann Hamilton, Phora

=== 2006 ===
- Busy Going Crazy, The Sylvio Perlstein Collection, Art & Photography from Dada to our days.
- Sound and Fury, the Works of Henry Darger.
- Michaël Borremans, Paintings and Drawings
- Les livres cuits: Denise A. Aubertin
- Une vision du monde, The video-art collection of Isabelle and Jean-Conrad Lemaître.

=== 2007 ===
- Mutatis, Mutandis
- Tetsumi Kudo, la montagne que nous cherchons est dans la serre
- Patrick Van Caeckenbergh
- Felice Varini
- Pavillon Seroussi
- Sots Art Political Art in Russia from 1972 to today.

=== 2008 ===
- Gregor Schneider, Süsser Duft
- Pilar Albarracin, Mortal cadencia
- Marie Maillard
- Elmar Trenkwalder
- Augustin Lesage
- Andrea Blum

=== 2009 ===
- VRAOUM ! An Exhibition of Comic Strips and Contemporary Art.

=== 2010 ===
- Marco Decorpeliada: Schizomètres
- Céleste Boursier Mougenot
- Face B a project by Daniela Franco.
- Vinyl : Records and Covers by Artists The Guy Schraenen Collection.
- Peter Buggenhout, It's a Strange, Strange World, Sally
- Journey inside my head Antoine de Galbert's collection of ethnic headdresses. (co-curators: Antoine de Galbert and Bérénice Geoffroy-Schneiter)
- Jean de Maximy, Suite inexacte en homologie singulière.
- Investigations of a Dog – Works from Five European Art Foundations, FACE (curated in Paris by : Paula Aisemberg and Noëlig Le Roux).

=== 2011 ===
- All Cannibals (curated by Jeanette Zwingenberger)
- Chiharu Shiota, Home of Memory.
- My Winnipeg, Winnipeg's Contemporary Art Scene.
- Memories of the future, The Olbricht Collection.

=== 2012 ===
- Neon, Who's Afraid of Red, Yellow and Blue? (curated by David Rosenberg)
- Louis Soutter, The Tremor of Modernity
- Didier Vermeiren, Sculptures-Photographies.
- Retour à l'intime, The Giuliana and Tommaso Setari Collection.

=== 2013 ===
- Under the influence, Visual Arts and Psychotropics.
- My Joburg, Johannesburg's Art Scene.
- Theatre of the World, The collections of David Walsh.
