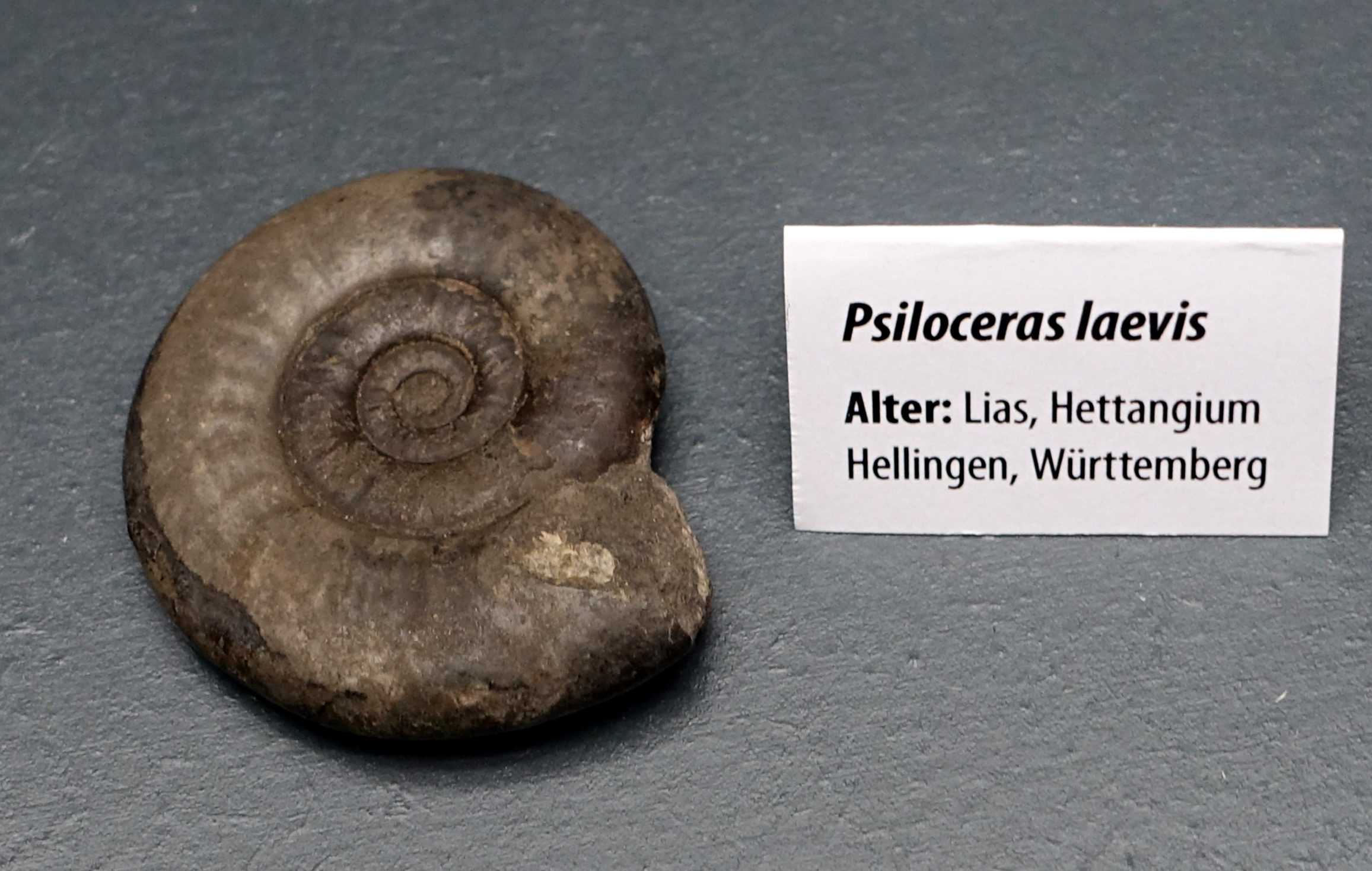
- Psiloceras laevis

Scientific classification
- Kingdom: Animalia
- Phylum: Mollusca
- Class: Cephalopoda
- Subclass: †Ammonoidea
- Order: †Ammonitida
- Family: †Psiloceratidae
- Genus: †Psiloceras; Hyatt, 1867

Species
- P. planorbis (Sowerby, 1824) (type) synonym Ammonites planorbis, A. sampsoni, P. sampsoni; P. becki; P. brevicellatum; P. calliphylloides; P. calliphyllum Neumayr, 1879 synonym Aegoceras calliphyllum; P. costosum; P. distinctum; P. erugatum; P. hagenowi; P. marcouxi Guex, Taylor, Rakus & Bucher, 1998; P. minillaensis von Hillebrandt, 2000; P. naumanni; P. pacificum Guex, 1980; P. polymorphum Guex, 1980; P. plicatulum (Quenstedt, 1883) synonym Ammonites plicatulus; P. primocostatum von Hillebrandt, 2000; P. psilonotum; P. sampsoni; P. spelae Guex, Taylor, Rakus & Bucher, 1998; P. spelae tirolicum von Hillebrandt & Krystyn, 2009; P. tenerum; P. tibeticum Yin et al., 2007; P. tilmanni Lange, 1925

= Psiloceras =

Psiloceras Temporal range: Hettangian

Genus of molluscs (fossil)

Psiloceras is an extinct genus of ammonite. Psiloceras is among the earliest known Jurassic ammonites, and the appearance of the earliest Psiloceras species form the definition for the base of the Jurassic. Unlike most earlier ammonites, which had complex shell shapes and ornamentation, Psiloceras had a smooth shell.

== Taxonomy ==
Almost all ammonites, with the sole exemption of a few members of the family Psiloceratidae, including Psiloceras were wiped out at the Triassic–Jurassic extinction event (201.3 million years ago).

Most authors assume that Psiloceras descended from the Phyllocerataceae. P. spelae is probably the earliest species of Psiloceras.

== Biostratigraphic significance ==
The International Commission on Stratigraphy (ICS) has assigned the First Appearance Datum of the Psiloceras spela-group as the defining biological marker for the start of the Hettangian, 201.3 ± 0.2 million years ago, the earliest stage of the Jurassic, with the Global Boundary Stratotype Section and Point (GSSP) located at Kuhjoch pass, Karwendel Mountains, Northern Calcareous Alps, Austria, which was ratified in 2010. The base of the Jurassic in Britain was historically defined by the first appearance of the ammonite Psiloceras planorbis.

== Distribution ==
Jurassic of Argentina, Austria, Canada, China, France, Germany, New Zealand, Spain, the United Kingdom, United States Psiloceras fossils are commonly found at Watchet, Somerset, England. Here smooth-shelled Psiloceras planorbis (along with other species) are to be found as usually flattened fossils in the Blue Lias.
