= The Flight into Egypt (Poussin) =

Painting by Nicolas Poussin

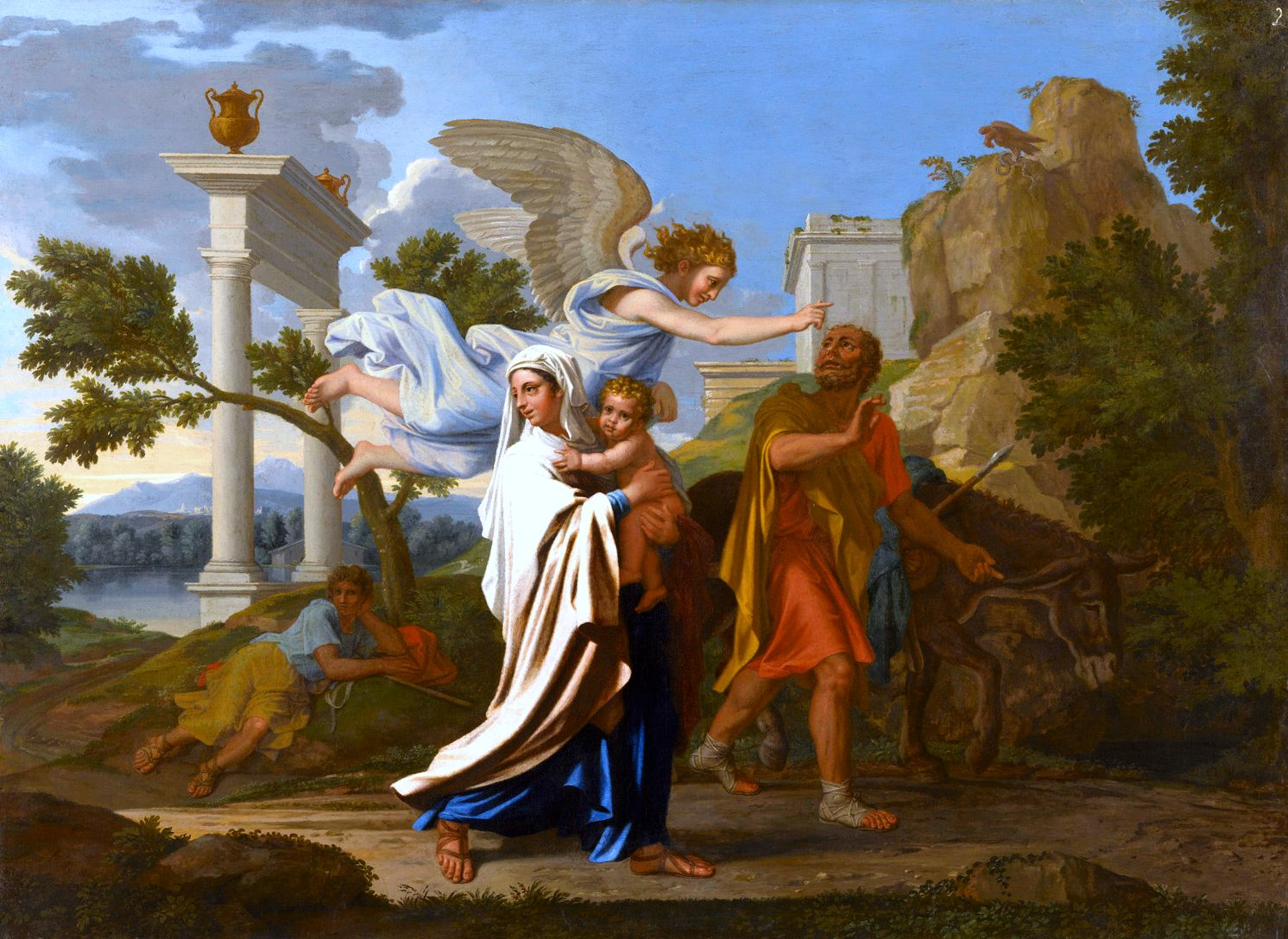
- Artist: Nicolas Poussin
- Year: c. 1657-1658
- Medium: Oil on canvas
- Dimensions: 98 cm × 133 cm (39 in × 52 in)
- Location: Musée des Beaux-Arts de Lyon; Lyon

The Flight into Egypt is an oil-on-canvas painting by the French artist Nicolas Poussin painted in 1657 or 1658. It was originally kept in the Musée du Louvre, then was transferred to the Musée des Beaux-Arts de Lyon.

== History ==
The painting was probably inspired by a painting on the same theme by Italian Baroque painter Annibale Carracci.

This painting appeared in an auction in Versailles in 1986 with 80,000 francs as initial price. It was bought by Richard and Robert Pardo for 1,600,000 francs. Exhibited in the gallery, it was later recognized as an authentic work of the artist. Then there was a lengthy trial whose outcome was unfavorable to Pardo : the final decision was to re-give the painting to the seller. The owner then wanted to sell this work for more than 15 million euros. The Musée des Beaux-Arts de Lyon then began to collect the money to acquire it.

In July 2007, the Louvre and the Musée des Beaux-Arts de Lyon were finally able to raise the funds necessary to purchase the painting. It would one of the most expensive work ever collected by the patronage, with a cost of 17 million euros (1 million provided by the Mayor of Lyon, 250,000 by the Rhône-Alpes region, 1 million by the Musée du Louvre with its own funds, and over 18 patrons such as Gaz de France which gave 3 million euros, TotalEnergies, AXA, businesses and banks of Lyon and a private donor). The work was acquired for the Louvre and was transferred in February 2008 at the Musée des Beaux-Arts de Lyon, the hometown of Jacques Sérisier, who was the first collector of the painting and who was probably its sponsor.

== See also ==
- List of paintings by Nicolas Poussin
