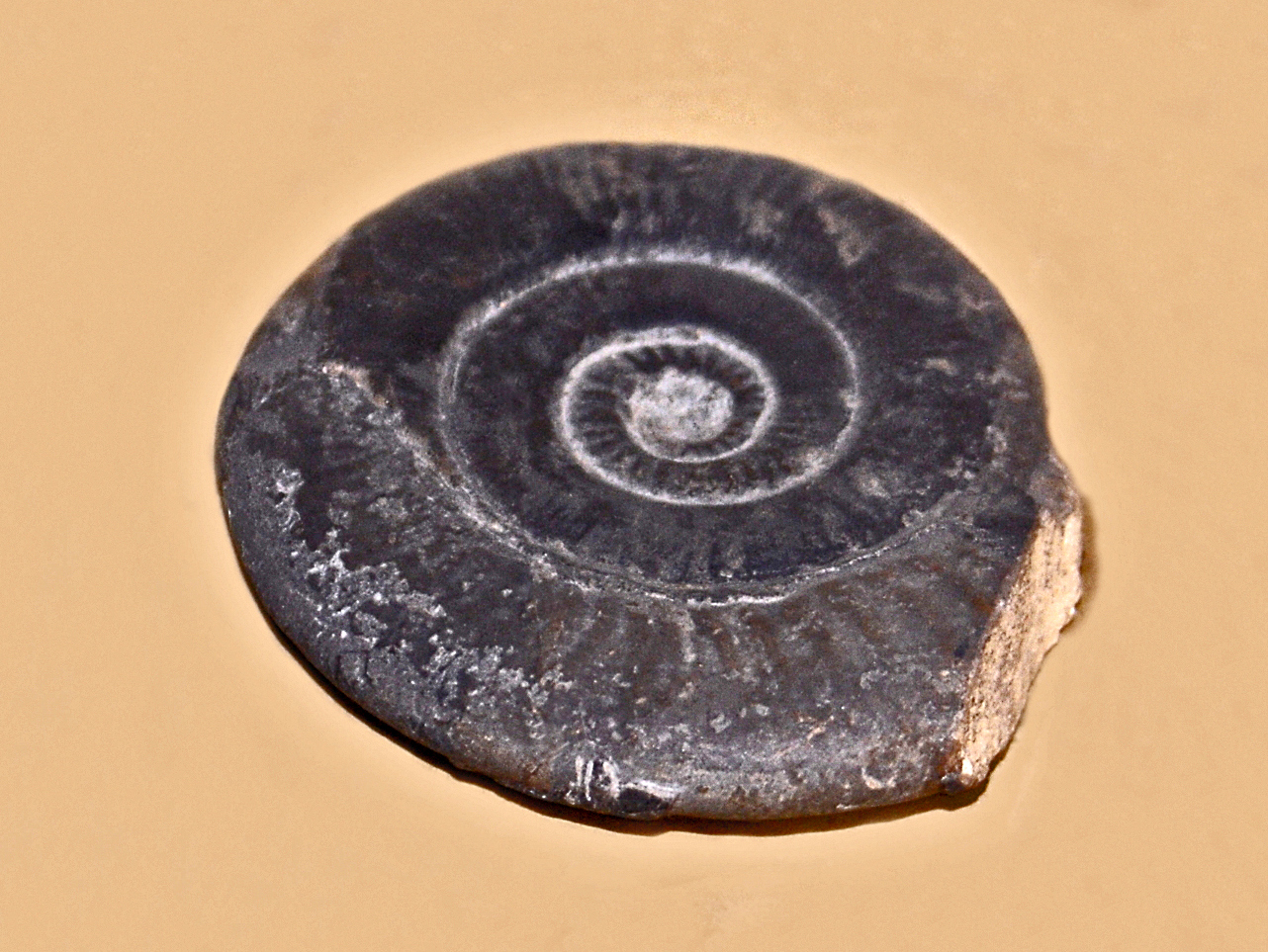
- Fossil shells of Psiloceras planorbis from Germany, on display at Galerie de paléontologie et d'anatomie comparée in Paris

Scientific classification
- Kingdom: Animalia
- Phylum: Mollusca
- Class: Cephalopoda
- Subclass: †Ammonoidea
- Order: †Ammonitida
- Superfamily: †Psiloceratoidea
- Family: †Psiloceratidae; Hyatt, 1867

Synonyms
- Caloceratidae Buckman, 1906

= Psiloceratidae =

Psiloceratidae Temporal range: from Triassic to Cretaceous, 205.6– 66.043 Ma

Extinct family of ammonites

Psiloceratidae is an extinct family of cephalopods belonging to the ammonite subclass.

== Description ==
The Psiloceratidae are evolute, smooth or with blunt primary ribbing. The venter is rounded and generally smooth, in some feebly keeled. Sutures are simple with phylloid saddle endings in some. The aptychus is single, found in sutu in Psiloceras

== Genera ==
- Badouxia Guex and Taylor, 1976
- Caloceras
- Discamphiceras
- Euphyllites Wahner, 1898
- Franziceras Buckman, 1923
- Kammerkaroceras
- Laqueoceras
- Murihikuites Stevens, 2004
- Paradiscamphiceras Taylor, 1988
- Paraphylloceras Salfeld, 1919
- Psiloceras
- Psilophyllites

== Distribution ==
Fossils of species within this genus have been found in the Triassic rocks of Canada, in the Jurassic rocks of Argentina, Austria, Canada, China, France, Germany, Hungary, Mexico, New Zealand, Spain), United Kingdom, United States, as well as in the Cretaceous of Australia and Russia.
