= Musée des Confluences =

Museum in Lyon, France

Coordinates: 45°43′58″N 4°49′06″E

- Musée des Confluences from the Raymond Barre bridge
- Established: 20 December 2014
- Location: Lyon, France
- Collection size: 2,2 millions
- Visitors: 680 583 (2018)
- Director: Hélène Lafont-Couturier
- Architect: Coop Himmelb(l)au
- Website: www.museedesconfluences.fr

The Musée des Confluences

The Musée des Confluences (French pronunciation: [myze de kɔ̃flyɑ̃s]) is a science centre and anthropology museum which opened on 20 December 2014, in the 2nd arrondissement of Lyon (Rhône), France.

In May 2011, the Musée des Confluences, while still under construction, received the designation “Musée de France” from the Ministry of Culture and Communication. It is located at the southern tip of the Presqu'île at the confluence of the Rhône and the Saône, adjacent to Autoroute A7, and comprises part of a larger redevelopment project of the Confluence quarter of Lyon. The deconstructivist architectural design, said to resemble a floating crystal cloud of stainless steel and glass, was created by the Austrian firm Coop Himmelb(l)au.

== History ==
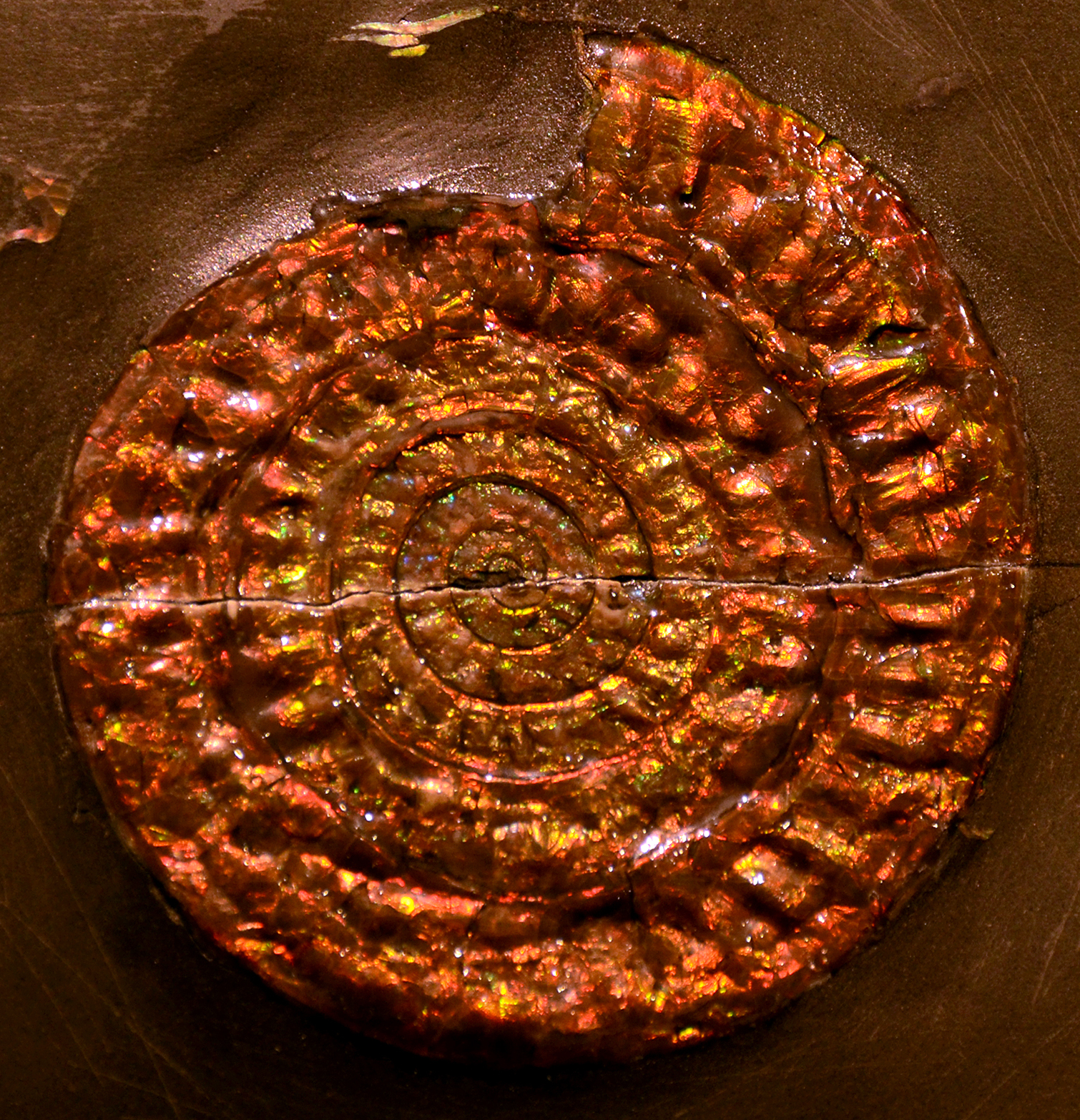
Caloceras ammonite displaying ammolite iridescence, on display at the Musée des Confluences, 2015

The museum includes collections of natural science, anthropology, and Earth Sciences of the Musée d'histoire naturelle — Guimet. These collections will be supplemented by exhibitions of arts and crafts.

The four major exhibitions are called "Origins - Stories of the World", "Species — the Web of life", "Societies — Human theatre," and "Eternities — Visions of the beyond". The first exhibition deals with questions of origin, both the Big Bang theory, history of the universe, as well as the birth of life and evolution of especially humans. The second exhibition, "Species", explores the links between humans and animals, and evolution of different species. The third exhibition, "societies" is about human societies and how humans build communities. And finally, "Eternities" deals with the meaning of life, the inevitable death of humans, and how that question has been dealt with in different societies.

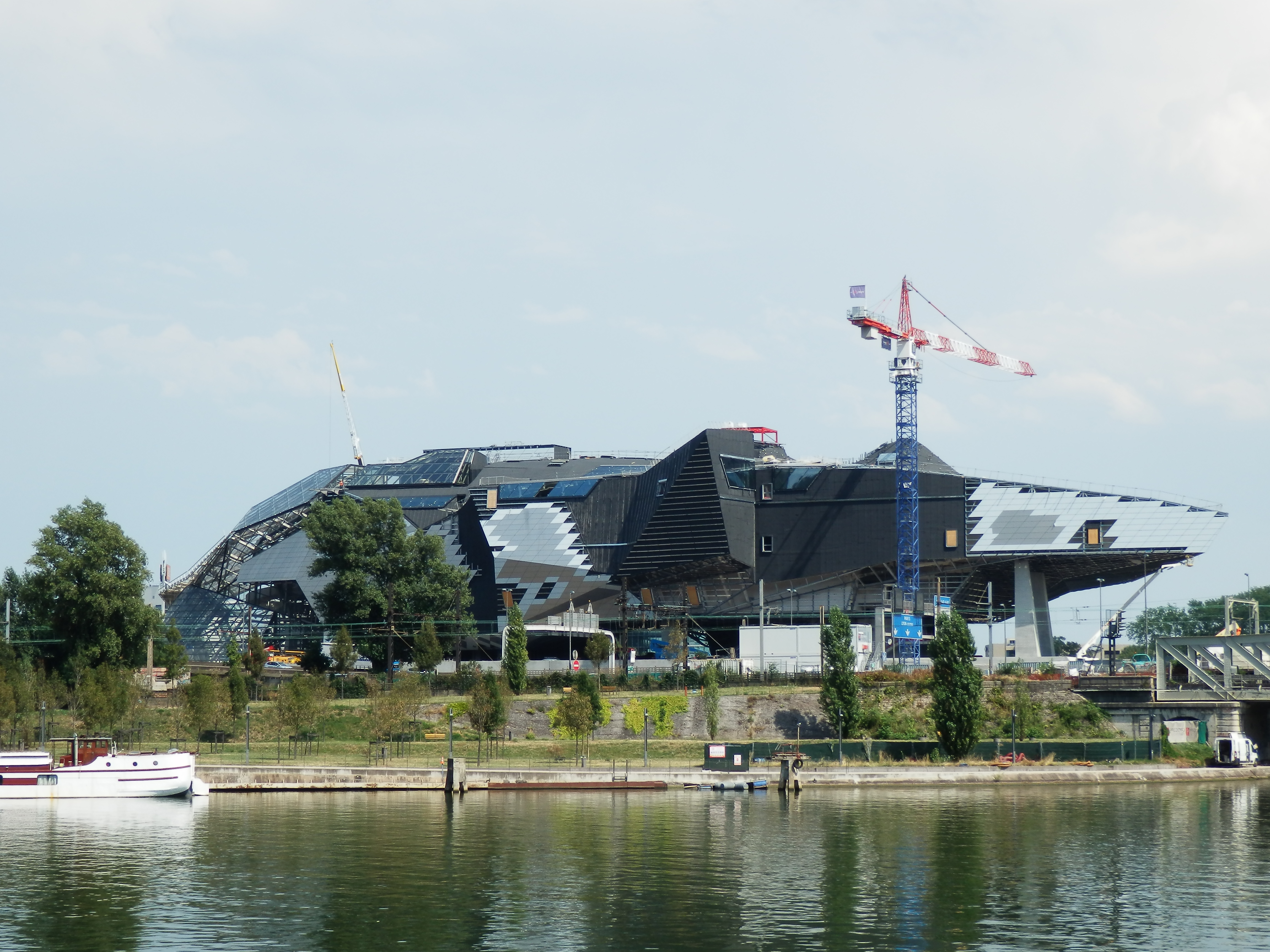
The museum under construction, photo: 6 August 2013

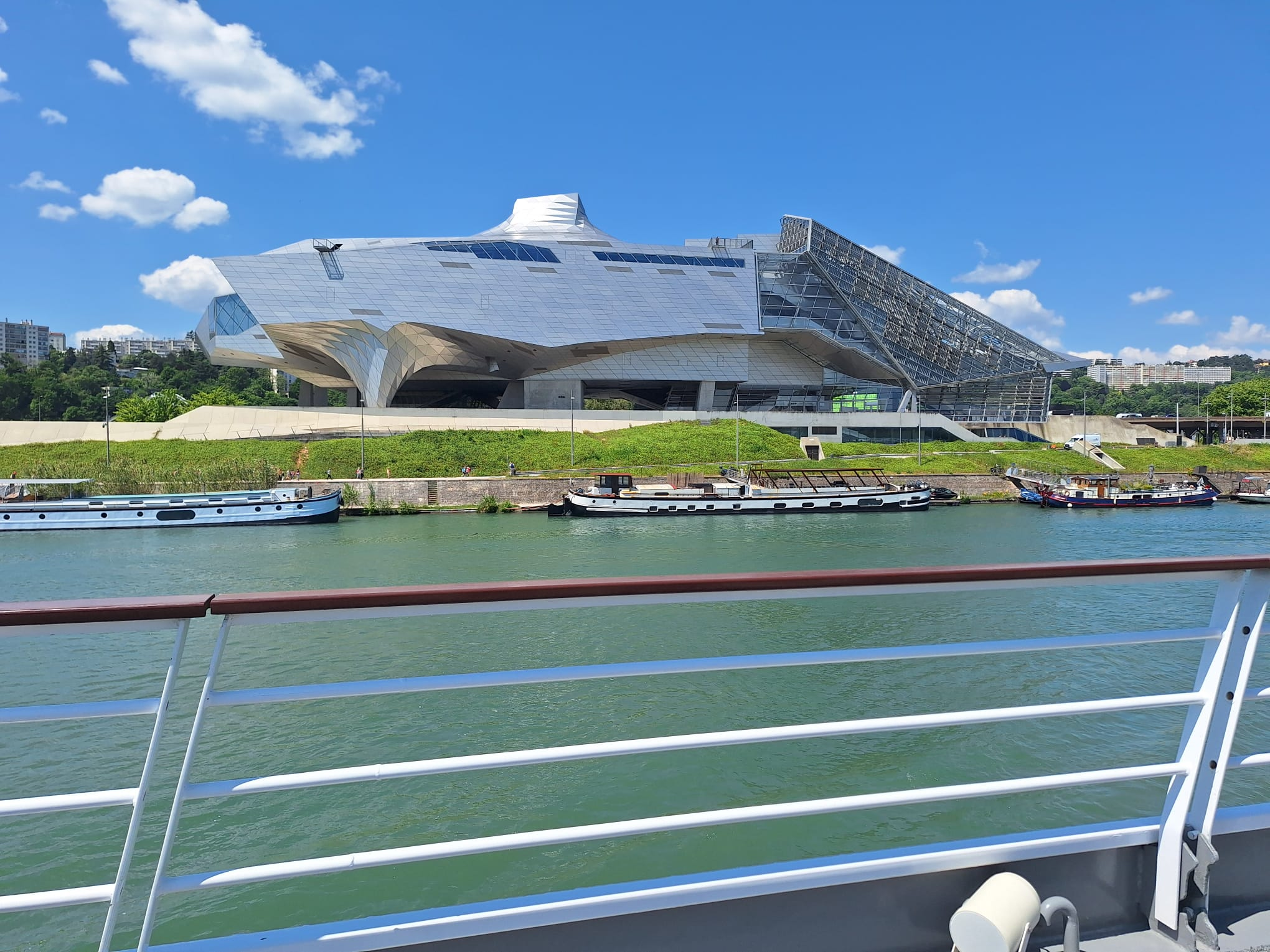
The Musée des Confluences from the Rhône, 2025.

The museum stands 44 m (144 ft) high, 150 m (492 ft) long, and 83 m (272 ft) wide. Total area will be 22,000 m^{2} (238,000 sq ft), 6,500 of which will be devoted to exhibitions, three times greater than the museum exhibition space. Nine concurrent exhibitions (4 permanent + 5 temporary), plus four discovery spaces and two auditoriums will be available. Construction cost was budgeted for €153 million, but the controversial final cost is now forecast to approach nearly €300 million.

== See also ==
- List of museums in France
