= French Crown Jewels =

Symbols of French power, 752–1825

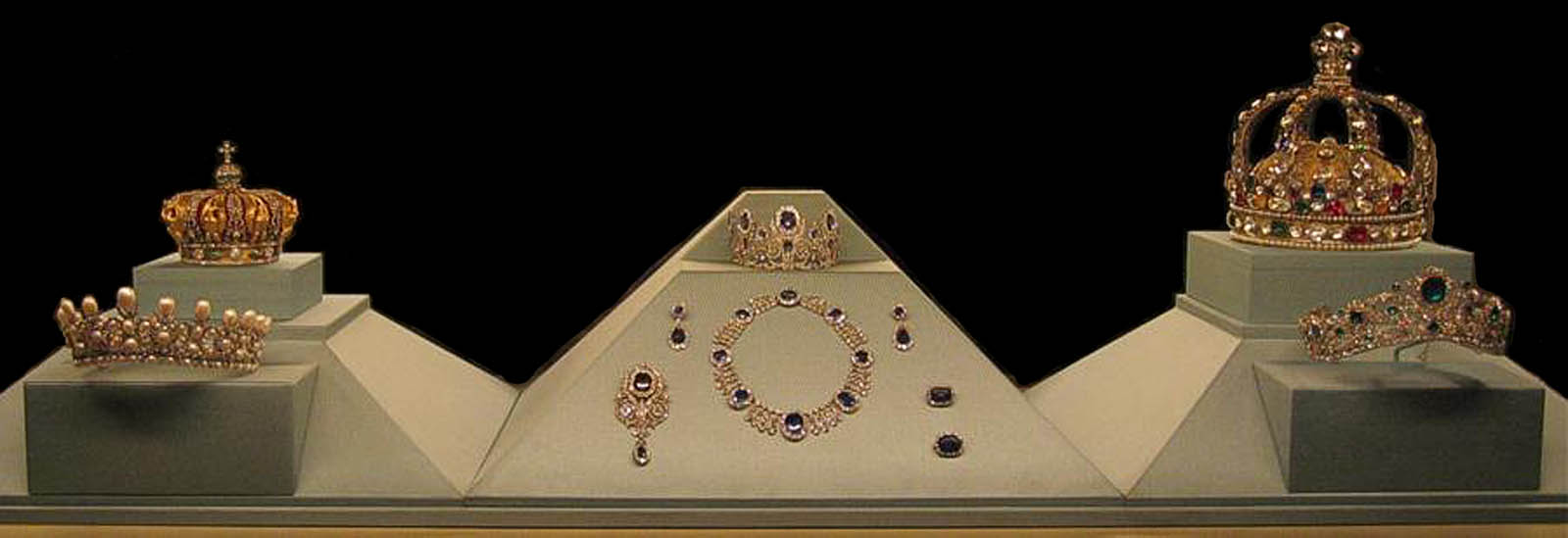
Crown Jewels of France, on display at the Louvre with the crown and diadem of Empress Eugénie to the left, the set of Queen Marie Amélie in the centre, and the crown of Louis XV to the right with the diadem of the Duchess of Angoulême

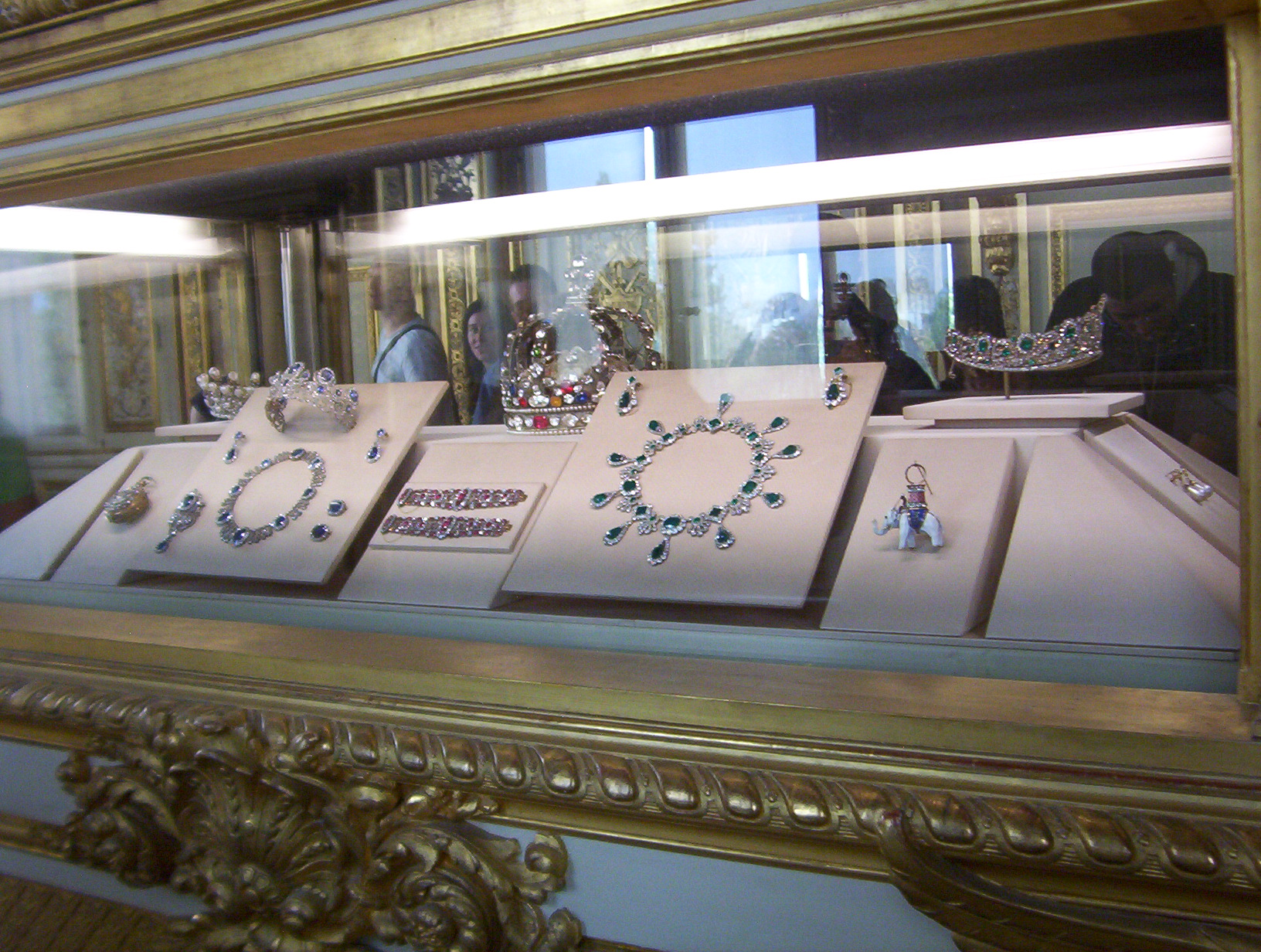
The Côte-de-Bretagne red spinel with the set of Queen Marie Amélie to the left, the bracelets and diadem of the Duchess of Angoulême in the centre and upper right and, between them, the set of Empress Josephine

The French Crown Jewels (French: Joyaux de la Couronne de France) and Regalia comprise the crowns, orb, sceptres, diadems and jewels that were symbols of royal or imperial power between 752 and 1870. These were worn by many kings and queens of France as well as Emperor Napoleon. The set was finally broken up, with most of it sold off in 1885 by the Third Republic. The surviving French Crown Jewels, principally a set of historic crowns, diadems and parures, are mainly on display in the Galerie d'Apollon of the Louvre, France's premier museum and former royal palace, together with the Regent Diamond, the Sancy Diamond and the 105-carat (21.0 g) Côte-de-Bretagne red spinel, carved into the form of a dragon. In addition, some gemstones and jewels (including the Emerald of Saint Louis, the Ruspoli sapphire and the diamond pins of Queen Marie Antoinette) are on display in the Treasury vault of the Mineralogy gallery in the National Museum of Natural History.

On 19 October 2025, eight of the jewels were stolen from the Galerie d'Apollon. The location of the stolen jewels is unknown; the Crown of Empress Eugénie was also initially stolen but was dropped during the thieves' escape and recovered in a damaged condition. The exact extent of the damage is still unknown, but was later revealed to be severe, with "delicate" repair needed for possible restoration.

== Use of the French crown jewels ==
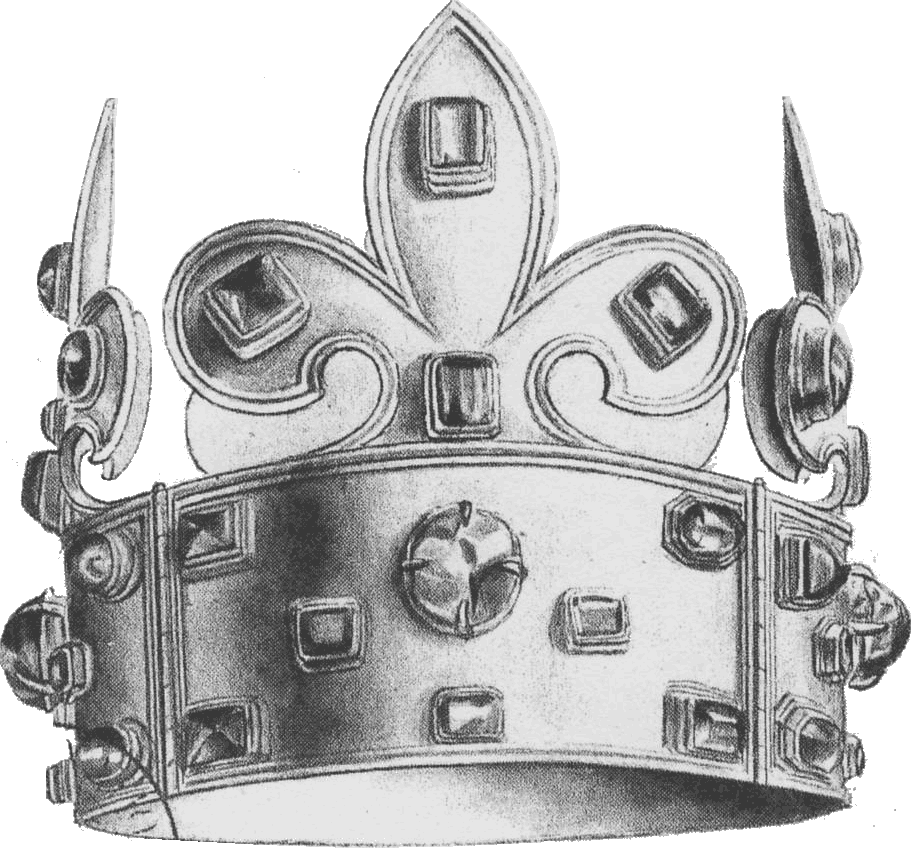
The Crown of Charlemagne from 1271, used as the French coronation crown from 875 or 1271 to 1775.

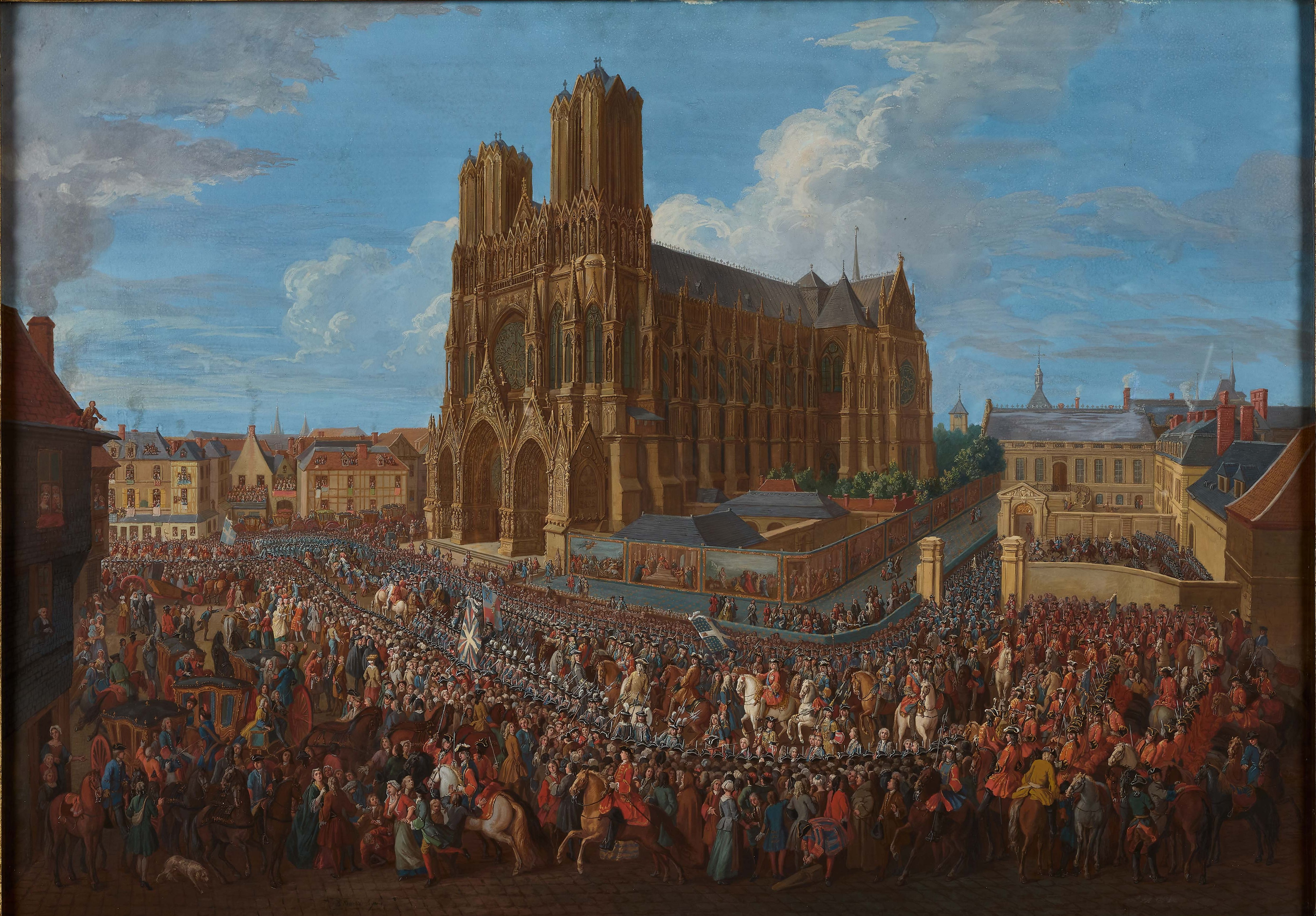
Procession of Louis XV after his coronation in Notre-Dame de Reims, traditional location of the coronations of Kings of France.

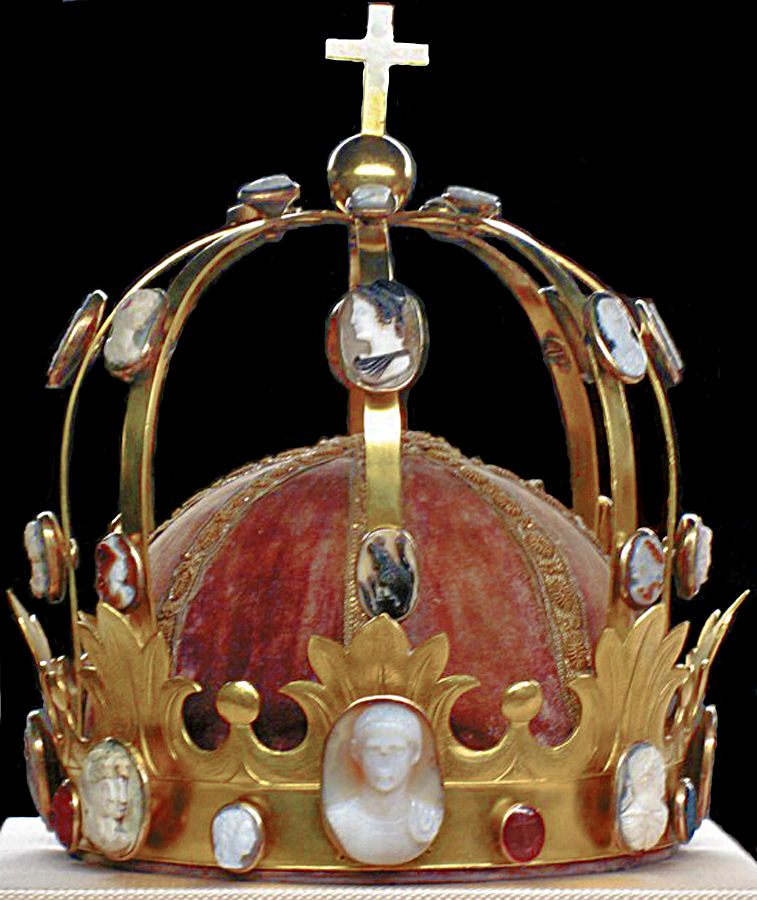
The Crown of Napoleon created in 1804, Louvre.

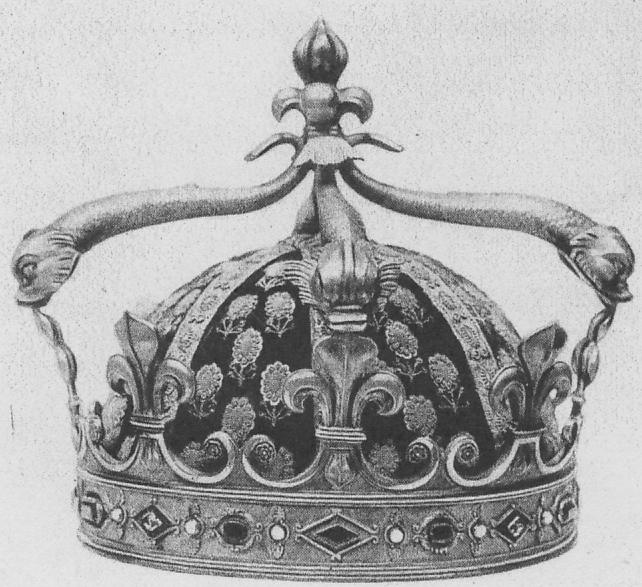
Crown of the Dauphin, Louis Antoine, worn at the coronation of Charles X in 1825.

The Crown jewels comprise the instruments of the coronation, called the Regalia, and the jewels of the ruling family. Since Pepin the Short in 752, the accession of the King of France was legitimated by a coronation ceremony called a sacre, since the emphasis was on the unction with the chrism of the Holy Ampulla, performed for the first time at Notre-Dame de Reims in 816 for Louis the Pious, then with the Crown of Charlemagne. From 888 to 922, then 1027, all monarchs were crowned until the French Revolution, in the Notre-Dame de Reims cathedral (apart from Louis VI and Henry IV, who were crowned in Orléans and Chartres). After the revolution, only Emperor Napoleon, Empress Joséphine and King Charles X were crowned. Though not always used, a set of expensive crown jewels did exist and was augmented by various monarchs.

The Crown Jewels or Diamants de la Couronne de France, consisting of gemstones and jewellery, became unalienable by decision of Francis I on June 15, 1530. The Côte-de-Bretagne red spinel was then among the 8 main jewels. They suffered important loss by the Catholic League in 1590 but were reconstituted by Henry IV and greatly enhanced by Louis XIV, notably with the gift of the 18 Mazarin diamonds and the purchase of the 'Royal French Blue' and 'Ruspoli' sapphire, later followed in 1717 with the Regent Diamond. Under Louis XV, they were kept in the Garde Meuble de la Couronne (Royal Treasury) in one of the pavilions of the Place de la Concorde, where they suffered a theft in 1792 and a sale in 1795 after their partial recovery. In 1814, Napoleon had restored the crown jewels to 65,072 stones and pearls, not including the personal jewels of both Empress Joséphine and Empress Marie Louise. Enhanced during the Restoration and again during the Second Empire, they counted 77,662 stones and pearls, comprising 51,403 brilliant cut diamonds, 21,119 rose cut diamonds, 2962 pearls, 507 rubies, 136 sapphires, 250 emeralds, 528 turquoises, 22 opals, 235 amethysts and 500 other stones, when they were sold in 1885 by the Third Republic. Nevertheless, as in 1793, an important set of stones and pearls was sent to the Muséum national d'histoire naturelle and some of the most important jewels were bought back since 1953, which makes the collection still number more than 11,000 stones and pearls.

The Regalia, much lightly hit in 1590, were originally kept in the treasure of the Basilica of Saint Denis from which they were removed in 1793 during the French Revolution. Some few pieces of the treasure, considered of artistic value, were preserved and sent to the Louvre (which sold 9 of them in 1798), the National Library, the Natural History Museum, and the archbishops of Rouen (5 items) and Paris. The others were sold in 1793 like the chalice and two cruets of Saint Denis, or dismantled and melted down in April 1794, like the Crown of Charlemagne and the ones of Saint Louis and the Queens, with the rest of the basilica treasure including the cross of Saint Eligius, the screen of Charlemagne, the gilded altar of Charles the Bald or the large reliquaries. The liturgical instruments kept in Reims suffered the same policy. The Regalia were restored or recreated for the coronation of Napoleon, which at their turn suffered again partial destruction in 1819, and finally completed for the coronation of Charles X in 1825.

== Regalia and jewels at the Louvre ==
=== Crown of Louis XV ===
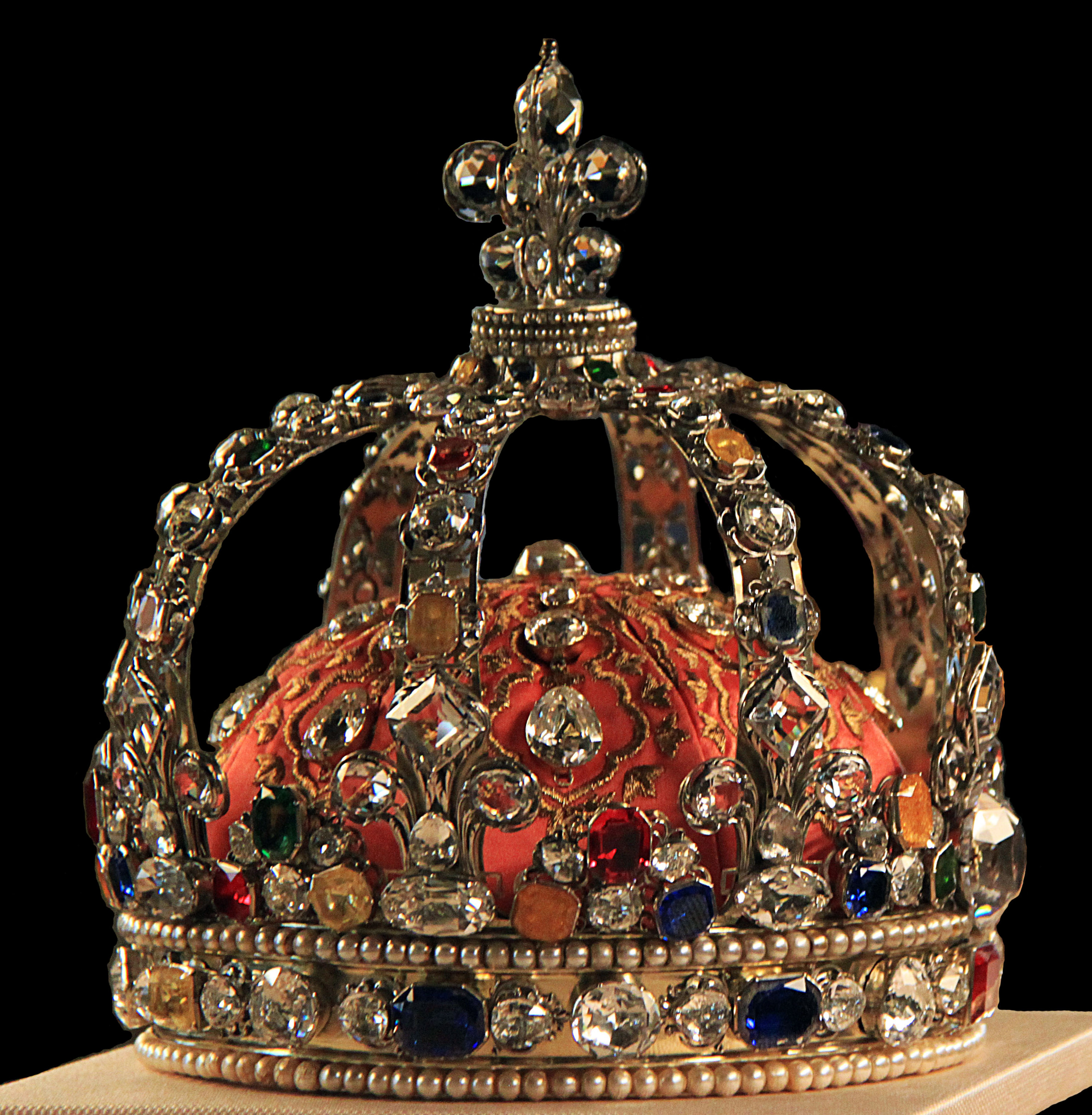
Crown of Louis XV

Of about 20 documented royal crowns of the Ancien Régime, the only surviving one from the destructions of 1590 and 1793 is the crown of Louis XV. The king had the Regent Diamond set in the lower part of the fleur-de-lis in the front of his crown, while eight of the famous Mazarin diamonds that the cardinal had bequeathed to the French Crown are set in the other seven fleur-de-lis and in the circlet of the crown. Diamonds and colored gemstones are set between two rows of pearls on the circlet and are also set into the four arches that rise behind the fleur-de-lis and the eight ornamental points between the fleur-de-lis. At the junction of these four arches is a small pedestal surrounded by two rows of small diamonds on either side of a row of small pearls. Eight larger diamonds set between this pedestal and the arches give the effect of a sunburst when the crown is viewed from above. On the pedestal rises a double fleur-de-lis formed of nine large diamonds, including the Sancy Diamond which forms the central upper petal of this double fleur-de-lis. The gold brocade cap which lines the crown is also ornamented with large diamonds.

Since the Middle Ages, and previous to the making of this crown, the crowns of French kings were adorned with gemstones like on the crown of Charlemagne or the crown of Saint Louis, sometimes called the Sainte Couronne. But some of the most valuable precious stones could be removed from them, since it was traditional for a French king to bequeath his crown to the treasury of the Abbey, now Basilica of St Denis, on their deaths. This crown was also bequeathed to Saint Denis on the death of Louis XV, but not before the diamonds had been replaced with crystals, and it is on display presently in the Louvre, similarly set with crystals.

=== Crown of Napoleon I ===
The crown of Napoleon was made by the jeweller Martin-Guillaume Biennais with antique cameos for the coronation of the emperor in 1804. His gilded crown of laurels was destroyed in 1819 by Louis XVIII with the one of Empress Josephine, the orb and the eagle sceptre. His coronation throne is at the Louvre and the coronation ring of Empress Josephine at the Château de Malmaison.

=== Crown of Empress Eugénie ===
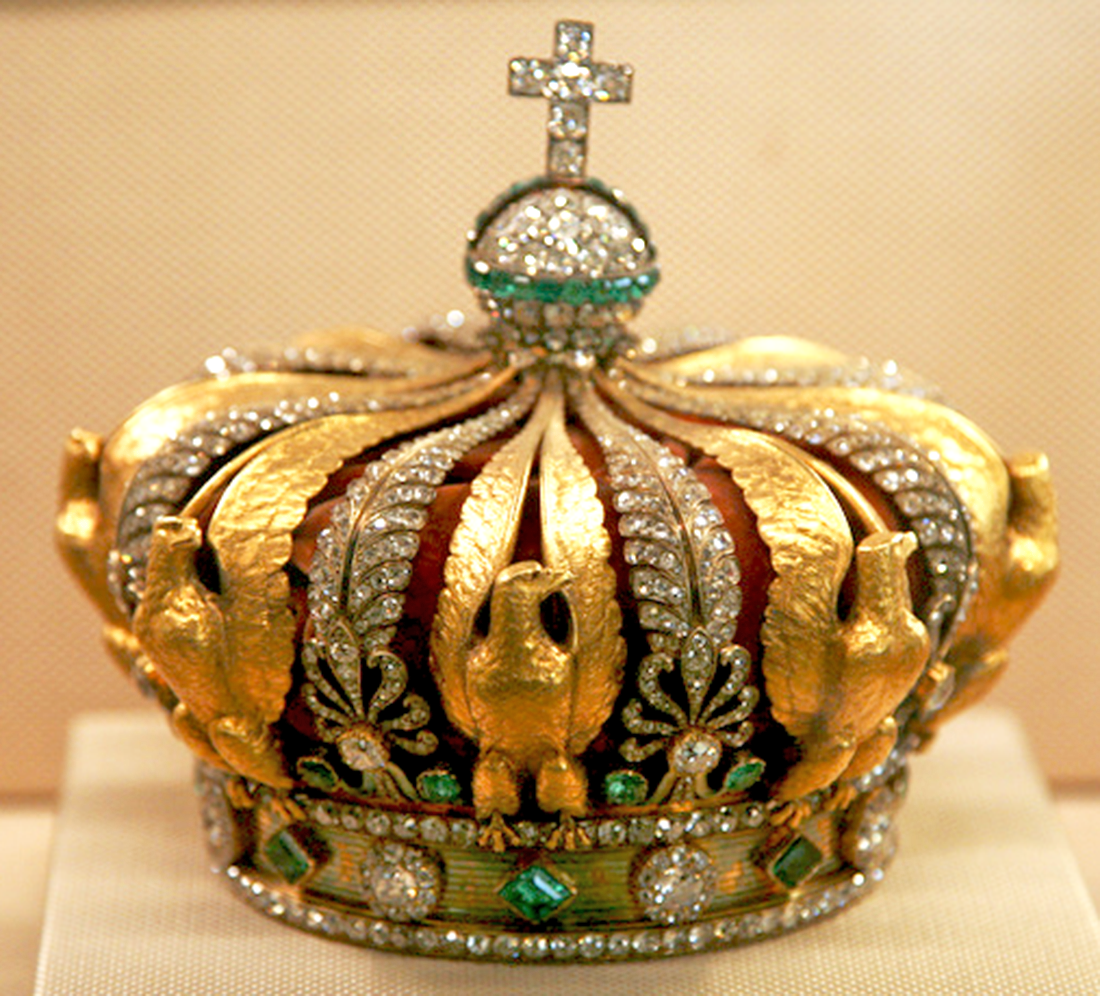
Crown of Empress Eugénie, which eventually suffered significant damage in October 2025

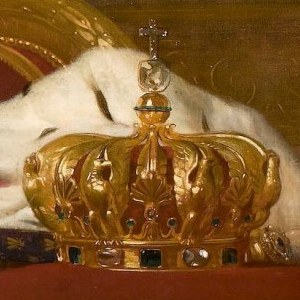
The crown of Napoleon III, as seen in a portrait of Napoleon III in 1865

The crown of Empress Eugénie was created in 1855 by Gabriel Lemonnier for the World's fair, like that of the emperor which was destroyed in 1887. But Napoleon III finally chose not to be crowned. Her diadem by the same jeweller is on display in the Louvre with a large diamond brooch by Alfred Bapst bearing two big Mazarin stones, as well as a large corsage diamond knot and a pearl and diamond shoulder brooch, both by François Kramer. On October 19, 2025, this piece was involved in a robbery at the Louvre but was recovered in damaged condition. Louvre president Laurence des Cars described the ability to restore the crown, which had been "badly damaged," as "delicate, but possible."

=== Coronation sword ===
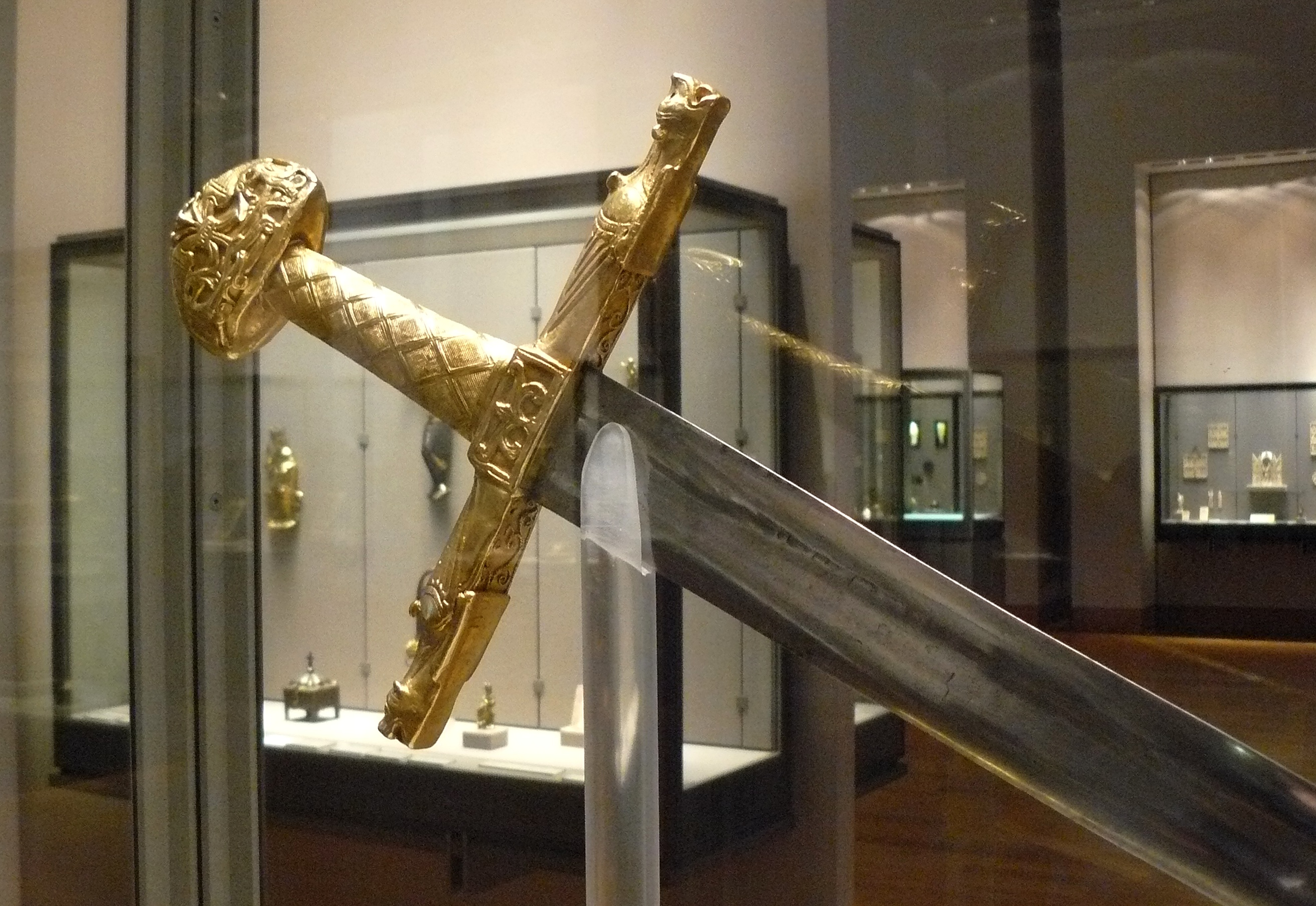
Joyeuse, the legendary sword of Charlemagne, in the Louvre, Paris.

The sword used during the coronation of the kings of France is displayed at the Louvre museum with its 13th-century scabbard, apart from the crown jewels. In the first part of the celebration, the king received the insignia of knighthood, consisting of spurs and the sword. Throughout the rest of the ceremony, the sword was entrusted to the "Connétable", who held it with the blade pointing upwards. The treasury of Saint-Denis possessed several medieval swords including the one of Saint Louis. According to legend the coronation sword is "Joyeuse", Charlemagne's sword. Its unusual build and ornamentation makes it difficult to date, but the parts probably date back from the 10th to 13th centuries. Some believe it might be much older, even manufactured before Charlemagne's reign.

The coronation swords of Napoleon I and Charles X also were preserved in the Louvre museum, although the first was transferred to the Palace of Fontainebleau with most of the preserved liturgical instruments and robes of the imperial ceremony and the latter stolen in 1976.

=== Coronation spurs ===
Some elements of the 12th to 16th centuries spurs were partially replaced for the coronation of Napoleon I.

=== Sceptre of Charles V ===
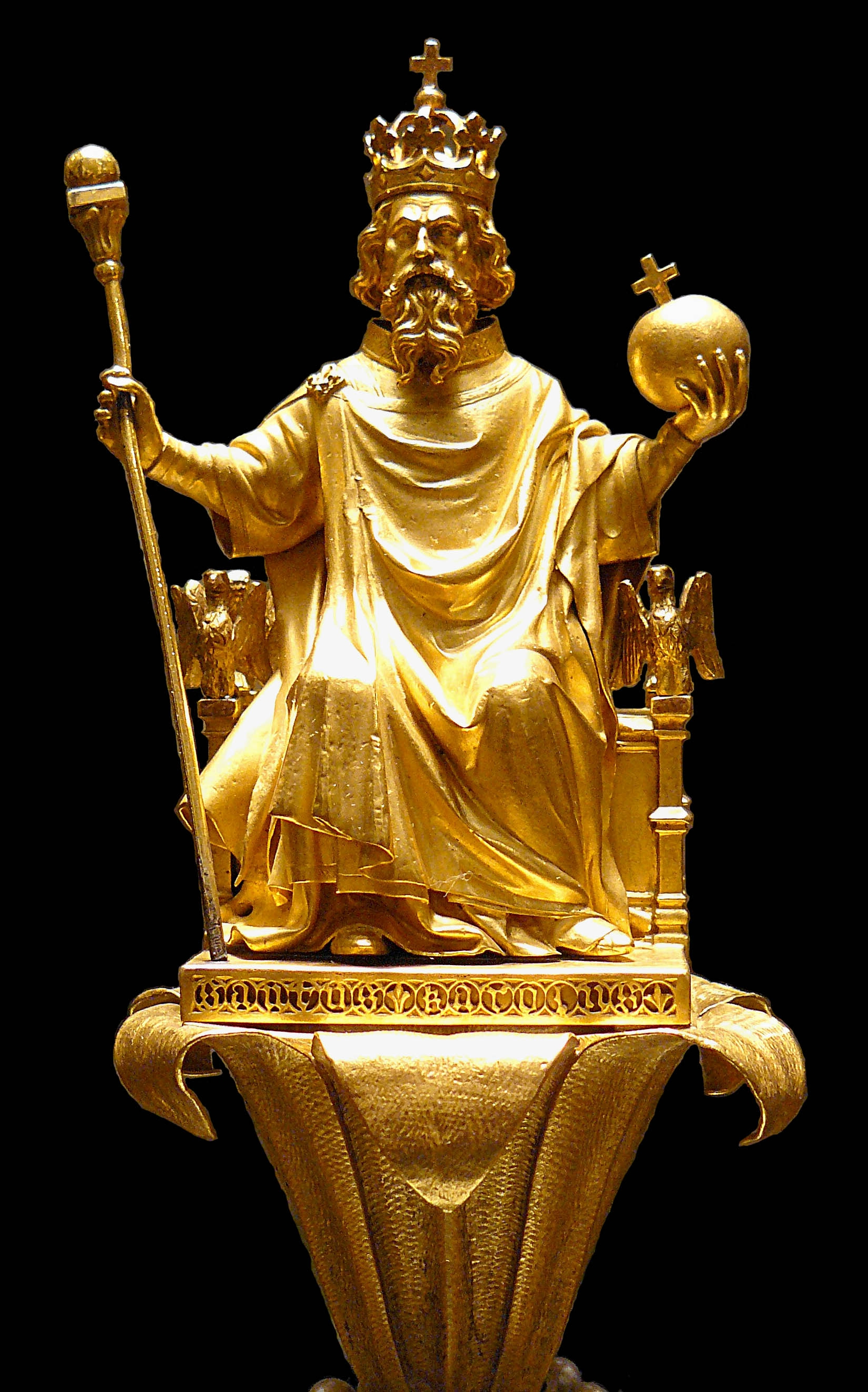
Statuette of Charlemagne on the sceptre of Charles V, 14th c., Louvre.

One of the few surviving pieces of the medieval French crown jewels is the sceptre that Charles V had made for the future coronation of his son, Charles VI, currently on display in the Louvre. It is over five feet long, and at the top is a lily supporting a small statuette of Charlemagne. This evocation of Charlemagne may also explain why this sceptre was included in the imperial regalia of Napoleon I.

The sceptre of Dagobert I was stolen in 1795 during the Revolution.

=== Main de Justice (Hand of Justice) ===
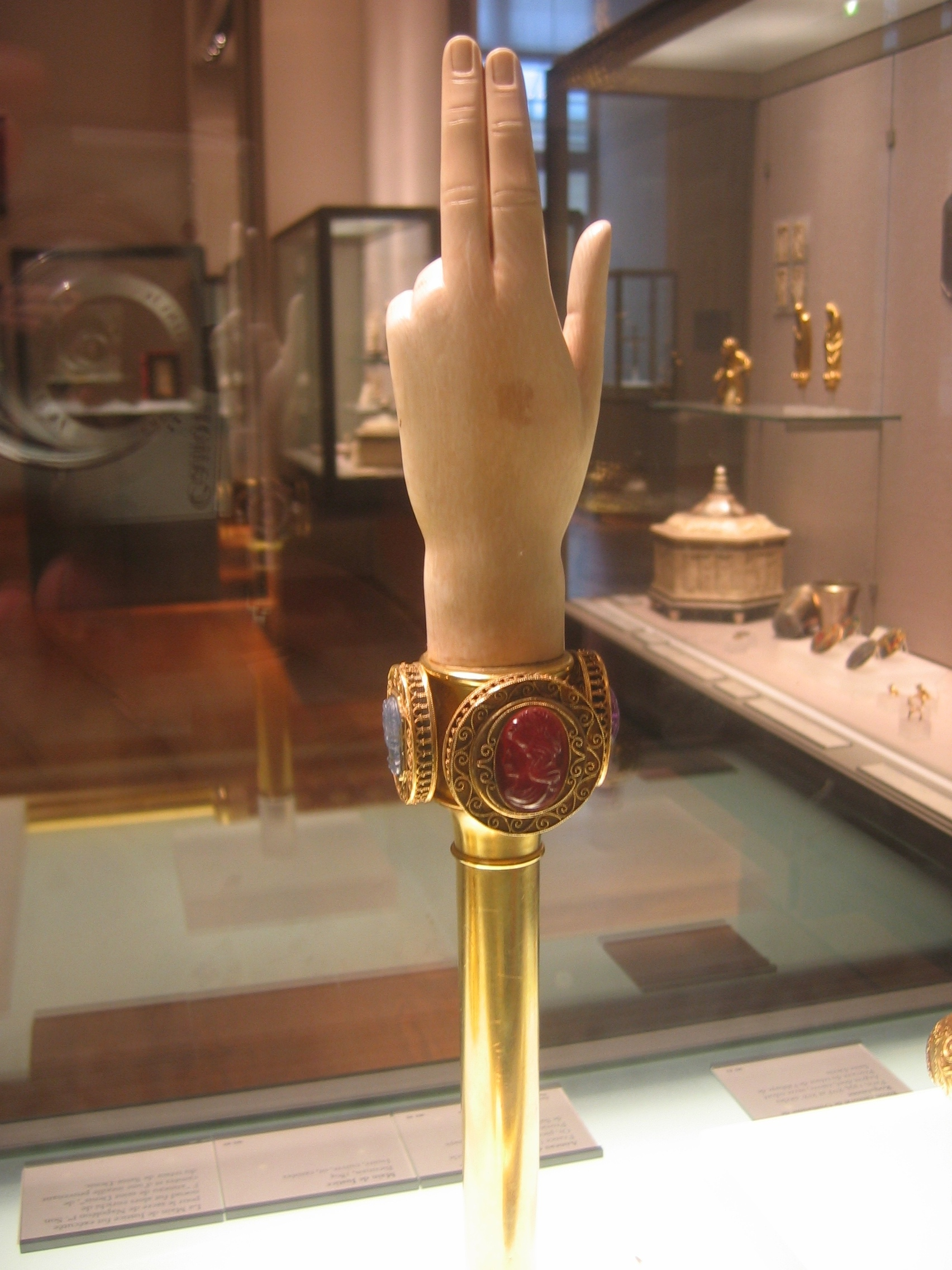
The recreated "Hand of Justice", Louvre.

A typically French type of sceptre is the Main de Justice (Hand of Justice), which has as its finial an ivory Hand of God in a blessing gesture was recreated in 1804 for Napoleon I . The addition of cameos and other medieval gemstones, like the 12th-century ring of Saint Denis which surrounds the junction of the finial and the replaced rod, represents a deliberate 19th-century anachronism.

Another sceptre, the Baton of Guillaume de Roquemont, and the ring of Saint Louis are at the Louvre.

=== Brooch of Saint Louis ===
The collection keeps as well the 14th-century brooch or fermail said of Saint Louis, a large diamond shaped fibula bearing a fleur-de-lis in precious stones, which was used to hold the coronation's robe.

=== Serpentine paten ===
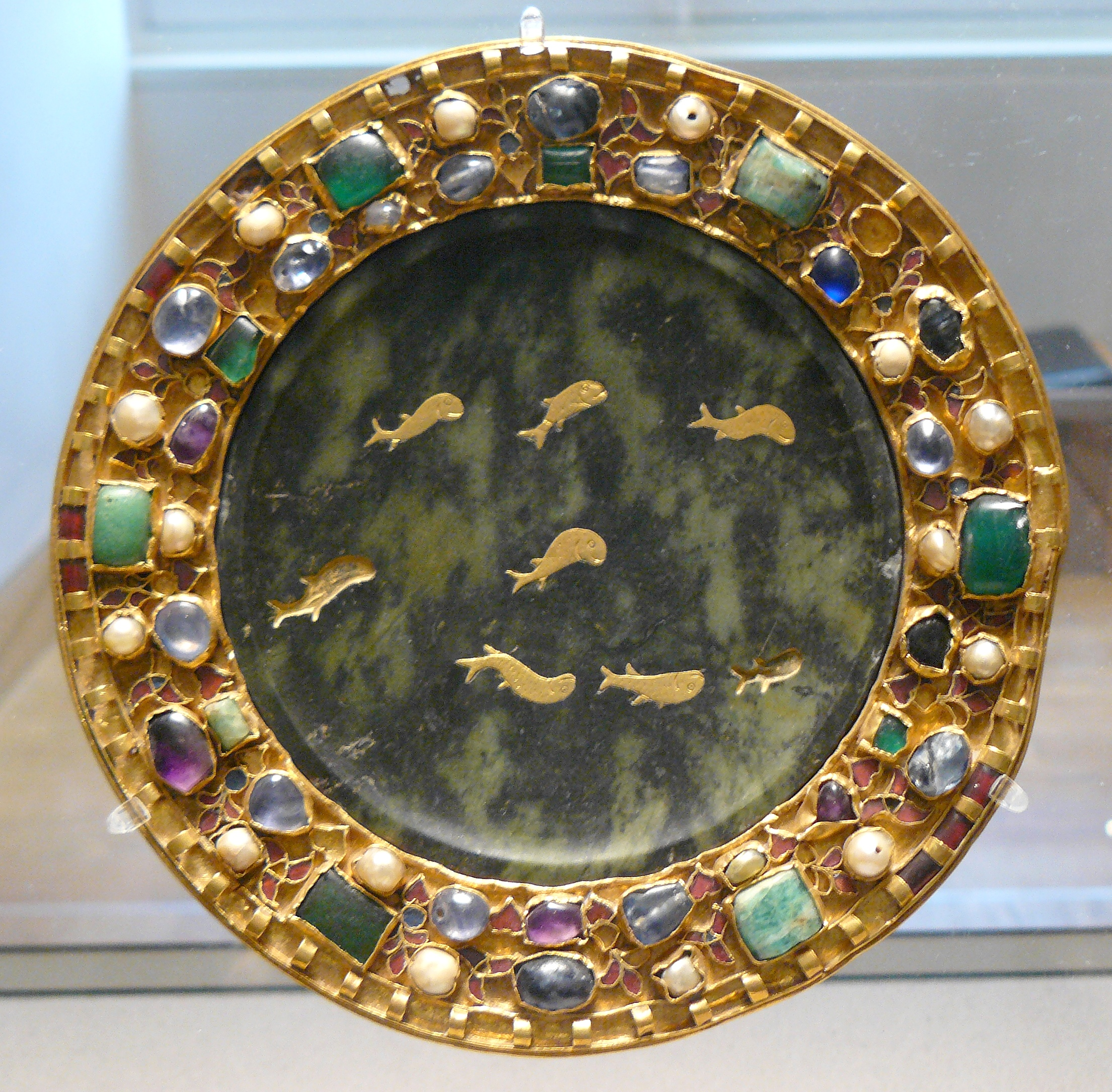
Paten of serpentine with inlaid gold fish, 1st century BCE or CE, with 9th-century mounts, Louvre.

The serpentine paten said to be of Abbot Suger of the 1st century BC or AD, associated with the Cup of the Ptolemies, was used at the coronation of queens and keeps its gem-studded gold Carolingian mountings of Charles the Bald.

=== Famous diamonds ===
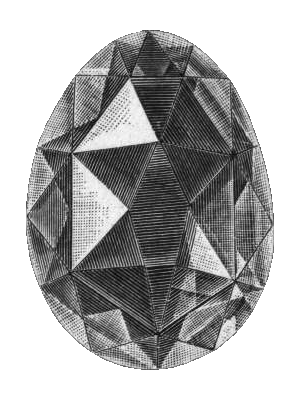
The Sancy Diamond

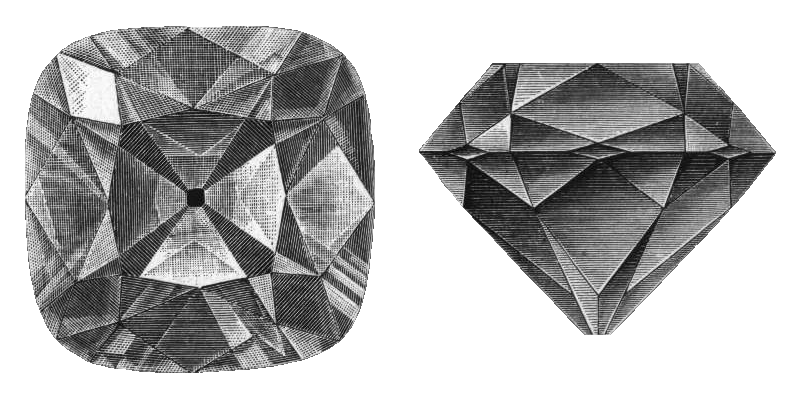
The Regent Diamond

Among the most famous diamonds preserved in the collection and now kept in the Apollo Gallery of the Louvre are the Sancy Diamond, which once had been part of the pre-Commonwealth Crown Jewels of England, the Hortensia pink diamond cut in 1678 for Louis XIV and above all the Regent Diamond. The treatment of the Regent Diamond epitomised the attitude of the French Royal Family to the Crown Jewels. While the Regent Diamond was the centrepiece of the King Louis XV crown, and worn by him at his coronation in February 1723, Marie Antoinette, wife of Louis XVI, wore it in a black velvet hat. The Royal French Blue was transformed into the Hope Diamond now in the Smithsonian Institution in Washington, D.C..

With two remaining jewels of the Renaissance, the Côte-de-Bretagne red spinel and the Dragon perle, a pin shaped into the form of a dolphin, the crown jewels collection contains as well among others, the emerald set and pearl earrings of Empress Josephine, the micromosaic and the emerald and diamond sets of Empress Marie Louise, the pair of bracelets of rubies and the emerald diadem of the Duchess of Angoulême, the sapphire set of Queen Marie Amélie, a diamond cross of the Order of the Holy Spirit and a diamond portrait box of Louis XIV.

== Gemstones in the Natural History Museum and École des Mines ==
Some gemstones and jewels are on display in the Treasury vault of the Mineralogy gallery in the Muséum national d'histoire naturelle. They include the 51.60-carat (10.320 g) Emerald of Saint Louis, the 135.80-carat (27.160 g) 'Ruspoli' sapphire the Topaze (28.10 carats) and great Emerald (17 carats) of Louis XIV, the diamond pins of Queen Marie Antoinette, the Diamond-portrait (9.10 carats) and the Amethyst of Empress Marie Louise, the great Opal of Louis XVIII, the bicolor Sapphire (19.67 carats), the Jonquille diamond (9.75 carats) and more than 800 pearls and stones. Furthermore, a set of 1044 stones and pearls is kept at the École des Mines in Paris.

== Regalia in the National Library of France ==
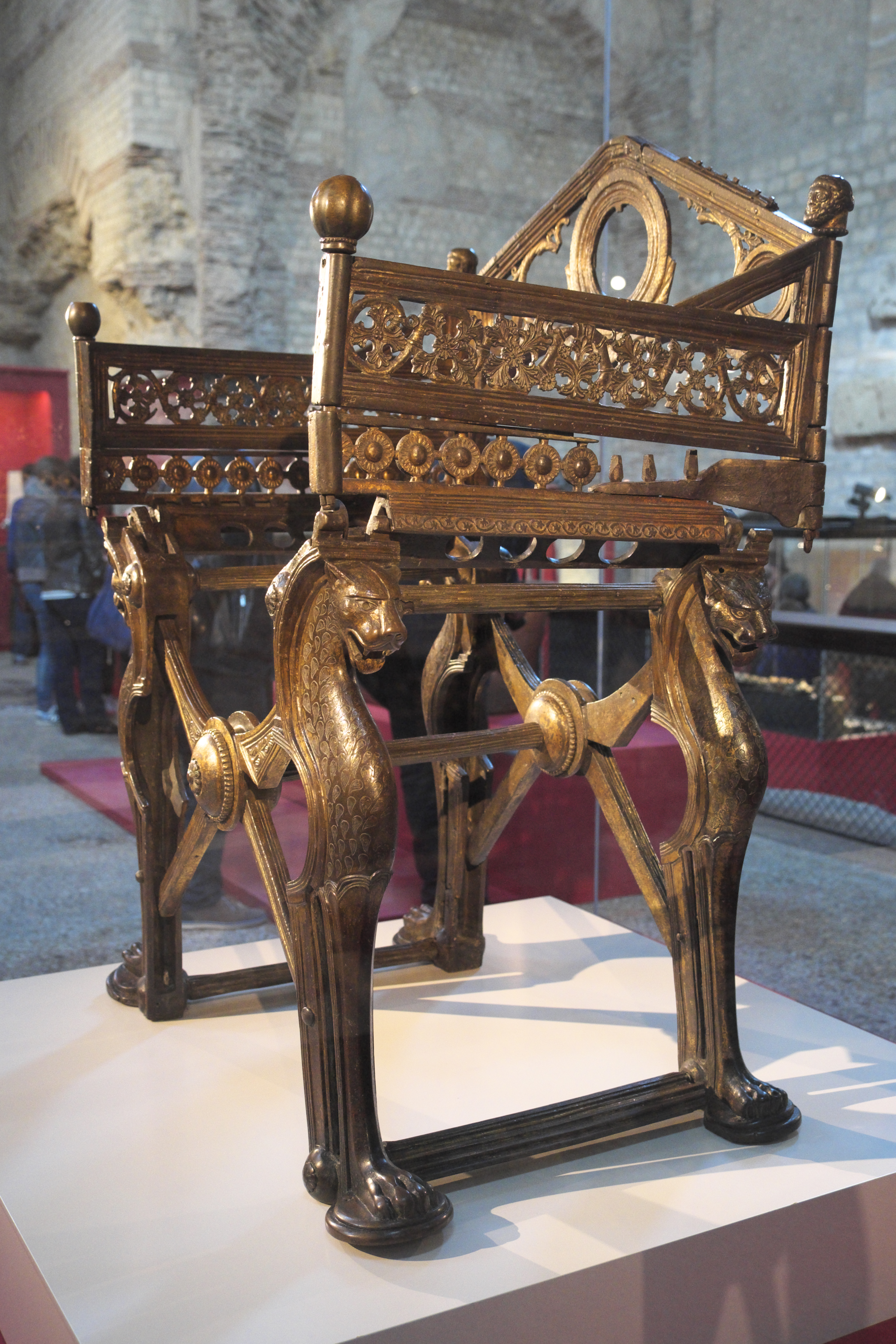
"Throne of Dagobert", traditionally attributed to Dagobert I, while the arms and the back of the chair were added under Charles the Bald. Cabinet des Medailles.

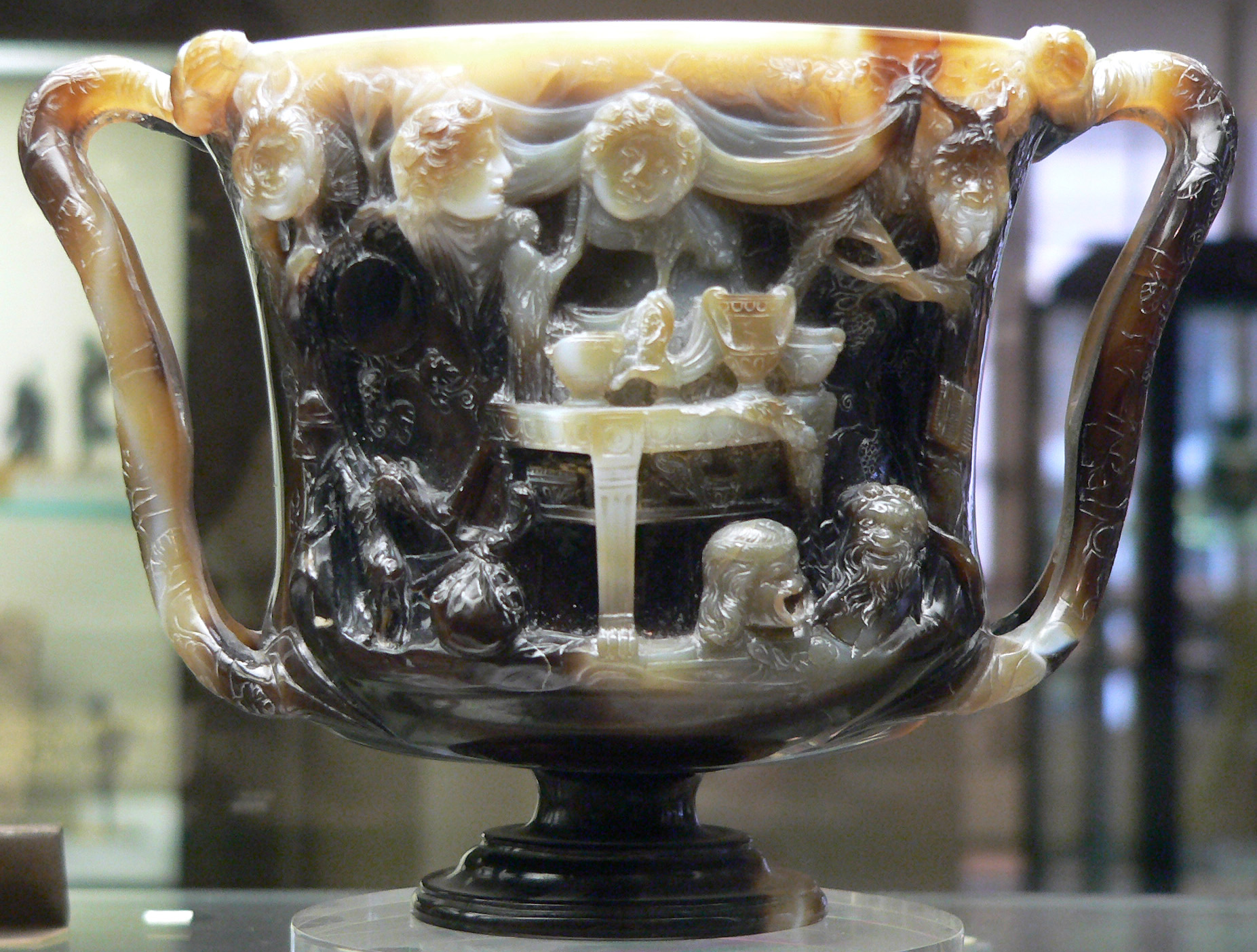
Cup of the Ptolemies, 1st century BC or AD Cabinet des Medailles.

The Throne of Dagobert coming from Saint Denis can now be seen on the Richelieu site of the National Library of France. The Cup of the Ptolemies was used by the queens to take ablution after holy communion. This masterpieces among hardstone carvings or engraved gems of Antiquity, was carved with Dionysiac vignettes and emblems, probably in Alexandria during the 1st century BC or the 1st century AD. It was stolen in 1804, and recovered without its Carolingian gem-studded gold mountings. Its serpentine paten is at the Louvre.

== Charles X regalia in Saint Denis ==
Some of the sovereign's robes of the coronation of Charles X and regalia specially made by Feuchère for this event including the gilt-bronze Crown of Charles X (his coronation crown was destroyed by the Third Republic) and the Crown of Queen Marie Thérèse of Savoy are displayed in one of the chapels of the nave of the Basilica of Saint Denis with the funerary Regalia of king Louis XVIII (sceptre, hand of justice and copy of the sword and scabbard of Charlemagne). The Crown of the Dauphin Louis Antoine Duke of Angoulême which subsists as well counts too among the six only surviving French crowns.

== Liturgical instruments and robes in Reims ==
The Holy Ampulla reconstituted with some recovered fragments of the original chrism for the coronation of Charles X in 1825, which was originally kept in the Abbey of Saint Remi, is now presented in the Palace of Tau next to the cathedral Notre-Dame de Reims with the coronation Chalice as well as several preserved sovereign's robes and gowns of kings of the Ancien Régime and the liturgical instruments made for the coronation of Charles X. They are displayed with the few remaining pieces of the medieval treasure of the cathedral and the Talisman of Charlemagne, a large sapphire said to have been given by the Caliph Harun al-Rashid which was found in the emperor's grave in 1804 and later offered by Empress Eugenie. Since 1906, the content of the Holy Ampulla is kept in Reims archbishopric.

== Last coronation ==
The last French coronation occurred in 1825 when King Charles X was crowned at Reims. The scale of the coronation was seen by critics to indicate a return to the absolutism of the Ancien Régime that had been ended by the Revolution of 1789. Some historians suggest that the very grandeur of the ceremony marked the beginning of the end for the Bourbon monarchy, with Charles's image as an old-style monarch falling out of favour with the French public, who had much preferred the low-key monarchy of his brother, Louis XVIII. Louis Philippe I, the last French king, was not crowned, and neither was Napoleon III, the last emperor. Napoleon III's consort, Eugénie de Montijo, did have a crown made for her, though it was never used in an official coronation.

== Break-up and sale of the French crown jewels ==
During the late 18th and 19th centuries, the jewels survived multiple regime changes: the French First Republic, the Directorate, the First Empire, the Restoration, the July Monarchy, the French Second Republic and the Second Empire. However, the decision of Henri, Comte de Chambord not to accept the French Crown in the early 1870s ended not just the prospect of a royal restoration, but also set in motion events that would lead to the break-up and partial sale of the Crown Jewels.

In 1875, the French Third Republic was established with the passage of a series of Constitutional Laws. While few expected a royal restoration—certainly after the failed Seize Mai coup by the Marshal Patrice de MacMahon, sitting president of the French Republic—the continuing agitation of extreme right-wing royalists fuelled fears of a coup d'état. Radical deputies proposed the sale of the Crown Jewels in the hope that their dispersal would undermine the royalist cause: in the words of one National Assembly member, "Without a crown, no need for a king."

After years of deliberation, a law enacted in 1886 authorized their sale. The sale commenced on May 12, 1887 at the Louvre, with the Ministry of Finance overseeing the operation. All the jewels from the Crown Jewels were removed and sold, as were many of the crowns, diadems, rings and other items. A few crowns were kept for historic reasons, but with their original diamonds and gems replaced by colored glass. Several historic or unusual gems went to French museums. The Louvre received the Regent Diamond, the Hortensia diamond, and the corsage brooch containing some of the 'Mazarin diamonds'. The French Natural History Museum acquired the 'Ruspoli' sapphire after curators successfully argued for its exemption, falsely claiming that its unusual rhombohedral faceted shape was a natural, uncut crystal.

The Brazilian beauty Aimée de Heeren, WWII secret service agent for President Getúlio Vargas, was known for being the largest private owner of the French Crown jewels, along with other important jewelry. The jewels were presents from Hugh Grosvenor, 2nd Duke of Westminster, who bought whatever he could find between the years 1939 and 1953.

== Theft of jewels ==
=== During the Revolution ===
The Crown Jewels were stolen in 1792 when the Garde Meuble (Royal Treasury) was stormed by rioters. Most, though not all, of the Crown Jewels were recovered eventually. The Sancy Diamond was found in Russia in the Vasily Rudanovsky collection. The Royal French Blue is believed to have been recut, and it is now known as the Hope Diamond.

The Hope is famously alleged to have been surrounded by bad luck. Marie Antoinette who supposedly wore it was beheaded (in fact, it was actually worn by her husband, Louis XVI, although he too was beheaded). Other owners and their families experienced suicides, marriage break-ups, bankruptcy, deaths in car crashes, falls off cliffs, revolutions, mental breakdowns, and deaths through drug overdoses. It was even tangentially associated with the case of the murdered Lindbergh baby, when its then owner, silver heiress Evalyn Walsh McLean, pawned it to raise money that she ended up paying to a con-man unconnected with the actual kidnapping. Most modern historians view the tales of a curse on the Hope to be spurious; the first mention of such tales is documented to 1908. Pierre Cartier, the Parisian jeweler, is widely credited with publicizing the stories of a curse on the diamond in hopes of increasing its saleability. Since 1958, it has been in the Smithsonian Institution in Washington, D.C.

The Crown Jewels were augmented by jewels added by Napoleon I and Napoleon III.

=== 2025 theft ===
On 19 October 2025, according to the interior minister Laurent Nunez, four men used a basket lift to break in to the Louvre, force open a window, and escape with jewels present in the Gallery of Apollo. The robbery took place between 9:30 and 9:40 am local time. A tiara and a brooch were among the items stolen from Napoleon's collection and the Empress's collection. It caused the museum to shut down for the day. No injuries were reported and later a jewel was recovered, which could possibly be from Empress Eugénie's crown.

== Gallery ==
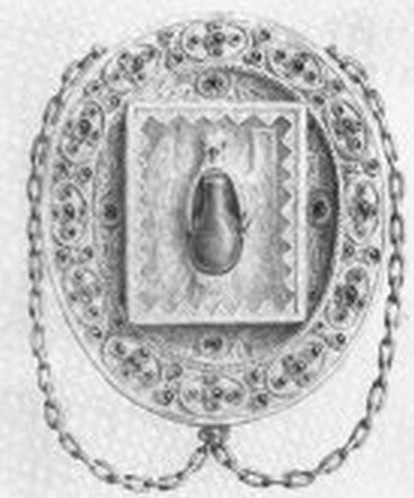
The original Holy Ampulla in its relic receptacle

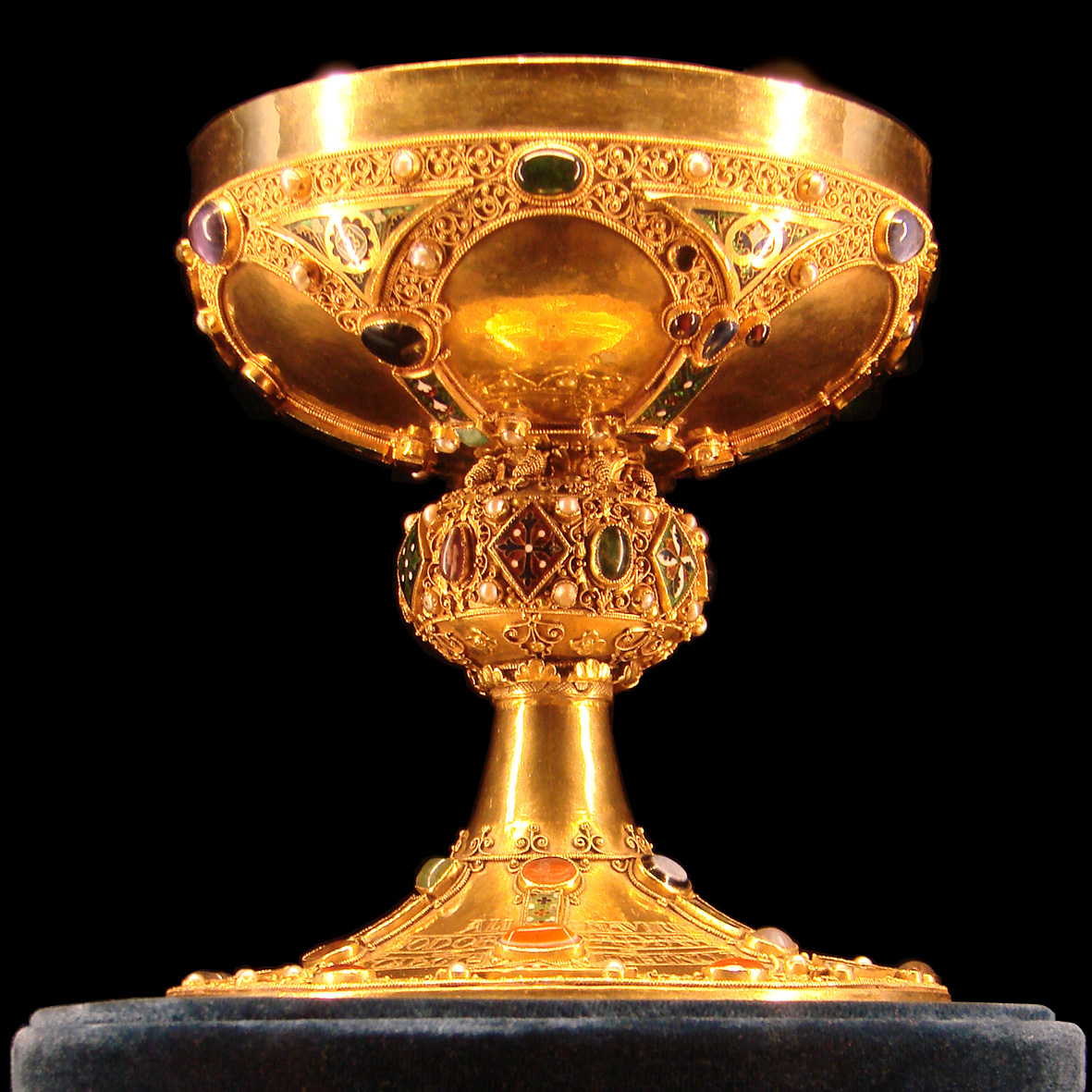
The Chalice of Saint Remi, 12th c., at the Palace of Tau, Reims

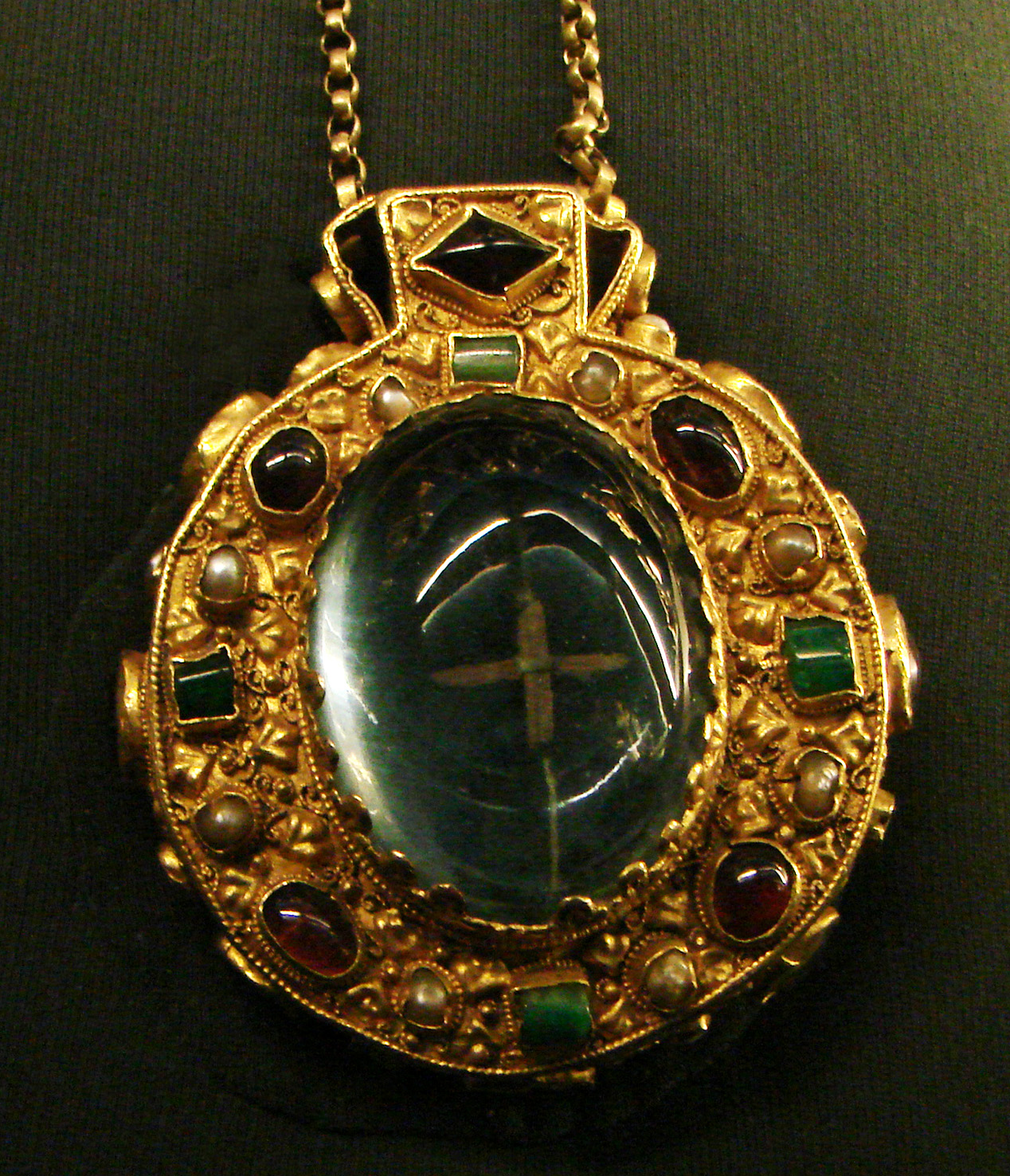
The Talisman of Charlemagne, 9th c., also a reliquary, found on his body when his tomb was opened

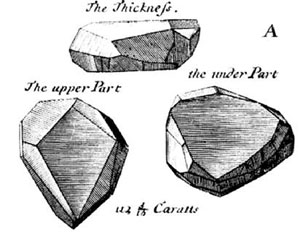
Tavernier's original sketch of the diamond which became the Royal French Blue

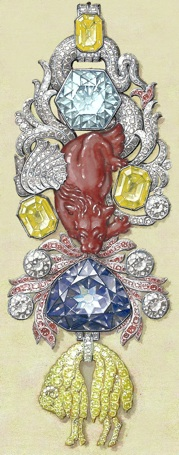
Gouache of the great Golden Fleece [including the "Royal French Blue"] of king Louis XV of France, version 1 of 2008, painted by Pascal Monney (ca. 16 × 6 cm)

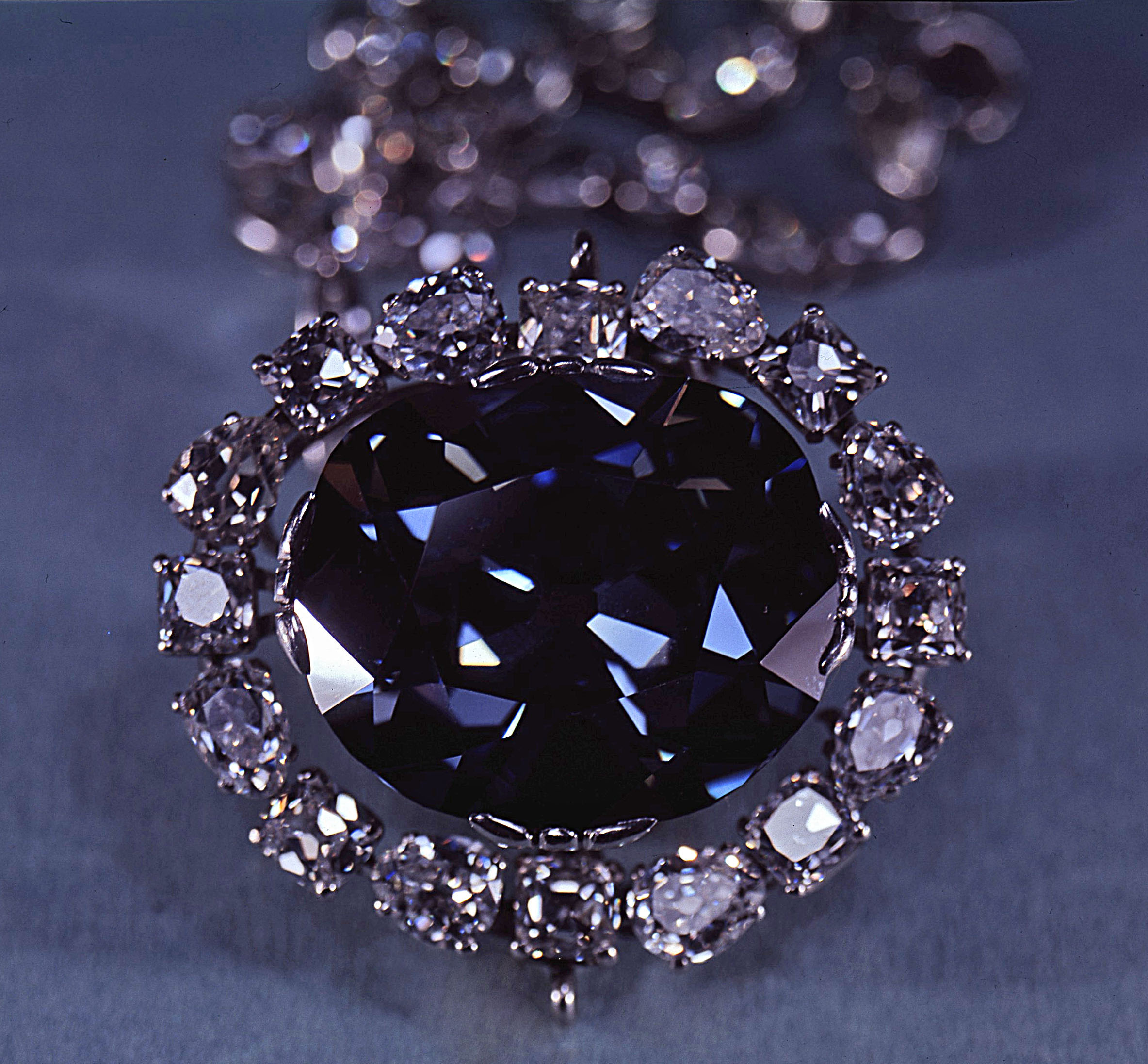
The Hope Diamond, which was cut from the Royal French Blue, part of the French Crown Jewels stolen in 1792

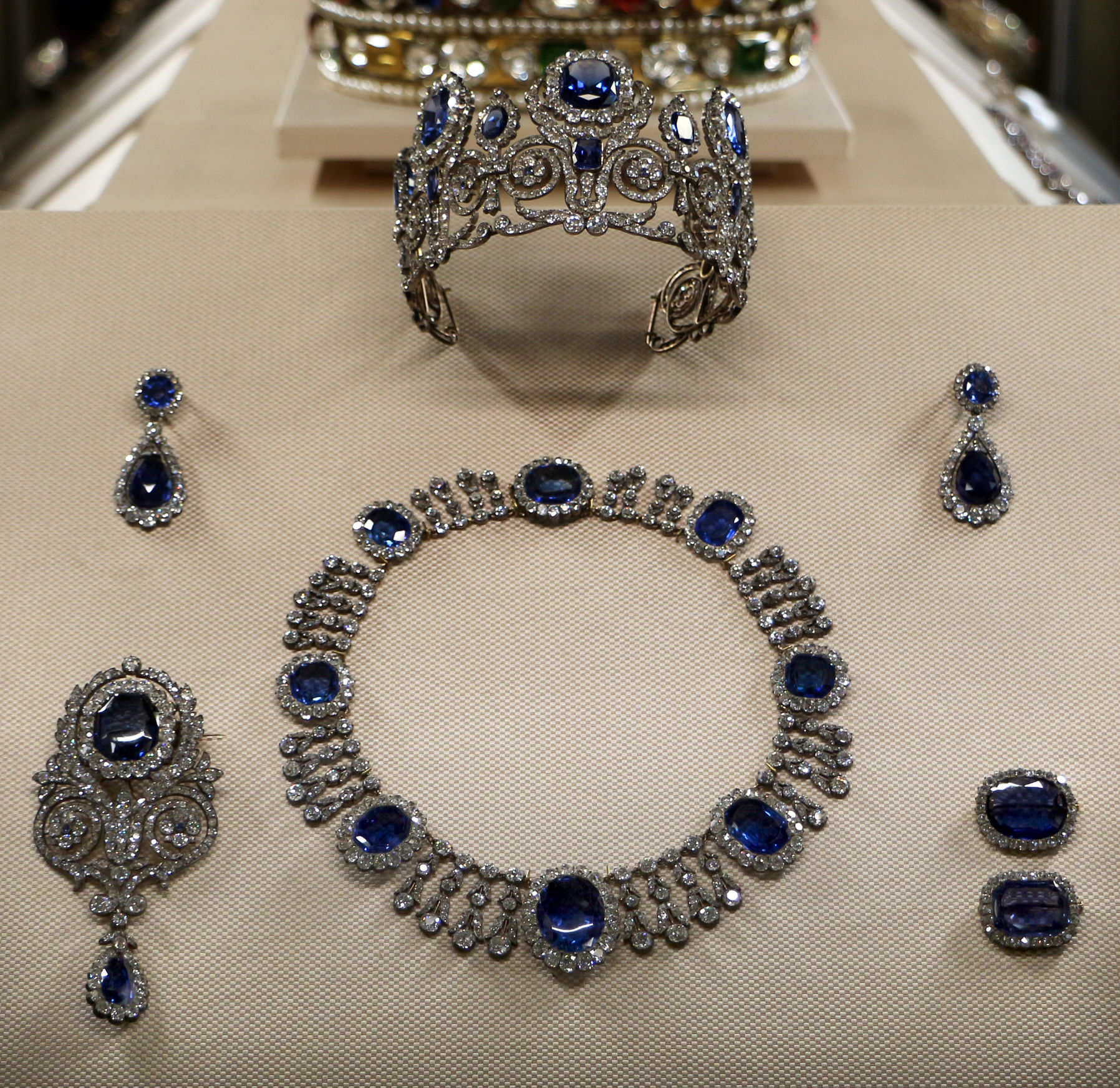
Sapphire set of Queen Marie Amélie bought back by the Louvre in 1985, parts of which were stolen in the 2025 Louvre robbery

== See also ==
- Regalia – Term for the formal dress of a monarch
- Treasury of Saint-Denis – Main repository of the regalia of the Kingdom of France
