= Crown of Louis XV of France =

Crown of Louis XV, king of France

Crown of Louis XV
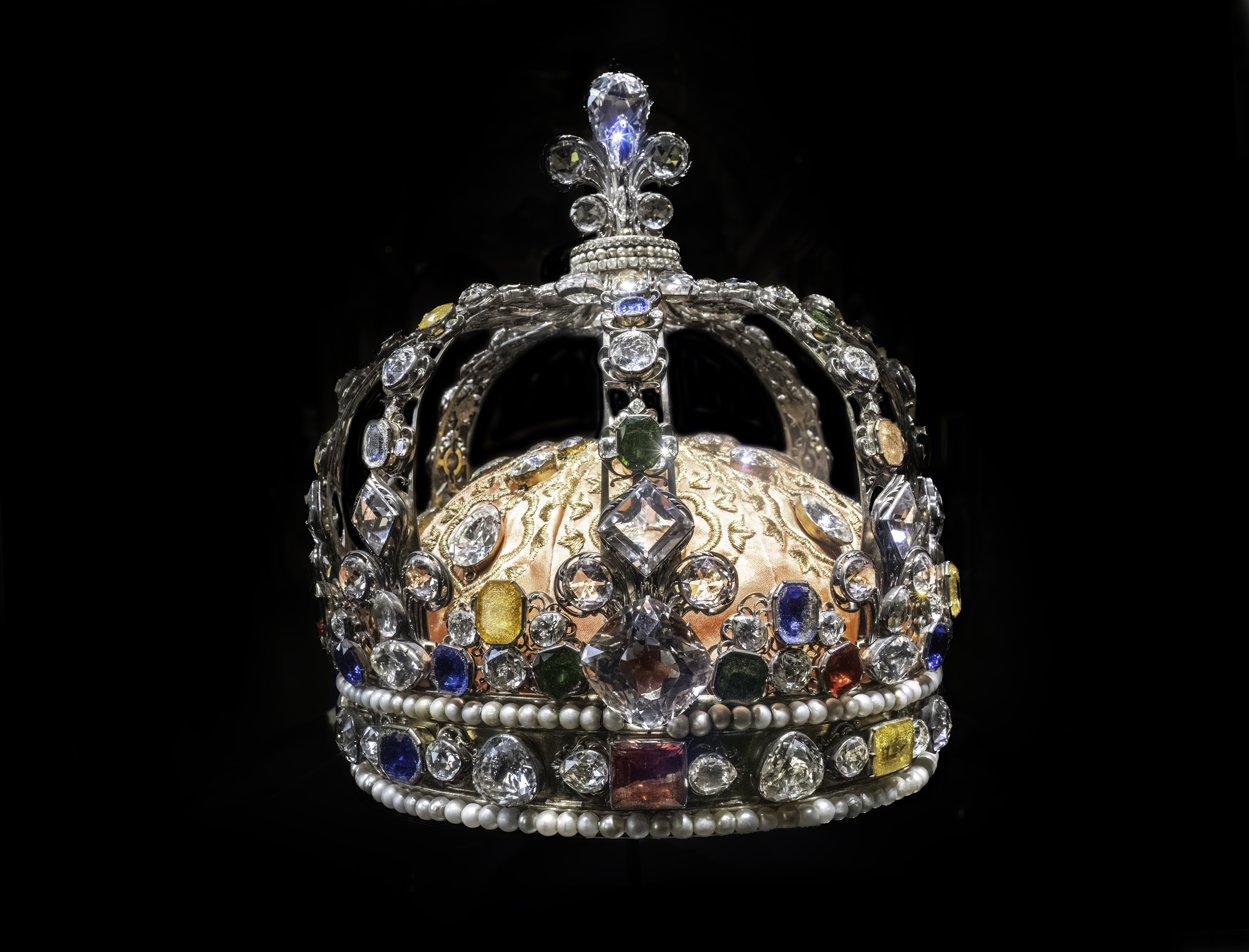
- The crown of Louis XV at the Louvre

Details
- Country: Kingdom of France
- Made: 1722
- Owner: France
- Material: Silver
- Successors: Crown of Louis XVI

The Crown of Louis XV is the sole surviving crown from the French ancien regime among the French Crown Jewels.

== History ==
The crown was created for King Louis XV in 1722. It was used at his coronation and was embellished with diamonds from the Royal Collection.

The new crown was made by Laurent Ronde, the French Crown Jeweller. It originally contained a collection of Mazarin Diamonds, the Sancy diamond in the fleur-de-lis at the top of the arches, and the famous 'Regent' diamond, which was set in the front of the crown, as well as hundreds of other precious diamonds, rubies, emeralds and sapphires.

All of France's about 20 crowns of the Ancient Regime, kept in the treasury of Saint-Denis, including the one said of Saint Louis or of Charlemagne, were destroyed in 1793 during the French Revolution. The crown of Louis XV was the only one to survive and counts, with those of the 19th century, among the only six remaining French crowns. It was used by Charles X at his 1825 Coronation in Reims Cathedral, the last occasion a French monarch was formally crowned.

In 1885 the French Third Republic decided to sell the Crown Jewels. Given its historic importance, the crown of Louis XV was kept, though its precious stones were replaced by glass.

It is on permanent display in the Louvre museum in Paris.
