= Wooden Spoon =

Wooden Spoon may refer to:

- Wooden spoon, implement
- Wooden spoon (award)
  - Australian rugby league wooden spooners
  - County Championship Wooden Spoons
  - List of Australian Football League wooden spoons
  - MLS Wooden Spoon
- Wooden Spoon Society
- Ruspoli Sapphire, aka the Wooden Spoon-Seller's Sapphire
