= Laurent Rondé =

French jeweller (1666–1734)

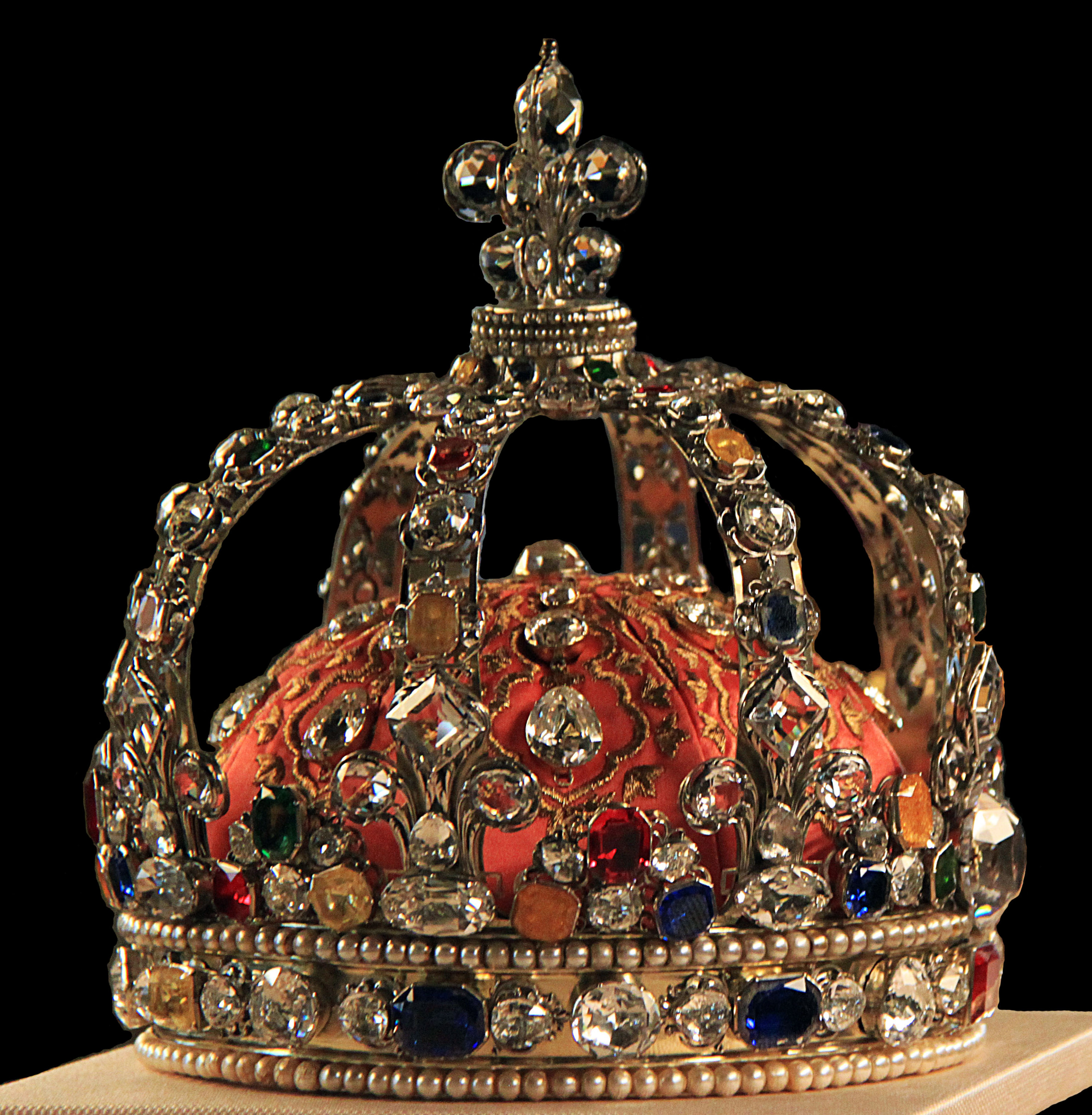
Crown of Louis XV of France

Laurent Rondé (24 July 1666 – 22 March 1734), was the Crown Jeweller of France in the early 18th century. His most famous creation was the Crown of Louis XV, which he designed and manufactured and which was used as the coronation crown at the coronation of 1722 in Reims.
