= Regent Diamond =

140.64-carat (28.128 g) diamond owned by the French state

Coordinates: 48.8605°N 2.3375°E

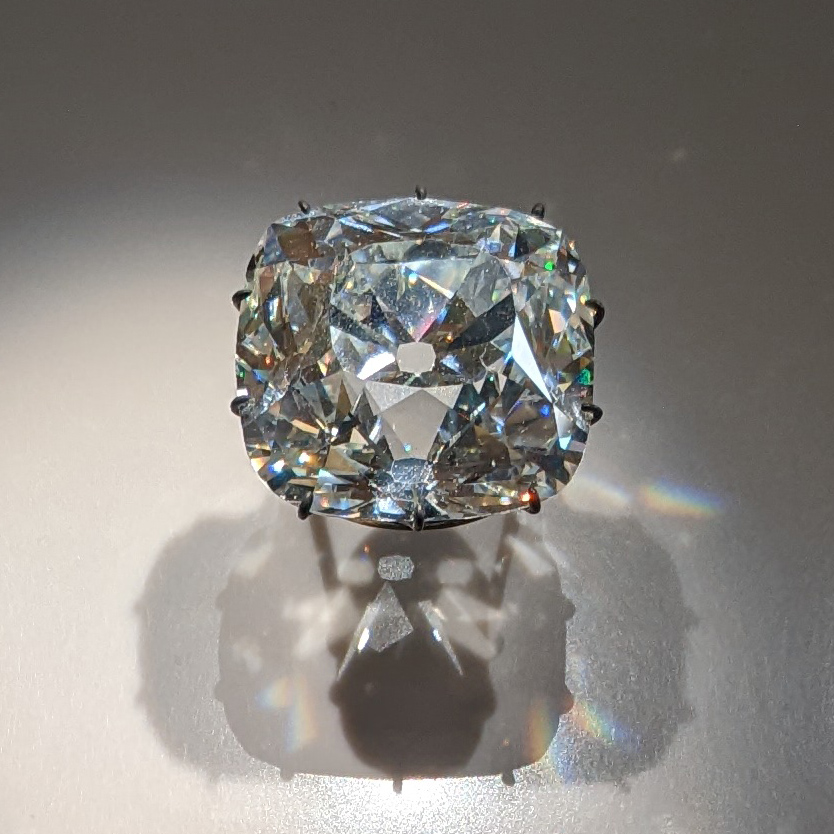
- Regent Diamond
- Weight: 140.64 carats (28.128 g)
- Colour: White with pale blue
- Cut: Cushion
- Country of origin: India
- Mine of origin: Kollur Mine
- Discovered: 1698
- Cut by: Harris, 1704–1706
- Original owner: Kollur Mine
- Owner: France (on display at the Louvre)
- Estimated value: US$60,000,000, CA$82 million

The Regent Diamond is a 140.64-carat (28.128 g) diamond owned by the French state and on display in the Louvre, worth US$60,000,000 as of 2025. Mined in India and cut in London, it was purchased by the regent of France in the early 18th century.

== History ==
=== Discovery ===
According to legend, the diamond was discovered by an enslaved man in the Kollur Mine near the Krishna River in India and was concealed by the slave in a leg wound, which he suffered while fleeing the 1687 siege of Golconda by the Moghul Emperor Aurangzeb. The slave then made it to the coast, where he met an English sea captain and offered him 50% of all profits made on the sale of the diamond in exchange for safe passage out of India. However, the sea captain killed the slave and sold the diamond to the eminent Indian diamond merchant Jamchand.

=== Pitt acquisition ===
In a letter to his London agent dated 6 November 1701, Thomas Pitt, the Governor of Fort St. George, writes:

"... This accompanies the model of a Stone I have lately seene; it weighs Mang. 303 and carr^{tts} 426. It is of an excellent christaline water without any fowles, only att [sic] one end in the flat part there is one or two little flaws which will come out in cutting, they [sic] lying on the surface of the Stone, the price they ask for it is prodigious being two hundred thousand pag. tho I believe less than one (hundred thousand) would buy it"

Pitt claimed he acquired the diamond from Jamchand for 48,000 pagodas in the same year, so it is sometimes also known as the Pitt Diamond. He dispatched the stone to London hidden in the heel of his son Robert's shoe aboard the East Indiaman Loyal Cooke, which left Madras on 9 October 1702. It was later cut in London by the diamond cutter Harris, between 1704 and 1706. The cutting took two years and cost about £5,000

Rumours circulated that Pitt had fraudulently acquired the diamond, leading satirist Alexander Pope to pen the following lines in his Moral Essays

"Asleep and naked as an INDIAN lay
An honest factor stole a gem away;
He pledged it to the Knight, the Knight had wit,

So kept the diamond, and the rogue was bit."

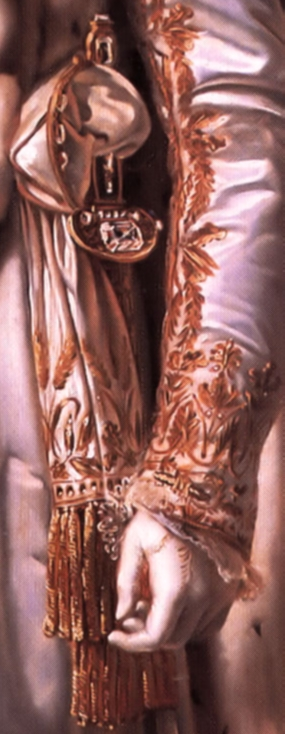
Detail of Napoleon's portrait with sword

Pitt bought the diamond for £20,400 (equivalent to £4,011,000 in 2025), and had it cut into a 141 carats (28.2 g) cushion brilliant.

=== Sale to the French Regent ===
After many attempts to sell it to various members of European royalty, including Louis XIV of France, it was purchased for the French Crown by the French Regent, Philippe II, Duke of Orléans, in 1717 for £135,000 (equivalent to £24,470,000 in 2025), at the urging of his close friend and famed memoirist Louis de Rouvroy, duc de Saint-Simon. The stone was set into the crown of Louis XV for his coronation in 1722 and then into a new crown for the Coronation of Louis XVI in 1775. It was also used to adorn a hat belonging to Marie Antoinette. In 1791, its appraised value was £480,000 (equivalent to £62,570,000 in 2025).

In 1792, during the revolutionary furore in Paris, "Le Régent", or the regent diamond, was stolen along with other crown jewels of France, but was later recovered. It was found in some roof timbers in an attic in Paris. The diamond was used as security or collateral on several occasions by the Directory and later the Consulate to finance the military expenses: 1797-1798 it was pledged to the Berlin Entrepreneur Sigmund Otto Joseph von Treskow and 1798–1801 to the Dutch Banker Ingace-Joseph Vanlerberghe in Amsterdam. In 1801 the gem was permanently redeemed by Napoleon Bonaparte.

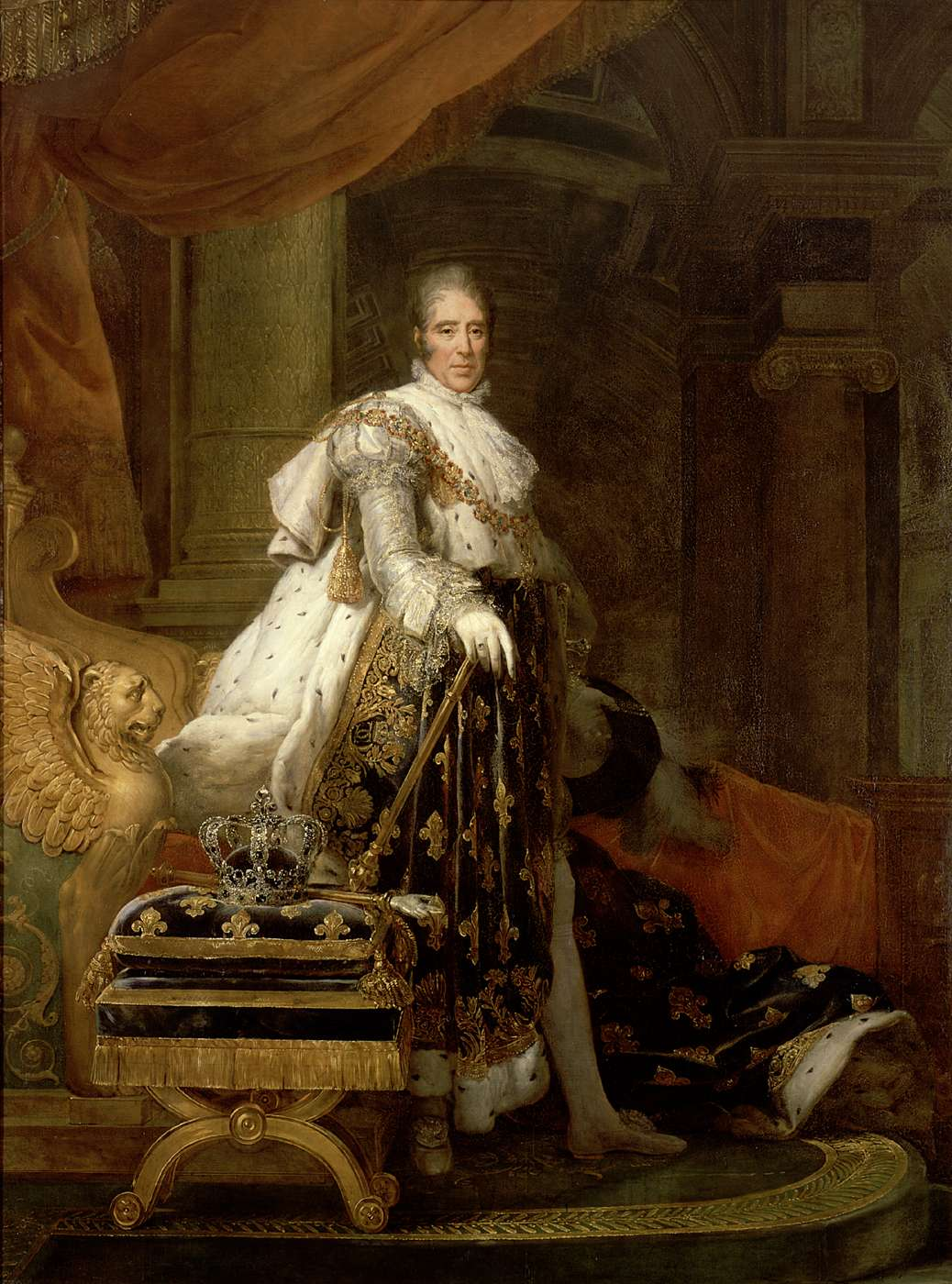
Coronation Portrait of Charles X by François Gérard, 1825. Note the Regent Diamond set in the Fleur-de-lis at the top of the crown at left.

Napoleon used it for the guard of his sword, designed by the goldsmiths Odiot, Boutet and Marie-Etienne Nitot. In 1812 it appeared on the Emperor's two-edged sword, which was a work of Nitot. Napoleon's second wife, Archduchess Marie Louise of Austria, carried the Régent back to the Austrian Empire upon his exile. Later her father returned it to the French Crown Jewels. The diamond was mounted successively on the crowns of Louis XVIII, Charles X and Napoleon III and later in a Greek diadem designed for Empress Eugénie. Today it remains in the French Royal Treasury at the Louvre. It has been on display there since 1887. Experts in the early 21st century have estimated the Regent Diamond value to be over US$60,000,000.

== Folklore ==
Due to numerous scandals, and the misfortune of those who have been in possession of the stone, the Regent Diamond is said to be cursed.

== See also ==
- List of diamonds

== Notes ==
Bibliography

- Brown, Peter Douglas. William Pitt, Earl of Chatham: The Great Commoner. Allen & Unwin, 1975
- Hedges, William (1889). Yule, Henry (ed.). The diary of William Hedges, esq. (afterwards Sir William Hedges), during his agency in Bengal : as well as on his voyage out and return overland (1681–1697). Vol. 3. London: Hakuyt Society.
