= Talisman of Charlemagne =

Relic from the 9th century

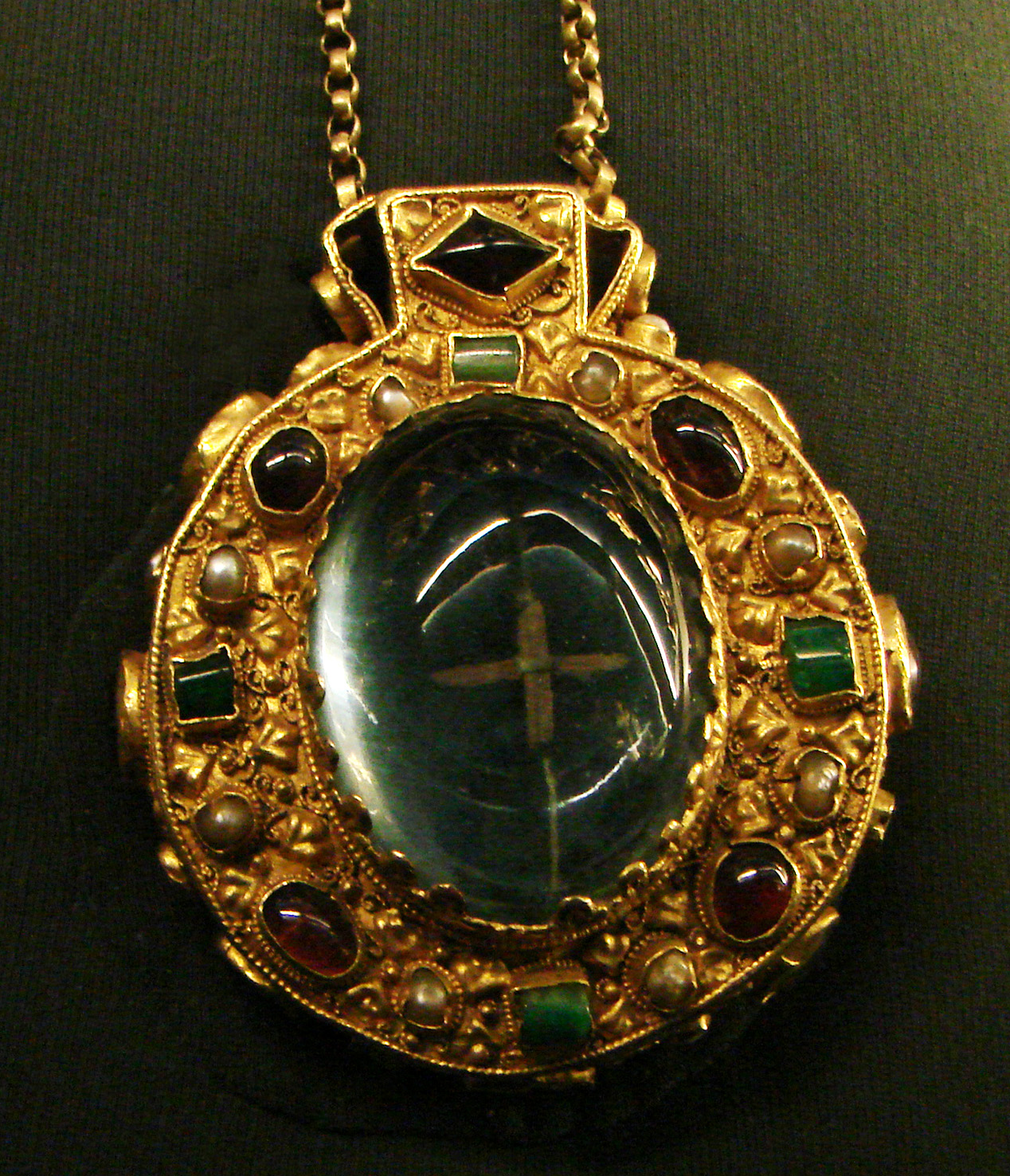
Talisman of Charlemagne, Musée du Palais du Tau, Rheims, with cross-shaped fragments of wood clearly visible under the central gemstone.

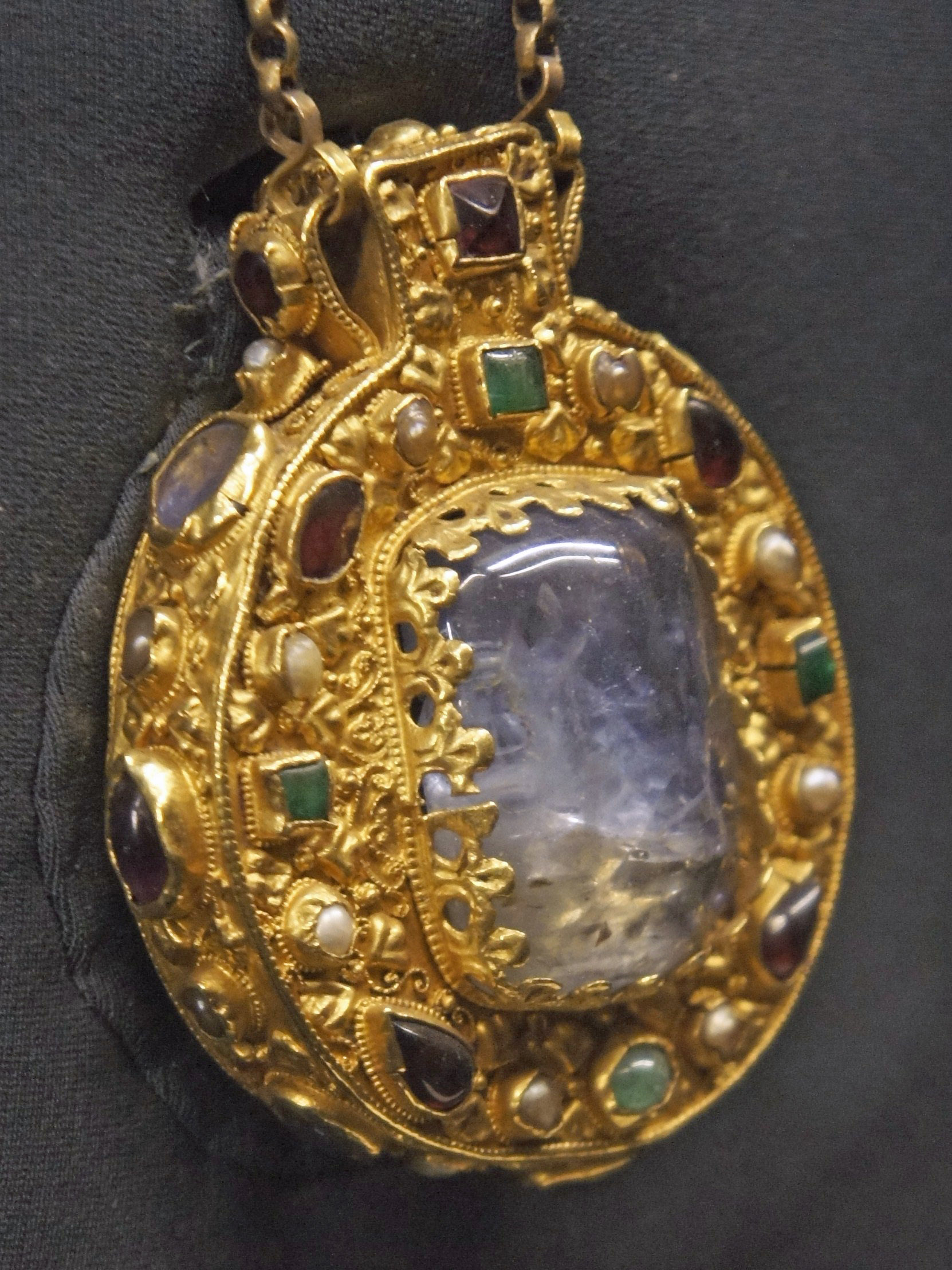
The reverse side of the talisman.

The Talisman of Charlemagne is a 9th-century Carolingian reliquary encolpion that may once have belonged to Charlemagne and is purported to contain a fragment of the True Cross. It is the only surviving piece of goldwork which can be connected with Charlemagne himself with some degree of probability, but the connection has been seriously questioned. The talisman is now kept in Reims in the Palace of Tau (inv.no. G 7).

== Description ==
The 7.3 cm long medallion is one of the few surviving items of goldsmithery from the ninth century AD. It is not really a piece of religious artwork, but a reliquary for personal purposes, an encolpion. Originally, it was set with two large sapphires in the centre, with the supposed hair of Mary between them, but in 1804 they were replaced with a piece of enamel glass. The talisman is covered in sumptuous gemstones and filigree work, but it lacks the figural depictions, coloured enamels, animal designs and interlace patterns which are common in older works. The work is thus dominated by the filigree work itself, along with pearls and jewels in box and palmette designs. Thus the arrow-shaped repoussé decorations between the filigree could recall motifs which were previously common. The shape of the amulet combines three different forms with their own meanings. Firstly, it mimicked the shape of the Palestinian pilgrims' ampules which had been particularly common in the west in the fifth and sixth centuries, and thereby indicated the origins of hair which it originally contained. Secondly, it uses four emeralds and a central stone to create the a cross, just like St. Stephen's Purse. Finally, the magnificent front serves as a frame for the relic visible behind the translucent gemstone. It is likely that it was used to heal or protect a high ranking individual.

== Contemporary significance ==
According to legend, the talisman was a gift from Caliph Harun al-Rashid to Charlemagne in 801. In fact, the reliquary appears to be a late work of Aachen in the time of Charlemagne, based on stylistic factors. It originally held hair purported to belong to the Virgin Mary.

Charlemagne's pre-eminent theologian, Alcuin (735-804) wrote in a letter to Archbishop Æthelhard of Canterbury, that he was trying to stop the emerging custom of wearing reliquaries around the neck, since it was "better to imitate the example of the saints with the heart than to carry their bones around in little sacks... this is a Pharisee superstition."

== Subsequent history ==
The talisman is meant to have been found around Charlemagne's neck when his tomb in Aachen Cathedral was opened by Emperor Otto III in the year 1000 or when it was opened by Frederick Barbarossa on 8 January 1166. The truth of this story is not clear. It would then have formed part of the Aachen cathedral treasury, but again there are many doubts about this because a medallion containing the hair of the Virgin Mary is not mentioned in the records until the 12th century. The connection to Charlemagne is mentioned for the first time in 1620.

Until 1804, the Talisman was kept in the Aachen Cathedral Treasury, but then Marc-Antoine Berdolet the first Bishop of Aachen gave it to the Empress Joséphine, wife of Napoleon Bonaparte, along with a bone fragment from Charlemagne's right arm, on the occasion of her visit to Aachen, during the procession of Corpus Christi on 9 December 1804. The gift was offered in order to thank Napoleon for returning the relics of the cathedral which had been confiscated during the French Revolution. She gave it to her daughter Hortense, who passed it in turn to her son, Napoleon III. At the fall of the Second French Empire, Empress Eugénie entrusted it to Henri Conneau who hid it in a wall of his house and transmitted it to her in England. In 1919 it passed to the Archbishop of Rheims, Cardinal Louis Luçon, who placed it in the church treasury of the Abbey of Saint-Remi. The exchange of the hair of Mary for a piece of the True Cross may have taken place in this period.

== Bibliography ==
- Franz Kaufmann: Vom Talisman Karls des Großen. Kanonikus Anton Joseph Blees und der Aachener Münsterschatz zur Zeit der französischen Revolution. Zwei Abhandlungen zur Geschichte des Münsterschatzes. Creutzer, Aachen 1920.
- Blaise de Montesquiou-Fezensac: "Le Talisman de Charlemagne." Art de France 2, 1962, pp. 68–76.
- Jean Taleron: "Le talisman de Charlemagne." Les monuments historiques de la France 12, 1966, pp. 24–43.
- Ernst Günther Grimme: Goldschmiedekunst im Mittelalter. Form und Bedeutung des Reliquiars von 800 bis 1500. M. DuMont Schauberg, Köln 1972, ISBN 978-3-7701-0669-1, pp. 21–23.
- Ernst Günther Grimme (Text), Ann Münchow (Recordings): Der Aachener Domschatz (= Aachener Kunstblätter. Vol. 42). Schwann, Düsseldorf 1973, No. 7, pp. 14–15.
- Christoph Winterer, "«Das Wort Gottes, in ruhmvollem Glanz blinkend». Kunst im Umkreis Karls des Großen." in Michael Imhof, Christoph Winterer: Karl der Große. Leben und Wirkung, Kunst und Architektur. Imhof, Petersberg 2013, ISBN 978-3-932526-61-9, pp. 76–117, on p. 104.
- Georg Minkenberg, Sisi Ben Kayed: Verlorene Schätze. Ehemalige Schatzstücke aus dem Aachener Domschatz. Schnell & Steiner, Regensburg 2014, ISBN 978-3-7954-2834-1, p. 20.
- Thomas Labusiak: "»Er schenkte der Kirche viele heilige Gefäße aus Gold und Silber.« Goldschmiedekunst in der Zeit Karls des Großen." In Peter van den Brink, Sarvenaz Ayooghi (Ed.): Karl der Große – Charlemagne. Karls Kunst. Katalog der Sonderausstellung Karls Kunst vom 20. Juni bis 21. September 2014 im Centre Charlemagne, Aachen. Sandstein, Dresden 2014, ISBN 978-3-95498-093-2, pp. 75–93, at pp. 90–92.
