= Ruspoli Sapphire =

Blue sapphire

The Ruspoli Sapphire, also known as the Wooden Spoon Seller's Sapphire, is a 136.9 carat (27.38 g) blue sapphire that has historically been confused with Grand Sapphire of Louis XIV (which has also been called the Ruspoli Sapphire or Wooden Spoon Seller's Sapphire). Recent research has shown that not only are these two separate gems, but also that the story of once being owned by the Ruspoli family and having been acquired from a wooden spoon seller in Bengal are both apocryphal tales with no basis. The origins of this confusion stem from a book published in 1858 by Charles Barbot, who confused the Ruspoli Sapphire with the Grand Sapphire of Louis XIV.

The known history of this sapphire begins with a French jeweler named Perret, who sold it to a jeweler from Milan named Antonio Fusi around 1811. A dispute over the sale was settled by a court-ordered auction in 1813, leaving a clear paper trail of this gem's history. From there it passed through the hands of a well-known Parisian jeweler named David Achard who then apparently sold it to Henry Philip Hope (of the Hope Diamond fame). From there it passed into the Russian Crown Jewels and then to Queen Marie of Romania. Her daughter sold it to a "famed New York jeweler" in 1950, and its whereabouts from that point on are unknown.

== See also ==
- List of individual gemstones
- List of sapphires by size
