= Vishnu Madav Ghatage =

Indian aeronautical engineer

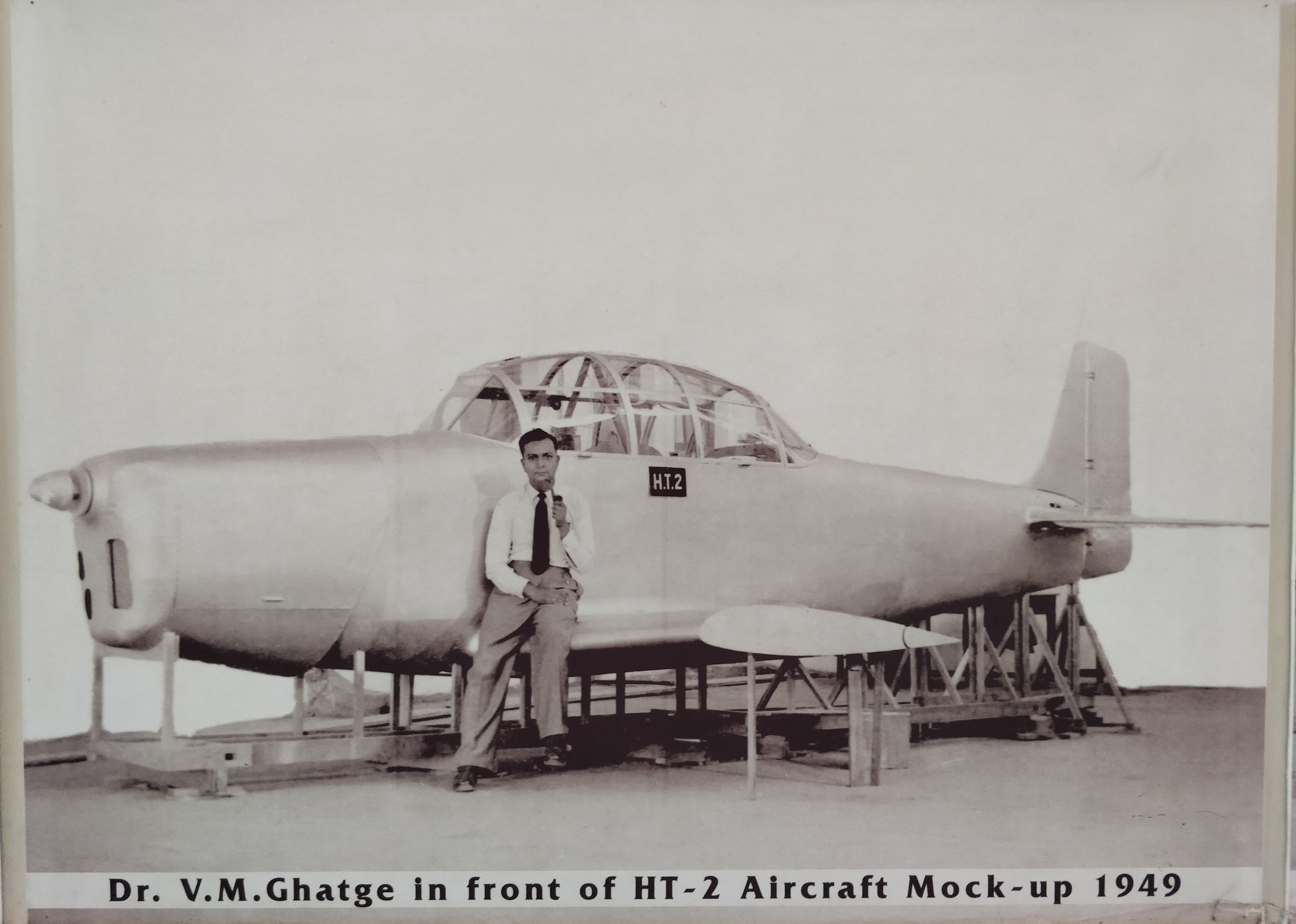
- Photograph of a 1949 photograph of Dr. V. M. Ghatge displayed at HAL Museum, Bengaluru
- Born: 24 October 1908; Hasur, Kolhapur State, British Raj (now in Maharashtra, India)
- Died: 6 December 1991 (aged 83); Bengaluru, Karnataka, India
- Occupation: Aeronautical engineer
- Years active: 1936 - 1991
- Known for: Aeronautical engineering
- Awards: Padma Shri; National Design Award; Sir Walter Pucky Prize

Vishnu Madav Ghatage (24 October 1908 – 6 December 1991) was an Indian aeronautical engineer, known for his pioneering conceptual and engineering contributions to Indian aeronautics. He led the team which designed and developed HAL HT-2, the first Indian designed and built aircraft. He was honoured by the Government of India in 1965, with the award of Padma Shri, the fourth highest Indian civilian award for his services to the nation.

== Biography ==
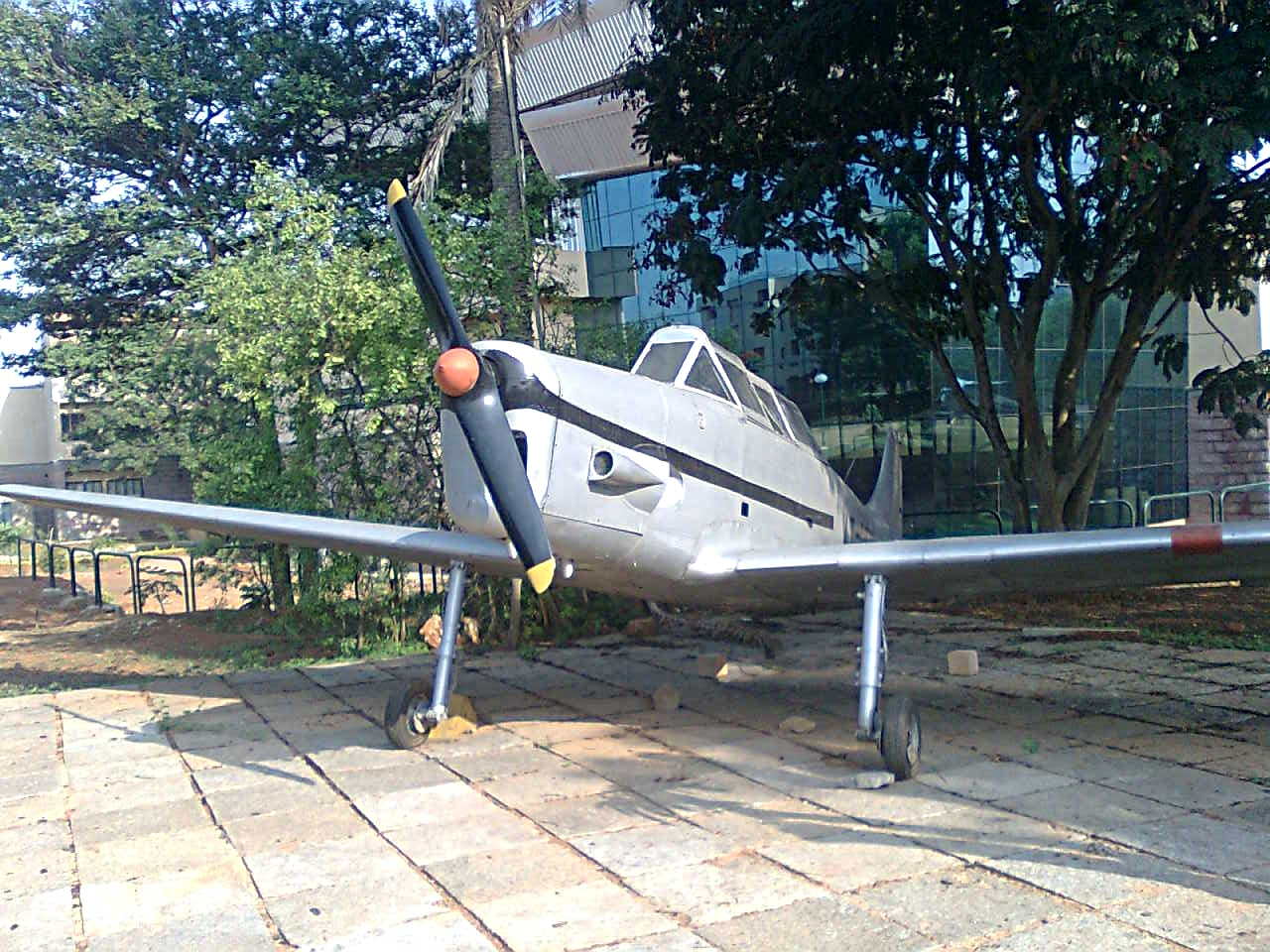
HAL HT-2 at IISc, Bangalore

Vishnu Madav Ghatage was born on 24 October 1908 at Hasur, a small village in the princely state of Kolhapur, now in the western Indian state of Maharashtra. His early schooling was at Kolhapur after which he graduated (BSc) from Sir Parshurambhau College, Pune and joined Institute of Science, Mumbai (formerly known as Royal Institute of Science) for post graduate studies. He passed MSc from there with distinction which made him eligible for scholarship for overseas studies. After completing his post graduate thesis on Formation of Vortex from Colaba Observatory, he joined Kaiser Wilhelm Society, Göttingen in 1933 for doctoral research on Model experiments for the relative motion of air columns of different temperature under the guidance of Ludwig Prandtl and secured a doctoral degree (DPhil) in 1936. His research was funded by the Gliding Society of Germany as his thesis was related to cumulus clouds, a subject of interest to the sport of gliding.

In 1936, Ghatage returned to India and worked as a professor at the University of Pune and at the University of Mumbai for four years. He joined Hindustan Aeronautics Limited (HAL) in 1940 for a two-year stint and moved to the Indian Institute of Science, Bengaluru (IISC) in 1942 as a professor to establish post graduate courses in aeronautical engineering and taught fluid dynamics, solid mechanics and aircraft design and organised wind tunnel experiments there till 1948. He returned to HAL that year as the chief designer and was involved with aircraft design and development till 1967 reaching the post of a deputy director. He retired from HAL as its general manager and managing director in 1970.

Post retirement, he was involved with his private venture, Designers Private Limited, a Bangalore-based engineering design firm. Known to be a golf enthusiast, he helped found the Karnataka Golf Association and was its founder vice president. Ghatage died, aged 81, in Bengaluru on 6 December 1991 succumbing to cancer.

== Legacy and honours ==
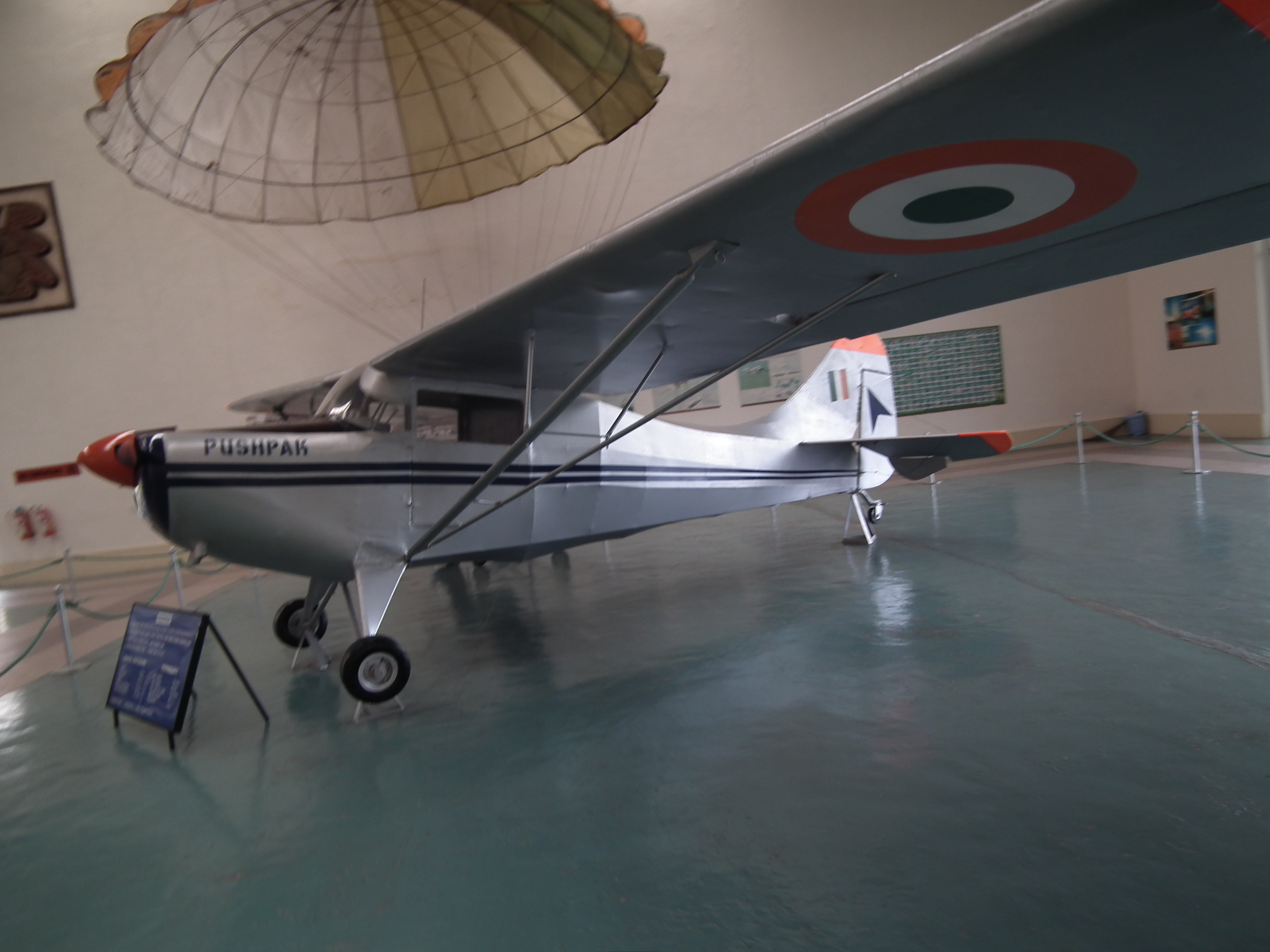
HAL Pushpak at HAL Museum

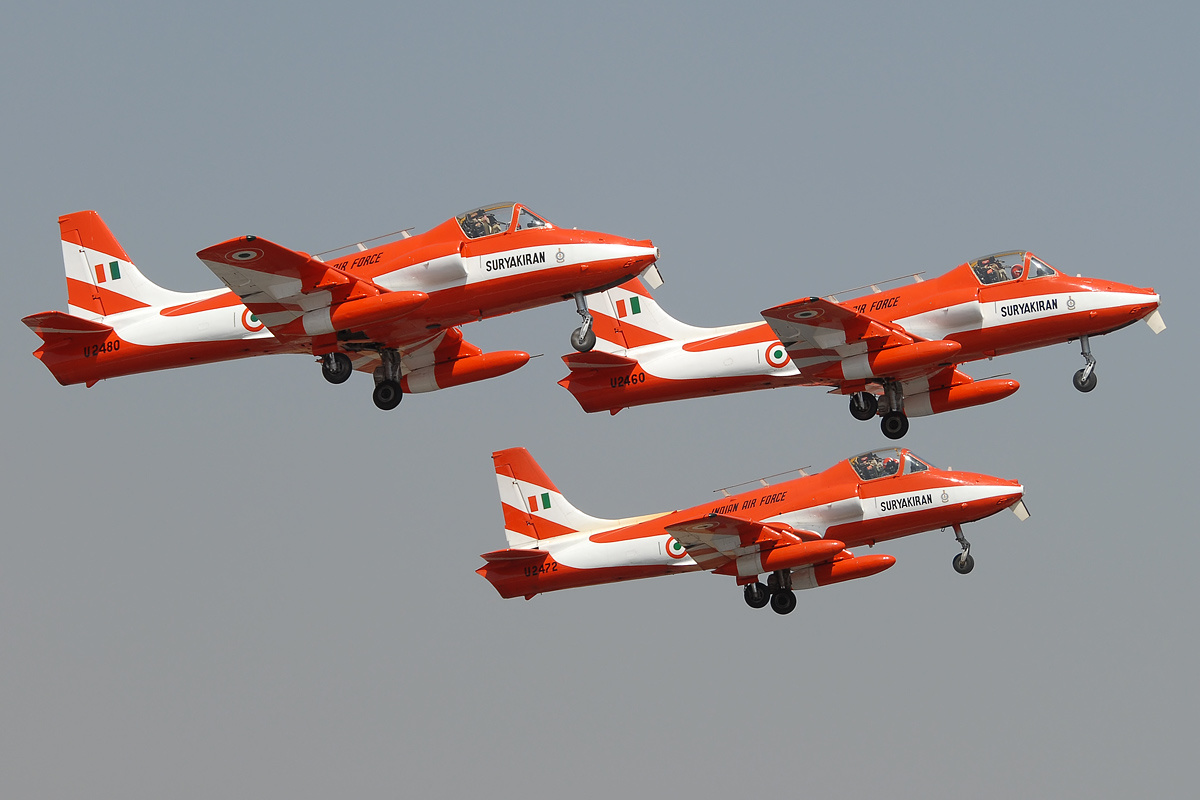
HAL Kiran.

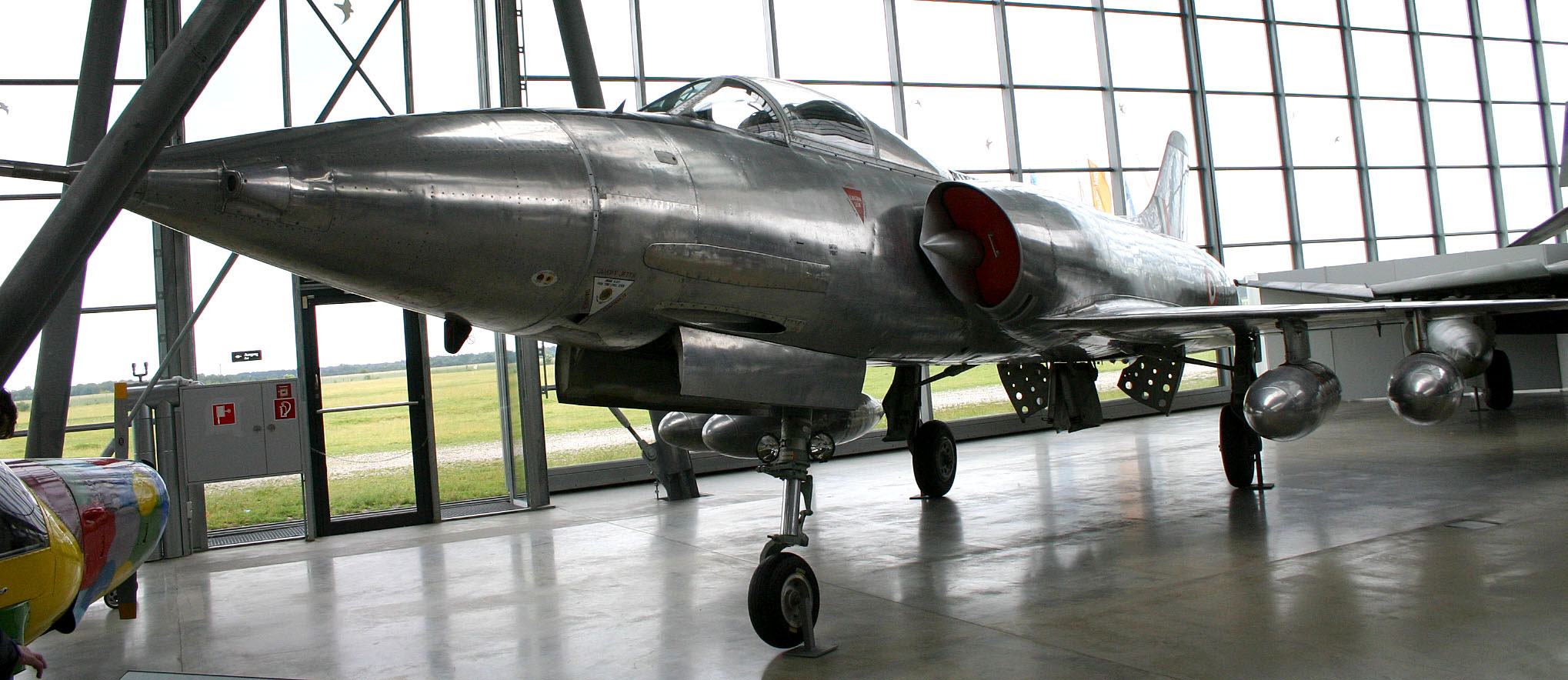
HAL Marut.

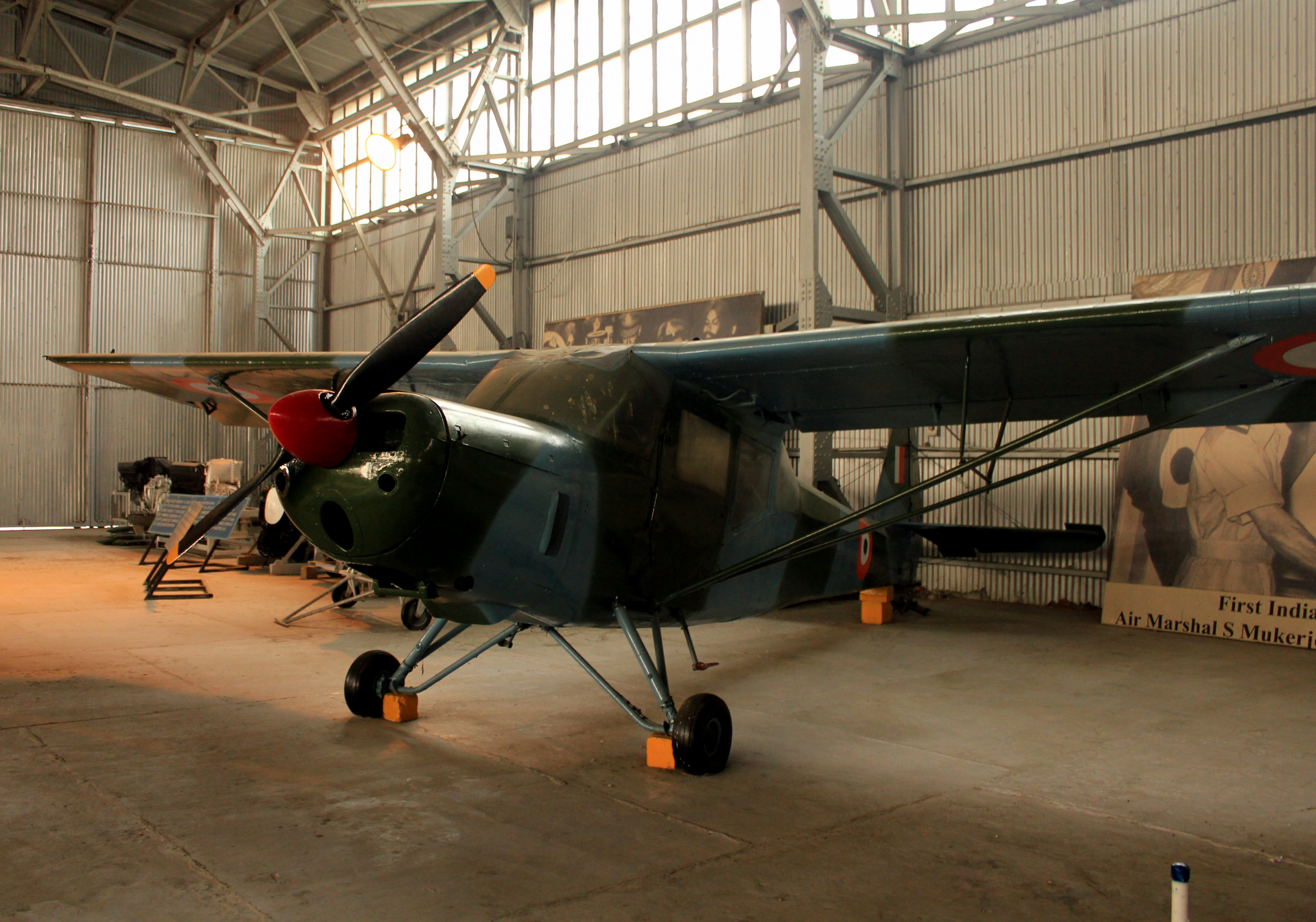
HAL Krishak.

After joining HAL, Ghatage was entrusted with the responsibility of developing a glider and he developed a troop-carrying glider. This was followed by the design and development of HAL HT-2, a trainer aircraft and the first Indian designed and developed aircraft. The next project was HAL Pushpak, a piston engine twin seater aircraft which was followed by HAL Kiran, a jet trainer for the Indian Air Force. Later, he developed the prototype of the HAL Marut, a 2500 lb thrust straight jet engine aircraft. However, this project was later entrusted to Kurt Wolfgang Tank, a German aerospace engineer and Ghatage's team was moved to Germany to assist Tank. By the time the project was accomplished, Ghatage had retired from HAL. He was also behind the development of HAL Krishak, a small aircraft used for agricultural purposes.

Ghatage, credited with modernising the Indian aircraft industry, was the founder Head of the Department of Aeronautical Engineering at the Indian Institute of Science and was known to have inspired many young Indian aerospace engineers like Roddam Narasimha during his teaching days there. His contributions were also reported in the establishment of the National Aerospace Laboratories, the second largest aerospace laboratory facility in India.

== Awards and honours ==
Ghatage was an elected Fellow of the Indian Academy of Sciences (1945), the Indian National Science Academy (1950), the Aeronautical Society of India, the Royal Aeronautical Society of London and the National Institute of Sciences, India. He was a member of the Institution of Engineers (India), the American Institute of Aeronautics and Astronautics, USA and the Maharashtra Academy of Sciences.

Ghatage was a recipient of the National Design Award from the Government of India. In 1965, the government followed it up with the fourth highest Indian civilian award of Padma Shri. Four years later, he received Sir Walter Pucky Prize. HAL, Indian Institute of Science and the Aeronautical Society of India jointly honoured him on his 75th birthday by holding a seminar on Design and Development in Aeronautics.

== See also ==
- HAL HT-2
- HAL Pushpak
- HAL Kiran
- HAL Marut
- HAL Krishak
- Hindustan Aeronautics Limited
- Indian Institute of Science
- Kaiser Wilhelm Society
