= Pratap Singh Rao Gaekwad =

Maharaja of Baroda from 1939 to 1968

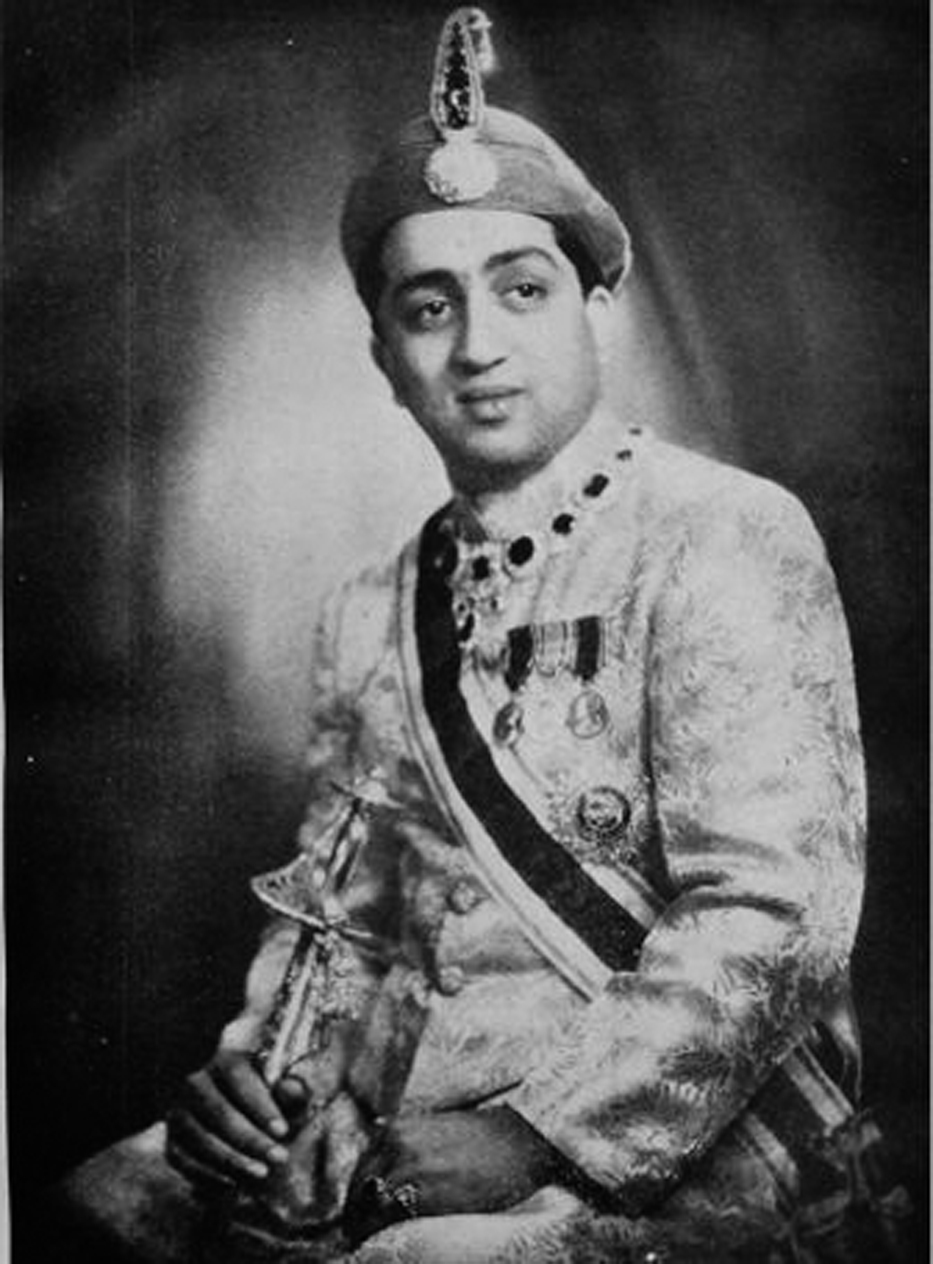

Maharaja of Baroda
- Reign: 6 February 1939 – 12 April 1951
- Predecessor: Sayajirao Gaekwad III
- Successor: Fatehsinghrao Gaekwad II
- Born: 29 June 1908
- Died: 19 July 1968 (aged 60)
- Consort: Maharani Shanta Devi Sahib; Princess Sita Devi of Pithapuram
- Issue: Fatehsinghrao Gaekwad II; Mrunalini Raje Gaekwad; Premila Raje Gaekwad; Sarala Raje Gaekwad; Vasundharadevi Raje Gaekwad; Ranjitsinhrao Gaekwad; Lalitadevi Raje Gaekwad; Sangramsinhrao Gaekwad; Sayajirao Gaekwad
- Dynasty: Gaekwad
- Father: Yuvraj Fatehsinhrao Gaekwad
- Mother: Padmavati Bai Sahiba
- Religion: Hinduism

Shrimant Maharaja Sir Pratap Singh Rao Gaekwad (29 June 1908 – 19 July 1968), who belonged to the Gaekwad dynasty of the Marathas, was the ruling Maharaja of Baroda. He succeeded to the throne upon the death of his grandfather Sayajirao Gaekwad III in 1939. In 1947, British India was partitioned into two independent dominions, and Pratap Singh acceded his state to the Dominion of India. By 1949, Baroda had been merged into India.

Pratap Singh retained his title and certain privileges, but in 1951 he was deposed by the government of India for allegedly irresponsible behavior. He then retired to Europe with his second wife, Princess Sita Devi of Pithapuram, and settled in Monaco. He died in 1968 and was succeeded by his eldest son, Fatehsinghrao Gaekwad, who had been officiating as Maharaja since 1951.

Pratap Singh founded the Maharaja Sayajirao University of Baroda in 1949, as per the wishes of his grandfather, Sayajirao, and settled the "Sir Sayajirao Diamond Jubilee and Memorial Trust", which still exists, providing for the educational and other needs of the people of the former Baroda State.

== Biography ==
He inherited an estate that was conservatively valued in excess of $US300 million (in 1939 dollars), which included an assortment of jewellery with an estimated value of $US15 million. He went on a 1948 six-week tour of the United States, where he and his second wife were welcomed into the salons of high society. They spent a reported $US10 million during their visit to America. The Indian government did an audit of Baroda's treasury after the widely read news reports, and concluded that the Gaekwad had taken several interest-free loans from Baroda's treasury which they considered inappropriate. He agreed to pay the money back in yearly installments from his income of $US8 million.

When British India gained independence from Britain as two new dominions, both sought to take control of the princely states, which were technically private domains of the princes. The British withdrawal from India left a vacuum, with the British releasing the princes from their subsidiary alliances. However, most of the princely states were militarily weak, and within about a year pressure from the new countries of India and Pakistan had resulted in most of the maharajas and other princes acceding to one of the two. Pratap Singh was so distraught after he signed the Instrument of Accession for Baroda that he wept in the arms of V. P. Menon.

== Family ==
His father was Fatehsinghhrao Gaekwad and his mother was Padmavati Bai Saheba. His father was heir apparent, but died at the age of 23 before he could ascend to the throne. Fatehsinghrao's father, Sayajirao Gaekwad III, abstained from alcohol, but Fatehsinghrao was a heavy drinker, which may have contributed to his early death. Sayajirao was disappointed in his son's mediocre academic performance, which he attributed to his children having so much wealth and too few goals.

=== Marriages and children ===
Pratapsinghhrao married twice. In 1929, he married Shantadevi (1914–2002), the daughter of Sardar Mansinhrao Subbarao Ghorpade of Hasur, in Kolhapur state. The couple had three sons and five daughters:

1. Fatehsinghrao Gaekwad II (2 April 1930 – 1 September 1988), who succeeded as the Maharaja of Baroda. He married the only daughter of Maharaja Umaid Singh of Jodhpur. They did not have children, and therefore his brother Ranjitsingh succeeded him as Maharaja of Baroda.
2. Mrunalini Raje Gaekwad (25 June 1931 – 1 January 2015). Was given in marriage to Maharaja Anandrao II Puar of Dhar.
3. Premila Raje Gaekwad (17 April 1933 – present). She was given in marriage to the Darbar Sahib (ruling prince) of Jasdan state in Kathiawar, a former Kathi Kshatriya state. She has one daughter and one son, the present Durbar Sahib of Jasdan, who is married to the daughter of Premila's brother Ranjitsinh, Maharaja of Baroda (see below)
4. Sarala Raje Gaekwad (1935–present). Renamed Sattvashila Raje Bhonsle upon her wedding, she was given in marriage to her first cousin, Raja Shivram Sawant Bhonsle, ruler of Sawantwadi state, who is the son of her father's sister. She has one son, the present Raja of Sawantwadi, and one daughter.
5. Vasundharadevi Raje Gaekwad (4 October 1936 – present). She was given in marriage to the Raja of Sandur in Karnataka, Raja Murarrao Yeshwantrao Ghorpade, who was at one time a minister in the Karnataka government. She has three sons and one daughter, including the present Raja of Sandur.
6. Ranjitsinhrao Gaekwad (8 May 1938 – 9 May 2012), who succeeded his brother as the Maharaja of Baroda. Married to a daughter of the Jadhav family, who are nobles of Gwalior state, he had one son, Samarjitsinh Gaekwad, who succeeded him as titular Maharaja of Baroda, and two daughters. The elder daughter is married to her cousin the ruler of Jasdan in Kathiawar (see above), while the younger daughter has been married twice. Her first husband was Uraaz Bahl, a nephew of the socialite Parmeshwar Godrej, and her second husband is a Bengali corporate executive settled in New Zealand.
7. Lalitadevi Raje Gaekwad (3 December 1939 – 1 March 2010). Was given in marriage to Dr. Amritrao Kirdatt of Dhamtari in Chhattisgarh, a Maratha nobleman. She has five children, being in order of birth Aditya Kirdutt, Kavita Mohite (daughter), Sarita Shreyas (daughter), Shailesh Kirdatt and Chirayu Kirdatt.
8. Sangramsinhrao Gaekwad (6 August 1941 – present). Married Asha Rajyalakshmi Devi (born 1946), fourth daughter of Arjun Shamsher Jang Bahadur Rana of the Rana family of Nepal. He has one son and one daughter:
  1. Pratapsinhrao Sangramsinhrao Gaekwad (26 August 1971 – present). He married Praggyashri, youngest daughter of Pyar Jung Thapa, former COAS of the Royal Nepal Army, and a member of the Rana family of Nepal; no issue.
  2. Priyadarshini Raje (1975–), the present Maharani of Gwalior, as wife of Jyotiraditya Scindia, Maharaja of Gwalior. She had one son and one daughter.

In the early 1940s, Pratapsinhrao fell in love with a married woman, Sita Devi, a daughter of Maharajah Rao Venkata Kumara Mahipati Surya Rau Maharaja of Pitapuram, who was already married to the Raja of Vuyyur and a mother of three children. He married her in 1943, after she had secured a divorce from her husband. This was in defiance of the anti-bigamy laws that his grandfather had imposed.

The couple had one son, Sayajirao Gaekwad (8 March 1945 – 8 May 1985), who died unmarried.

== Titles ==
- 1908-1919: Shrimant Pratapsinhrao Gaekwad
- 1919-1939: Shrimant Yuvaraja Pratapsinhrao Gaekwad, Yuvaraj Sahib of Baroda
- 1939-1941: His Highness Farzand-i-Khas-i-Daulat-i-Inglishia, Shrimant Maharaja Pratapsinhrao Gaekwad, Sena Khas Khel Shamsher Bahadur, Maharaja of Baroda
- 1941-1943: His Highness Farzand-i-Khas-i-Daulat-i-Inglishia, Shrimant Maharaja Sir Pratapsinhrao Gaekwad, Sena Khas Khel Shamsher Bahadur, Maharaja of Baroda, GCIE
- 1943-1944: Major His Highness Farzand-i-Khas-i-Daulat-i-Inglishia, Shrimant Maharaja Sir Pratapsinhrao Gaekwad, Sena Khas Khel Shamsher Bahadur, Maharaja of Baroda, GCIE
- 1944-1945: Lieutenant-Colonel His Highness Farzand-i-Khas-i-Daulat-i-Inglishia, Shrimant Maharaja Sir Pratapsinhrao Gaekwad, Sena Khas Khel Shamsher Bahadur, Maharaja of Baroda, GCIE
- 1945-1946: Colonel His Highness Farzand-i-Khas-i-Daulat-i-Inglishia, Shrimant Maharaja Sir Pratapsinhrao Gaekwad, Sena Khas Khel Shamsher Bahadur, Maharaja of Baroda, GCIE
- 1946-1968: Major-General His Highness Farzand-i-Khas-i-Daulat-i-Inglishia, Shrimant Maharaja Sir Pratapsinhrao Gaekwad, Sena Khas Khel Shamsher Bahadur, Maharaja of Baroda, GCIE

== Honours ==
- Baroda Golden Jubilee Medal-1926
- King George V Silver Jubilee Medal-1935
- Baroda Diamond Jubilee Medal-1936
- King George VI Coronation Medal-1937
- Knight Grand Commander of the Order of the Indian Empire (GCIE)-1941
- Indian Independence Medal-1947
Maharajah of Baroda presenting shield at RAF Camp Baroda in January 1946.

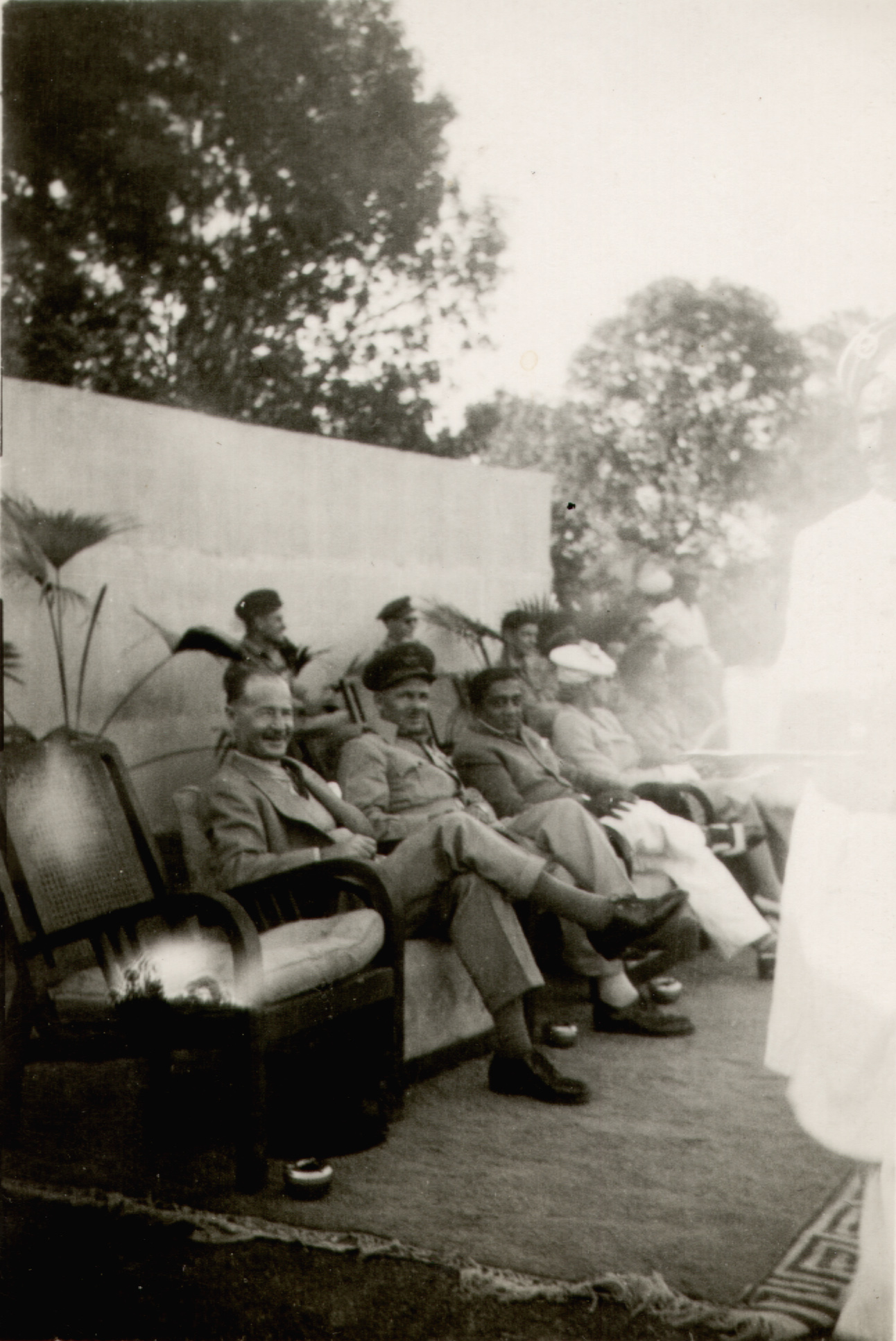
Maharajah of Baroda (third from lef) at RAF Camp Baroda in January 1946.

== See also ==
- Sita Devi (Maharani of Baroda)
- Kirti Mandir, Vadodara

Pratap Singh Rao Gaekwad Gaekwad dynasty Born: 29 June 1908 Died: 19 July 1968
Regnal titles
Preceded by Sayajirao Gaekwad III	Maharaja of Baroda; 1939–1951	Succeeded by Fatehsinghrao Gaekwad
