= Sangramsinh Gaekwad =

Indian cricketer and coach

Personal information
- Full name: Sangramsinh Pratapsinh Gaekwad
- Born: 6 August 1941 (age 85); Baroda, Gujarat, India
- Batting: Right-handed
- Relatives: See Gaekwad dynasty

Domestic team information
- Years: Team
- 1960/61–1975/76: Baroda

Career statistics
Competition	First-class
Matches	77
Runs scored	3,534
Batting average	27.60
100s/50s	3/16
Top score	138
Balls bowled	130
Wickets	3
Bowling average	35.66
5 wickets in innings	0
10 wickets in match	0
Best bowling	2/4
Catches/stumpings	27/–
- Source: ESPNcricinfo, 8 September 2019

Sangramsinh Pratapsinh Gaekwad (born 6 August 1941) is an Indian former first-class cricketer and cricket coach. He is a member of the Gaekwad dynasty of Baroda and currently first in the line of succession to the unofficial title (Note: The Government of India abolished all official titles, privileges and remuneration of princely states in 1971 through the 26th amendment to the Constitution of India) of Maharaja of Baroda.

== Early life and family ==
Sangramsinh was born on 6 August 1941 as the eighth child of Pratap Singh Rao Gaekwad, the last ruling Maharaja of Baroda, and his first wife Shantadevi. He has two brothers, Fatehsinghrao Gaekwad and Ranjitsinh Gaekwad, and five sisters.

Sangramsinh's brothers, Fatehsinghrao and Ranjitsinh, became unofficial Maharajas of Baroda after their father's death. After Ranjitsinh's death in 2012, Ranjitsinh's only son, Samarjitsinh Gaekwad, ascended to the throne. In 2013, Samarjitsinh and Sangramsinh settled a 23-year-long legal inheritance dispute worth more than ₹20,000 crore (equivalent to ₹370 billion or US$4.0 billion in 2026) (~ US$3 billion in 2013).

As part of the settlement, Sangramsinh received ownership of Nazarbaug Palace, Indumati Palace, Makarpura Palace, two bungalows in Vadodara, real estate properties in Mumbai, 55 acres (22 ha) of land in the vicinity of Laxmi Vilas Palace, and 100 acres (40 ha) of agricultural land. He also secured control of Alaukik Trading Company and Baroda Rayon facility in Surat, and retained possession of Gaekwad Investment Corporation.

== Personal life ==
Sangramsinh is married to Asharaje Gaekwad who is from a Nepali noble family; the couple lives in Mumbai and has two children. Their son Pratapsinhrao Gaekwad is the CEO of Baroda Rayon while daughter Priyadarshini Raje is married to politician Jyotiraditya Scindia of the Scindia family.

== Cricket career ==
Sangramsinh played first-class cricket for Baroda in the Ranji Trophy from 1960/61 to 1975/76. He appeared in 77 first-class matches as a top-order batsman, scoring 3,534 runs at an average of 27.60. He also played for West Zone in the Duleep Trophy and Board President's XI against visiting international teams.

Sangramsinh became a cricket coach after his playing career. In 2015, he started a cricket academy in Vadodara called "Prince Sangramsinh Gaekwad Cricket Academy". The academy, spread over 10 acres near the Akota-Dandia Bazaar Bridge, began operations with former Baroda cricketer Narayan Satham as its head coach.
