= Nazarbaug Palace =

Building in India

Coordinates: 22.3007°N 73.2115°E

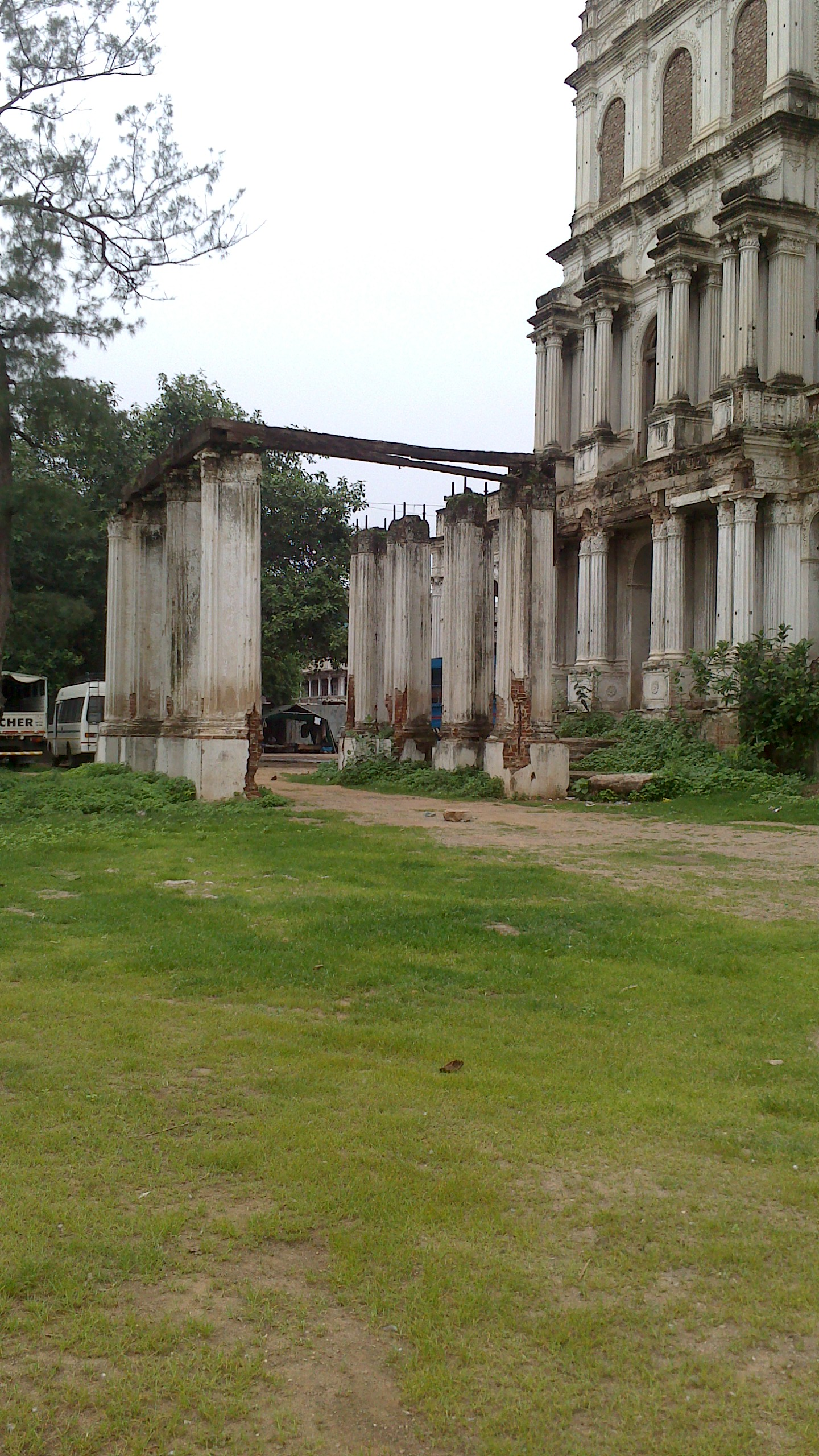
The palace in 2012

Nazarbaug Palace or Nazar Bāgh Palace was the Gaekwad's royal palace in the city of Vadodara, Gujarat state, western India. Located in the heart of the city, the palace was built by Malhar Rao Gaekwad in 1871. Considered to be the oldest palace in Baroda, in its later years it was used as a treasury and was still the first choice of the royal family for conducting large-scale ceremonies, including the coronation of Sir Sayajirao Gaekwad III.

The Palace had a classic look, so in Gujarati it was told about its look as 'Nazar Na Laage' (may it be protected from the evil eye) from which it was named Nazar. The Palace also had beautiful garden from which its name included "baug". So it was named as Nazarbaug Palace.

== The Building ==
Built in the Italian-Renaissance style, the palace was a towering structure with four storeys and a basement, along with a gazebo in the gardens. Built on a high platform formed by the basement below, with small flight of steps leading to the entrance. The sizes of the successive storeys decreased in size and formed verandahs and balconies on every floor.

Each floor was distinguished using elaborately decorated architraves featuring stucco work. All the walls of the building were divided into symmetrical sections using elements such as pilasters and belt course. These sections were then inscribed with arched windows. Elements of classical architecture such as fluted columns of Corinthian order, arcaded verandahs, pedimented windows, balustraded parapets and blind arcade embellished every façade of the building.

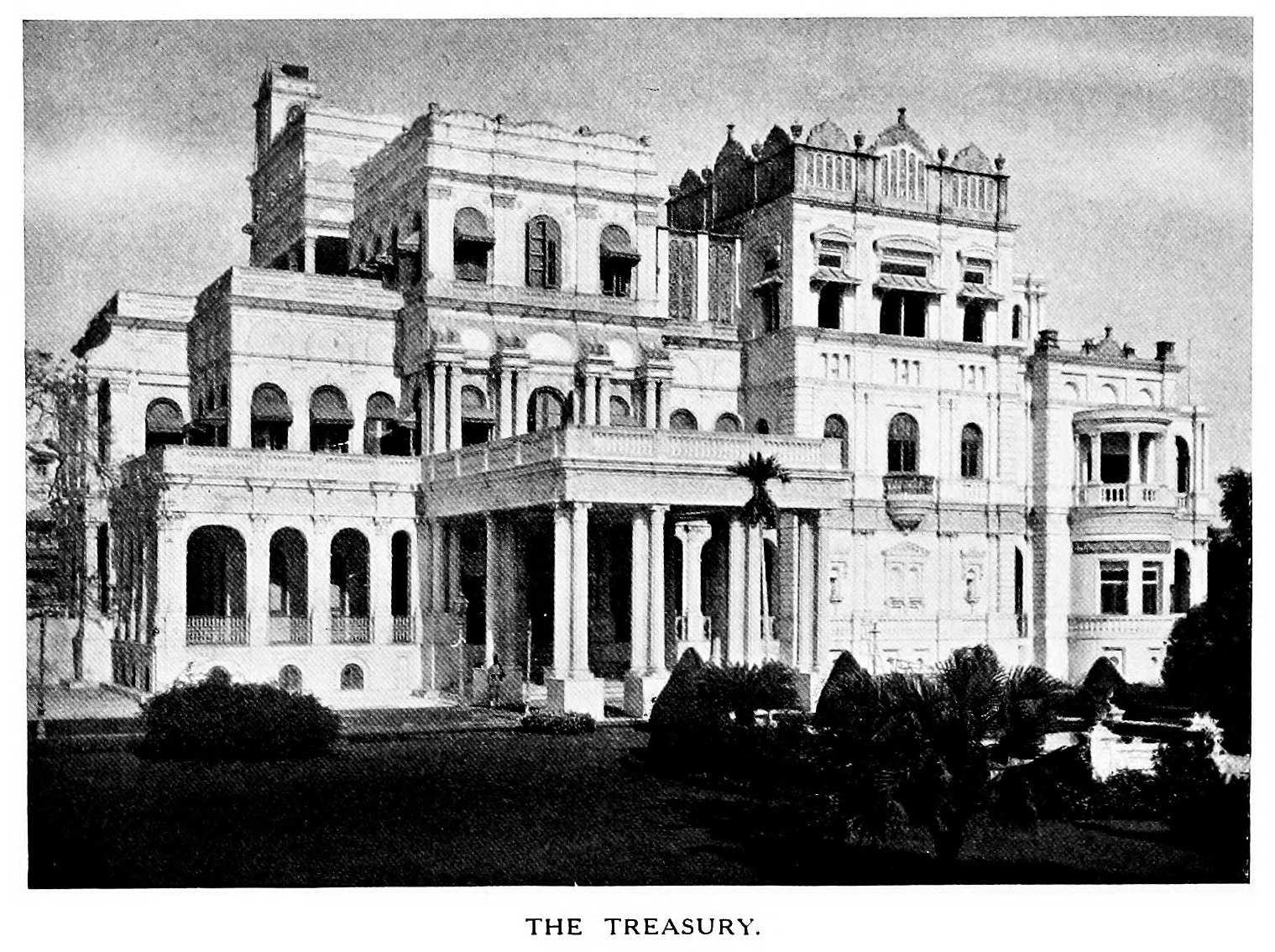
Nazarbaug Palace Treasury Building, Baroda State

== The Treasury ==
Till recently, it housed the royal family heirlooms. It had solid gold and silver guns, each barrel weighing over 100 kg. The white-stucco palace was the depository of the jewels of the Gaekwad family, and in 1927 the collection was believed to be worth $10,000,000 at the time, including a diamond necklace which carried both the Star of the South diamond, weight around 125 carats, and the English Dresden.

An important part of the collection was the famed Pearl Carpet of Baroda, set with precious stones, diamonds and seed pearls and was meant as an offering to the tomb of prophet Muhammed. Other displays of the palace were works by artists like Raphael, Titian and Bartolomé Esteban Murillo. Many of these valuables were stolen from inside the palace.

== Present Condition ==
The palace was in a state of ruin and did not reflect its former glory. The inside was ripped out after an alleged robbery. The grounds were used as a car park. Visitors were allowed to walk around but not allowed to take photos.

In October, 2014, the palace was completely razed with only rubble and some parts of the floor remaining. As of now, a shopping mall of the same name stands in its place.
