= Hasur =

Hasur could refer to the following:

- Hasur, Iran, a village in Isfahan Province, Iran
- Hasur, Maharashtra, a village in India
- Hasur, Syria, a village in Homs Governorate, Syria
