= Coster Diamonds =

Dutch diamond polishing factory

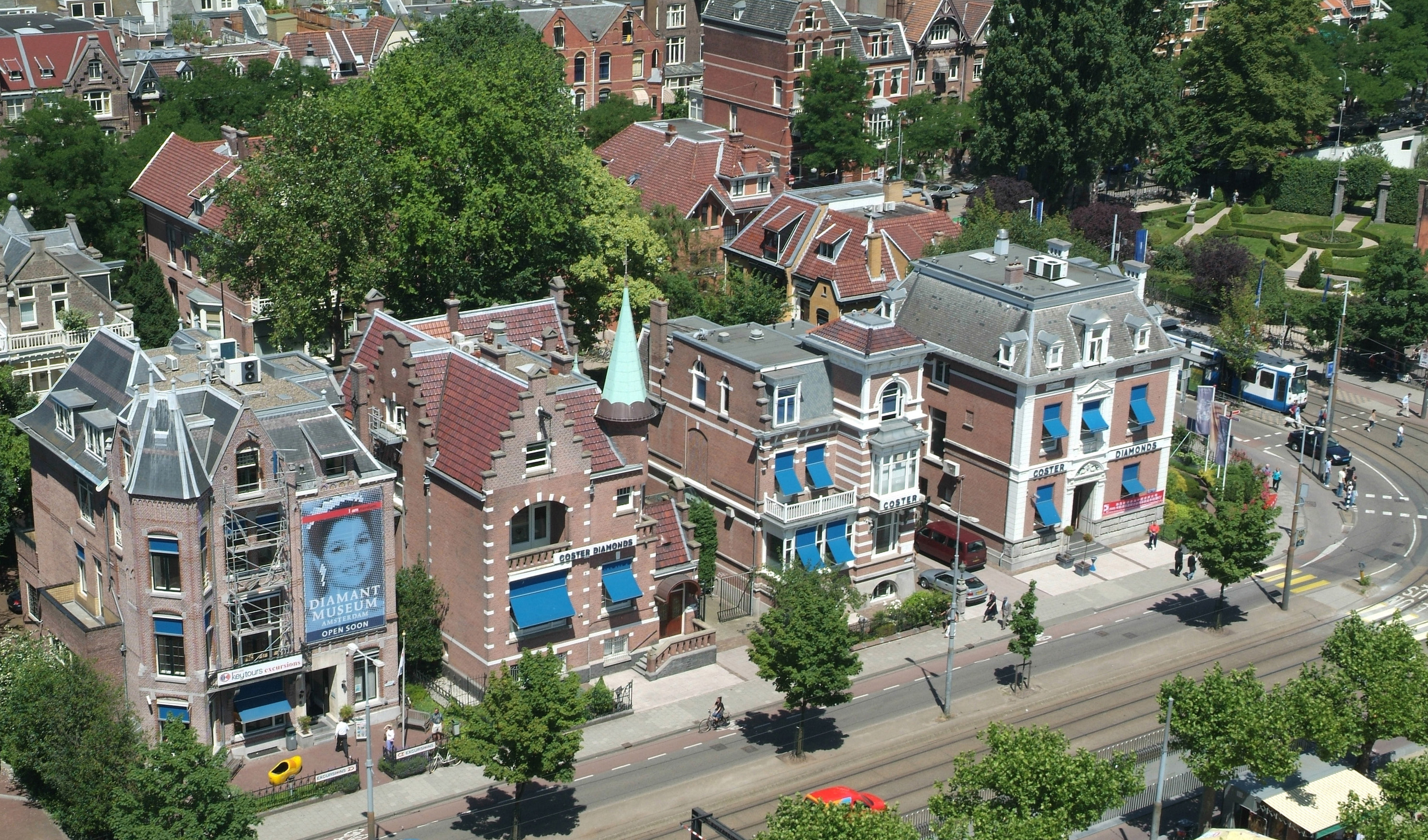
Aerial Photo of Royal Coster Diamonds

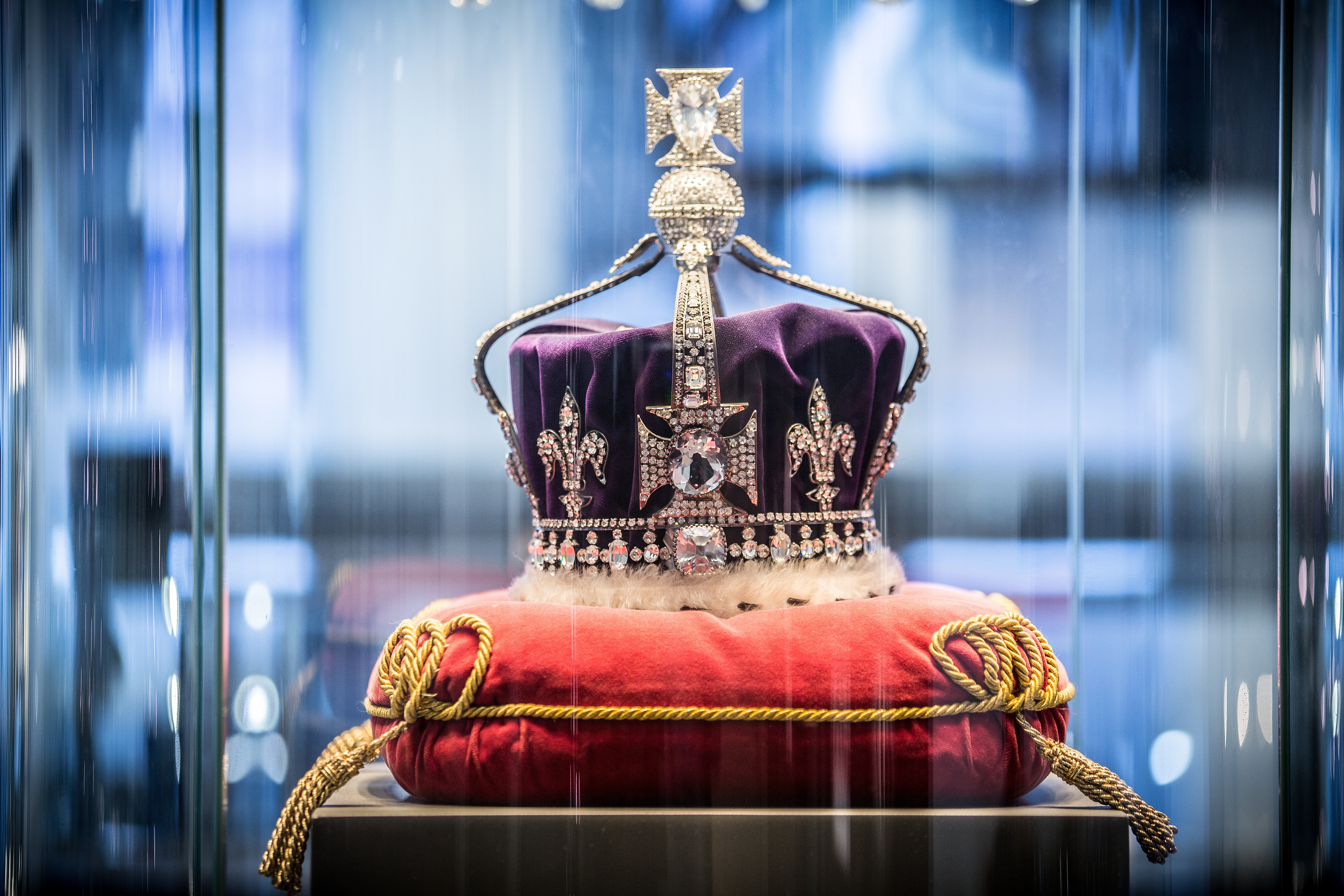
Replica of the Crown of Queen Elizabeth the Queen Mother, which holds the Koh-i-Noor diamond

Royal Coster Diamonds is a diamond polishing factory in Amsterdam, Netherlands. Founded in 1840, it is the oldest in the world, and has handled a number of historical masterpieces. For example, it re-polished the Koh-i-Noor, which is mounted in the British Crown of Queen Elizabeth the Queen Mother and the Dresden Green Diamond, held in the New Green Vault at Dresden Castle.

== History ==
- 1840: Moses Elias Coster, diamond cutter in Amsterdam, founds Royal Coster Diamonds in a factory building at the Waterlooplein in Amsterdam.
- 1848: Son Meijer Moses Coster (Martin) succeeds his father. He leaves for Paris for new business.
- 1910: Felix Theodoor Manus purchases Coster Diamonds from one of Coster’s inheritors. It becomes a company and remains so until the German occupation in 1940.
- 1945: After World War II, Wim Biallosterski, owner of a diamond sawing company, purchases the company Royal Coster Diamonds.
- 1962: Ben Meier purchases the Coster premises together with partner Max Meents, Joop Schoos and Simon Cohen.
- 1970: The old diamond factory has to make way for the construction of the town hall (Stopera). Coster Diamonds moves to its current location at the Paulus Potterstraat at the famous Museum Square.
- 1995: The well-known diamond factory Van Moppes Diamonds was purchased by Coster Diamonds.
- 2005: Coster Diamonds was obliged to close the Van Moppes Diamonds factory. Due to events in the world like terrorism and SARS in the Far East, there were hardly any visitors left.
- 2007: Opening of the Diamond Museum Amsterdam to display some of the most beautiful diamond artifacts.
- 2007: Introduction of a new patented round diamond cut with 201 facets. This brilliant cut with 144 extra facets, is called "The Royal 201". It's considered to be the most sparkling diamond cut in the world.
- 2016: King Willem-Alexander of the Netherlands grants Coster Diamonds the Honorary title Royal (Dutch: Koninklijk). Hereby, Coster Diamonds became Royal Coster Diamonds. To become Royal, an organization has to be leading in its field of expertise, be of national importance and has to be in existence for at least 100 years.

== Famous diamond polishers ==
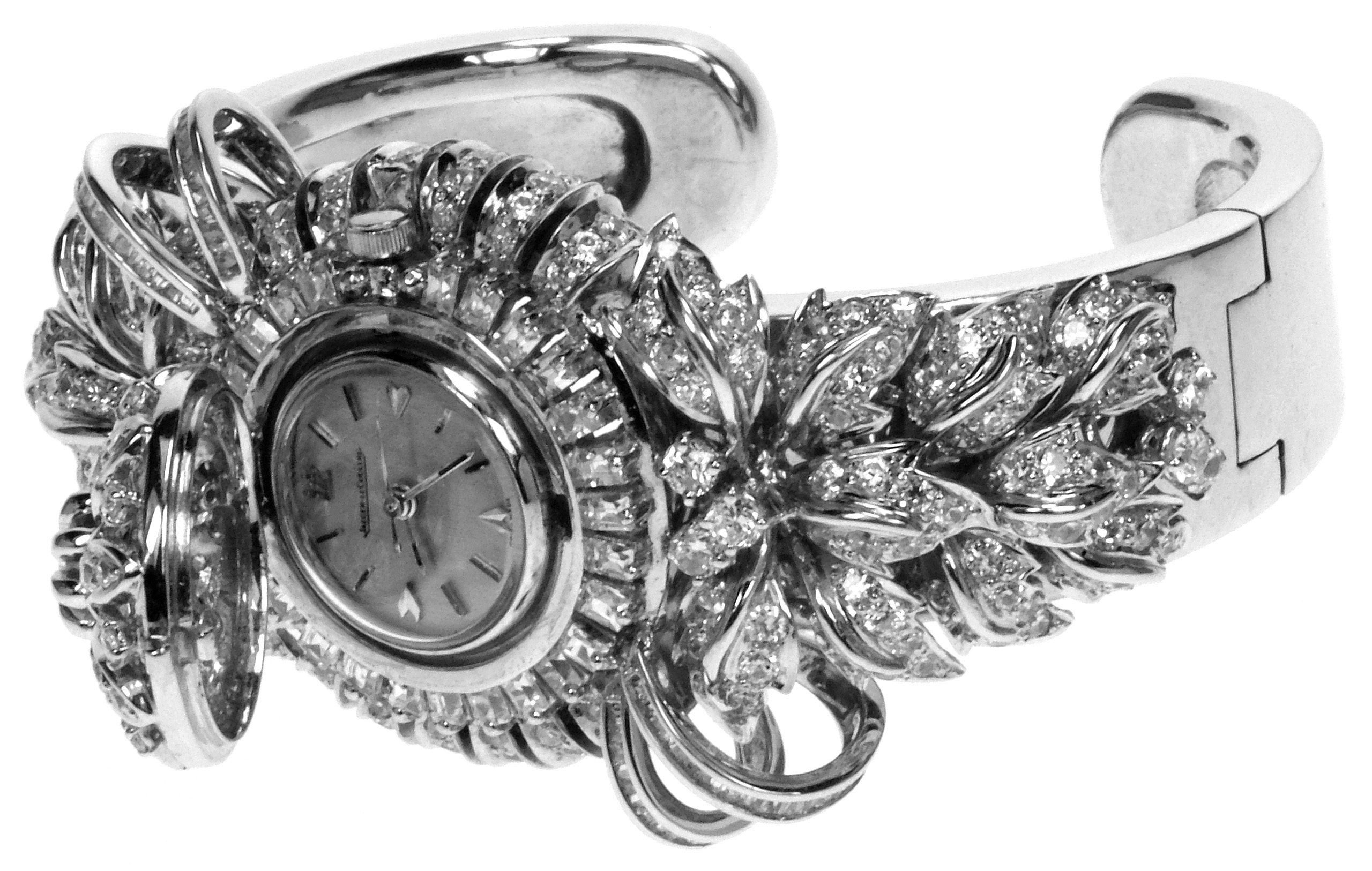
The watch of Queen Juliana

In 1852, Mr J.A. Feder and Mr L.B. Voorzanger, both diamond polishers at Royal Coster Diamonds, went to London to re-cut the famous Koh-i Noor. Mr J.A. Fedder died in 1864. Louis Benjamin Voorzanger won the silver medal for his achievements at the World Exhibition in Paris in 1855. He also polished the “famous diamond Star of the South”. He died in 1886. The family of the deceased diamond polisher still owns the silver plates with the inscription of this price for the diamond polishers, who polished the Koh-i Noor.

In 1959, Ben Meier polished the many diamonds which were set in a white gold watch, which was presented to Queen Juliana by the Dutch people. Between 1991 and 1994 Pauline Willemse, a diamond polisher at Royal Coster Diamonds, polished the smallest diamond in the world. This is a brilliant cut stone with 57 facets, weighing 0.0000743 carats (0.01486 mg). 0.16–0.17 mm in diameter and with a height of 0.11 mm. This event was published in the Guinness Book of Records. This and other famous diamonds are on display at Royal Coster Diamonds and can be seen during a diamond tour through the polishing factory.

== Royal 201 ==
In 2007, Donny Griffioen and Bobby Low developed the Royal 201 diamond cut at Royal Coster Diamonds. Featuring 201 facets - compared to the 57 facets of a traditional round brilliant cut - the design incorporates additional facets along the gridle to alter light reflection. The complex design requires specialized cutting techniques, which are performed by selected cutters at the company. To accompany, Royal Coster Diamonds created the "Signature C," a setting designed to elevate the diamond above its mounting.
