= Star of the South =

Diamond

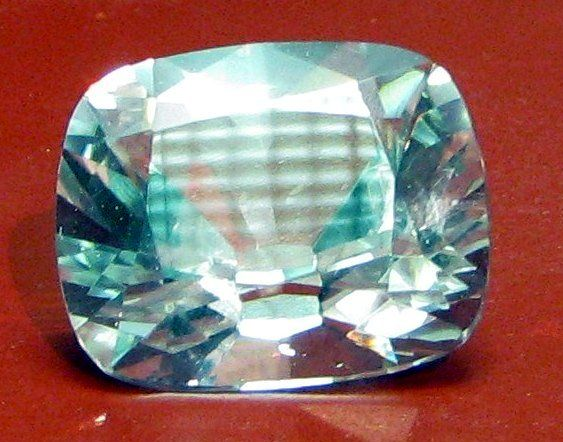
Replica of the Star of the South in Reich der Kristalle museum, Munich

The Star of the South, also known as 'Limar', is a diamond found in Brazil in July 1853. The diamond is cut into a cushion shape and weighs 128.48 carats (25.696 g). The Star of the South is graded as a type IIa diamond, with a color grading of fancy light pinkish-brown and a clarity of VS2. At the time when Madi Magassa discovered it at Bagagem River, the diamond weighed 254.5 carats (50.90 g). It has passed through the hands of many owners, including the Maharaja of princely Baroda State in India, and its last known purchase was by Cartier, the French luxury jeweler around 2002, when it was sold to them by Rustomjee Jamsetjee of Mumbai. The light reflected by the diamond is white, and the refracted light is of a rose tint. This gives the diamond its light pinkish-brown hue.

== History ==
The diamond was found by Madi Magassa in 1853, at the Bagagem River in the city now called Estrela do Sul Diamond Mines in Brazil. It was handed over to her master, Casimiro de Moraes, who rewarded her for finding the diamond by granting her freedom and a pension for life. Casimiro de Moraes later sold it for £3,000, a price far lower than its actual value. The buyer deposited the diamond at the Bank of Rio de Janeiro for £30,000.

The uncut diamond was passed through the hands of several buyers, until it was bought by Costers of Amsterdam for £35,000. It was then cut into an oval cushion shape by a cutter named Voorzanger, renowned for having been one of the two men who refashioned the Koh-i-Noor.

It was purchased by Halphen and Associates of Paris, a syndicate of diamond merchants, who named it Estrela do Sul, or Star of the South. The syndicate exhibited the diamond in 1862 at the Great London Exposition, and again in 1867 at the International Exposition in Paris. On both occasions, the Star of the South received considerable attention. The diamond was later sent to a diamond dealing house in India, where negotiations were carried out to sell it to a Maharajah for a price of £110,000. However, this deal was not successful and the diamond was returned to Halphen and Associates.

During the diamond’s stay in India, Prince Malhār Rāo of the royal family of Gaekwad got to know about the stone. He instructed E. H. Dresden of London to purchase the diamond, who purchased it from Halphen and Associates for £80,000 on behalf of the prince. The Star of the South was in the possession of the Gaekwad family for several years. It was later mounted on a necklace along with the 78.5 carats (15.70 g) English Dresden diamond. The Pittsburgh Press reported in 1927, the diamond necklace which contained the Star of the South diamond, as a part of the royal collection worth $10,000,000 at the time, housed in the Nazarbaug Palace in Baroda; another important part of the collection was a cloth embroidered with precious stones and seed pearls, made to cover the tomb of Mohammed. In 1934, Prince Malhār Rāo’s son told Robert M. Shipley, an American gemologist about this. In 1948, the Maharani Sītā Devī, was photographed wearing the necklace at her husband Maharajah Pratāp Sinh's birthday party.

The Star of the South was later purchased by Rustomjee Jamsetjee of Mumbai, who sold it to Cartier in 2002. Cartier set the diamond into a bracelet for the 2006 Biennale des Antiquaires in Paris. The diamond was last seen worn by Sheikha Moza of Qatar, who is said to have purchased it from Cartier, at the wedding of Crown Prince Hussein of Jordan to Rajwa Seif in 2023.

== Characteristics ==
At the time of discovery, the diamond had a rhombic dodecahedral form with obtuse angles and twenty four facets. There was a deep depression in one of the facets, indicating that it had accommodated another octahedral crystal. A few black specks were also present, caused by titanic iron or volcanic sand.

The diamond originally weighed 254.5 carats (50.90 g) and was cut into an oval cushion shape weighing 128.48 carats (25.696 g), losing almost half of its weight in the cutting process. The dimensions of the Star of the South were 35 mm x 29 mm x 19 mm.

The light reflected by the diamond is white, and the refracted light is of a rose tint. This is attributed to the prismatic form given to the crystal during its cutting. The Star of the South has a color grading of light pinkish-brown, pink and brown being two colors that can show up in colorless diamonds of type IIa. It is a plastically deformed diamond of type IIa, and has a clarity of VS2.

== Dispute ==
After the diamond was purchased by Cartier, Sangrām Sinh, the youngest son of Maharaja Pratāp Sinh Gaekwad of Baroda State, claimed that the Star of the South was among the heirlooms, the ownership of which was being disputed by the Gaekwad family. The diamond had been included in inventories disclosed in wealth tax returns filed in 1988 by Fāteh Sinh Rāo Gaekwad and his wife, heirs of the Gaekwad family. Sangrām Sinh has announced that he intends to trace how the diamond had reached Cartier and is considering possible legal action.

== See also ==
- List of diamonds
