= Sita Devi, Maharani of Baroda =

Pithapurami Royal and Indian socialite (1917–1989)

Her Royal Highness Maharani Sita Devi of Baroda, Princess of Pithapuram
- Maharani of Baroda
- Tenure: 1935–1956
- Titles: Maharajkumari of Pithapuram
- Styles: Her Royal Highness Maharani Sita Devi Sahib Gaekwad.
- Other titles: Rani of Vuyyuru
- Other names: The Indian Wallis Simpson
- Born: 12 May 1917; Madras, British India
- Died: 15 February 1989 (aged 71); Paris, France
- Cause of death: Heartbreak and Illness
- Residence: Paris and Monaco

Maharani Sita Devi of Baroda, Princess of Pithapuram popularly referred to as Maharanee of Baroda also known as the 'Indian Wallis Simpson' (12 May 1917 – 15 February 1989).Was a Telugu Princess, socialite, royal, the Maharani of Baroda through marriage, and a member of the international jet set.

== Early life ==
Sita Devi was born in Madras, British India on 12 May 1917 as Maharajkumari (titular princess) Sita Devi of Pithapuram to the Maharaja of Pithapuram, Sri Raja Rao Venkata Kumara Mahipati Surya Rau Bahadur Garu and his wife, Sri Rani Chinnamamba Devi of Mirzapuram, (Nuzvid Zamindari), while Sita Devi's father was named a 'Maharajah' (meaning king or Prince) he was a Zamindar, and from an aristocratic noble Telugu family not a Princely state, so her title of Princess by birth was largely Titular or ceremonial.

Sita Devi first married Meka Rangaiah Appa Rao Bahadur, Zamindar of Vuyyuru.^{[2]} They had three children including a son, Rajah M. Viduth Kumar Apparao. she was a close friend of Princess Niloufer, daughter-in-law of the 7th Nizam of Hyderabad, and of Rajkumari Yashoda Pari.

== Marriage and life as a socialite ==
Young Sita Devi, as Princess of Pithapuram circa 1930s–1940s

=== Remarriage and controversy ===
Sita Devi met her second husband, Pratap Singh Gaekwad of Baroda, at the Madras horse races in 1943. The Gaekwad was, at that time, considered the eighth richest man in the world. It was also reported that he was the second richest Indian prince. The Gaekwad subsequently began to court Sita Devi, while both of them were married. Sita Devi then consulted her lawyers on ways to divorce her first husband, and as there was no provision for women to divorce according to British law and doing so would be seen as scandalous, the lawyers recommended a legal loophole that Sita Devi who was practicing the Telugu folk religion which was considered "Hindu" under British Law convert herself to Islam to dissolve her marriage to the Zamindar. Following suit Sita Devi, renamed herself Begum Sheherazade, asked her husband the Zamindar to convert with her, knowing he would refuse and call on a divorce with her. Consequently which was what the Zamindar did, she then quickly converted herself back to a classified Hindoo through the Arya Samaj, in order to marry the Gaekwad of Baroda.

Sita Devi wearing the Star of the South diamond necklace for a party in the Lakshmi Vilas Palace, Vadodara

After her conversion, The Gaekwad took her as his second wife in 1943, which caused uproar and scandal with the British authorities, as this violated the antibigamy laws that the previous Gaekwad of Baroda enacted. The British Viceroy in New Delhi summoned the Gaekwad to contest this marriage. The latter argued that the law applied to the subjects of Baroda, and that he being their monarch was exempt from this law. This was confirmed by the Viceroy's legal advisers. The British government accepted the marriage, but did not refer to the Maharani as "Her Highness" as was the protocol for the consorts of rulers of princely states, as a means to humiliate Sita Devi.

=== Extravagance and lavish spending ===
"Princie" Maharaj Kumar Sayajirao Gaekwad, son of Maharani Sita Devi in portrait with lapdog, 1950

In 1946, the Gaekwad took his second wife on a tour of Europe. The reason for their visit was to find a suitable residence away from India.They found that the independent Principality of Monaco was a suitable place to set up their second home. They bought a mansion in Monte Carlo and the Maharani took up permanent residence there. Sita Devi had only one son with Pratap Singh Rao Gaekwad named Sayaji Rao Gaekwad, nicknamed "Princie", born in 1945. He was considered the apple of her eye, and was her favorite child.

The couple also made two trips to the United States after WWII. They went on a spending spree, spending extravagantly. It was widely reported they spent about $10 million in one of them.

Portrait of Maharanee Sita Devi of Baroda, standing amidst tropical landscape, 1950

Finding that the British Empire was soon to end, the princely couple transferred a copious amount from the Baroda treasury to their personal possession from 1943 to 1948, including some of its most famous jewelry, including four celebrated pearl carpets,^{[4]} a famed seven-strand necklace of priceless pearls (called the Baroda pearls), a three-strand diamond necklace with the famous Pink Brazilian Star of the South 128.80-carat (25.760 g) diamond and the English Dresden 78.53-carat (15.706 g) diamond. The princely couple also had custody of the Empress Eugenie diamond.

Eventually, upon the end of the British Empire in 1947, the newly formed state of India, integrated Baroda state in 1949. And soon began auditing the principality's finances. They concluded the Gaekwad had taken several large interest-free loans from the Baroda treasury for his lavish trips with Sita Devi and buying luxury goods. The state demanded that these be returned. The prince complied by making several payments from his $8 million-a-year income.^{[2]}However, due to the discrepancies and possible fraud, the Indian state deposed the Gaekwad in 1951 and his eldest son by his first wife succeeded him. Technically, the Sita Devi and the Gaekwad were no longer heads of state after 1949, but they retained their rights, titles and privileges in a titular and ceremonial capacity. But post the 1951 deposition the Maharaja was legally stripped of his titles, which were given to his son from his first wife. Sita Devi however kept her title as 'Maharani' and flatly refused to accept any compromise.^{[5]} The Indian state finding several of the Baroda crown jewels had become the Maharani's personal possessions, persecuted Sita Devi and tried to inform foreign governments she had become a person of interest. But the Maharanee now travelled using a British Passport with an American diplomatic visa, bypassing declaration of any possessions she took with her, as she was under diplomatic immunity.

Maharani Sita Devi, with her son Sayajirao Gaekwad (nicknamed Princie) in Monaco 1960s

=== Establishment into the international Jet set ===
She attended exclusive events, galas and high-society gatherings with members of the international Jet set, such as Aristotle Onassis, Maria Callas, Jacqueline de Ribes and Princess Grace of Monaco. The Maharanee by then had earned a reputation of being the most glamorous person in any society gathering. The Marriage with the Gaekwad however, did not last too long, the Maharanee divorced the Gaekwad in 1956, Sita Devi had amassed a considerable fortune through the marriage including famous pieces of jewellery from the Baroda crown jewels, and lived in luxury between Paris and Monte Carlo, the Gaekwad after the divorce moved to London.

Maria Callas, Aristotle Onassis and Sita Devi leaving the Opéra de Monte-Carlo, Monaco, 1962

=== The famous Wildenstein case ===
In 1965, she purchased a painting in Paris from Daniel Wildenstein, believing it to be La Poésie by François Boucher. When it was discovered to be a fake, she sued Wildenstein in an English court despite both her and him residing in France. The case, Maharanee of Baroda v Wildenstein, established an important rule regarding the presence of a defendant in conflict of laws. The Maharanee sued Wildenstien only when he entered the UK for the Ascot race season, rather than at Paris. The English High Court also legally classified her as 'Her Royal Highness' during the suit, which turned to be a landmark case in English law. Even after the end of her marriage with the Gaekwad, Sita's Rolls-Royce still sported the crest of Baroda. She would reminisce about the days when she was a Queen and received 101-gun salutes. Prince Rainier awarded citizenship of Monaco to Sita Devi and her son. The Maharanee maintained a Paris apartment as well, in the 16th arrondissement, she continued to live in grand style, drinking Baron de Rothschild's Bordeaux, rearranging her Louis XVI furniture and attending exclusive parties. When travelling she brought along a large wardrobe, reported to be a thousand saris, hundreds of pairs of shoes and her jewellery.

The Emerald & Diamond Van Cleef & Arpels necklace of Sita Devi, one of her many pieces in her famous jewelry collection

=== Days as the 'Indian Wallis Simpson' ===
In 1953, she sold a pair of bejewelled anklets to Harry Winston. They had several large emeralds and diamonds. The jeweller set these stones into a spectacular necklace that was bought by the Wallis Simpson, the Duchess of Windsor. The Duchess wore this to a ball in New York, also attended by Sita Devi. When other guests were admiring the necklace. The Maharani who recognised that she formerly used to wear them as anklets, was heard to exclaim that those jewels looked better on her feet. The embarrassed Duchess returned the necklace to Winston.

The Maharani was a car enthusiast and was reportedly very fond of her Mercedes W126, which was custom made for her by Mercedes-Benz. At the 1969 Ascot Gold Cup she invited guests to touch the 30-carat (6.0 g) sapphire on her right hand for good luck. Esquire Magazine included Sita Devi and Princie on its list of "fun couples" for 1969.

=== Later life & death ===
The Maharanee following the turn of the 60's became increasingly reliant on her son as a source of her emotional & moral support. The Prince, Sayaji rao who was gay felt the policed climate of Europe in the 60's became more reclusive as he grew older and participated in the hedonistic parties that took place in Europe as a result of the heavy societal repression of the Gay community during that period. Princie later was known for switching several different Boyfriends, utilising drugs and substances and overdosing on alcohol. The Maharanee worried greatly about Princie, this was also as eventually the fortune of the Maharanee was growing lesser. In fact, the Maharanee altogether stopped making any social appearances after 1973, her finances were eventually reduced enough for her to secretly auction some of her beloved jewels in 1974.

The Maharanee tried setting up meetings with her dwindling circle of connections such as Aristotle Onassis, at Maxim's in Paris, in hopes someone would set Princie up with a job in Wall street & teach him the ways of making money, although many such conversations took place, no one was able to convince, or be convinced that Princie had any such inclination, or ability to succeed in such an industry. While such efforts were taken by his mother, Princie still carried on in a unregulated way.

Tragedy struck Maharani Sita Devi of Baroda in 1985, when Prince died by committing suicide at age 40. His death was attributed to alcoholism and drug addiction. This broke the Maharanee's heart, leading to her eventual passing, Sita Devi died four years later of natural causes bedridden and ill.

=== Estate of the Maharanee ===
Sita Devi's pearl carpet of Baroda

Years after the Maharani's death some of the precious items were discovered. In 1994 the pearl carpet was found in a Geneva vault. It was sold to an Arab prince for $31 million.Currently this carpet is displayed at the Museum of Islamic Art, Doha, in Qatar. The Star of the South and other gems were located with jewellers in Amsterdam.

After the Maharani's death, a part of her inheritance was transferred to her niece daughter of Rani Manjula Devi (sister of Sita Devi who married into the Sidhli family) Anangarekha Devi who currently lives in Assam.

=== Spirituality & charity ===
while the Maharanee was known for her excessive lifestyle & glamour, she also was allegedly a inwardly spiritual person. She is noted to have followed the Advaita philosophy & to have immersed herself in the Nayanmars & Shaiva Siddhanta, and was a follower of Ramana Maharishi.

== Titles ==
- 1917–1935 : Maharajkumari Sita Devi of Pithapuram
- 1935–1943 : Maharajkumari Sita Devi, Zamindarini of Vuyyur
- 1943–1955 : Her Highness, Maharani Sita Devi, Maharani of Baroda
