= Museumplein =

Square in Amsterdam, Netherlands

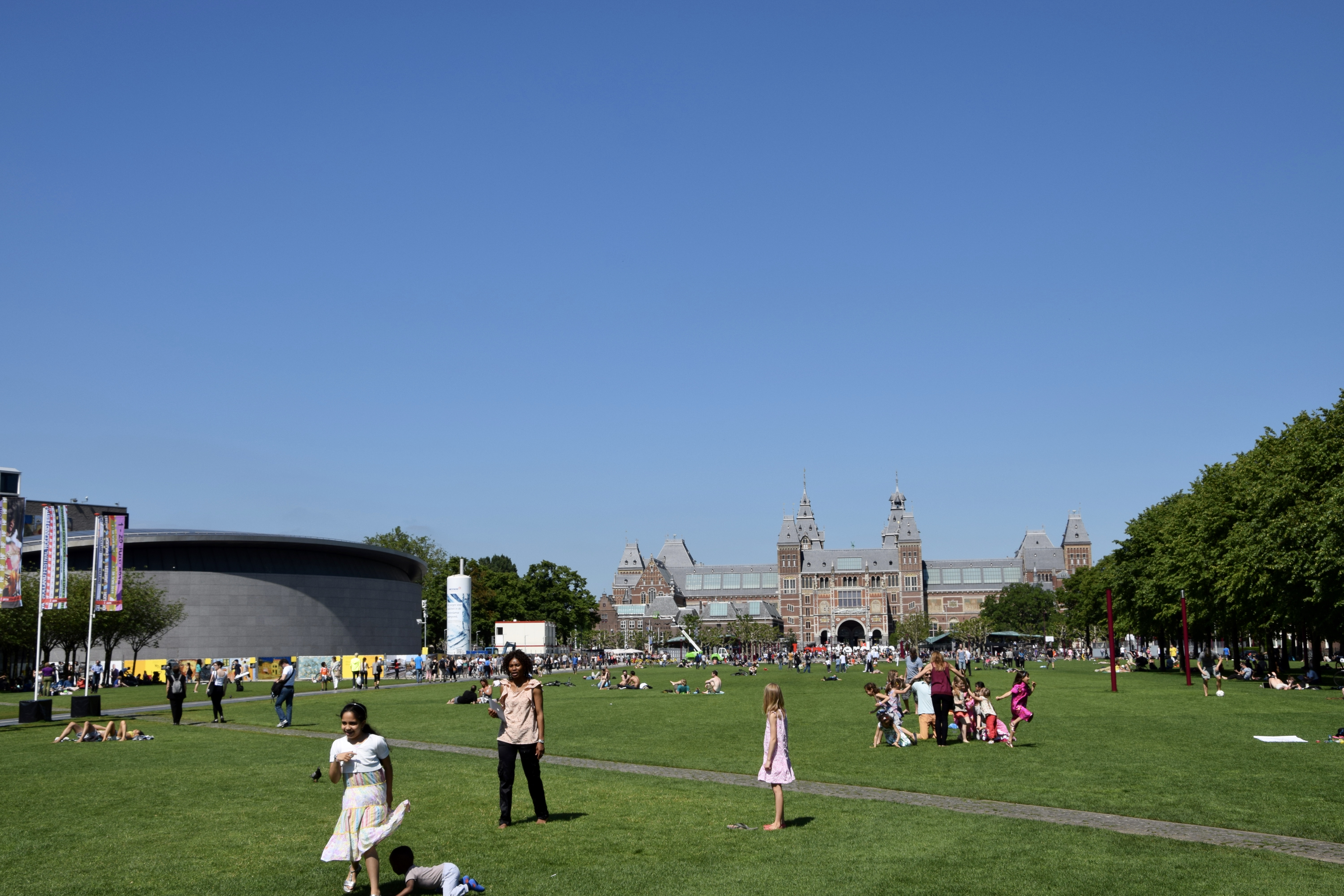
- Museum Square in 2014, with the Van Gogh Museum and the Rijksmuseum

- Location within Amsterdam
- Location: Amsterdam
- Coordinates: 52.357262°N 4.881602°E
- North: Paulus Potterstraat
- East: Stadhouderskade
- South: Gabriel Metsustraat
- West: Van Baerlestraat

Construction
- Construction start: c. 1885

Other
- Designer: Pierre Cuypers
- Known for: the Rijksmuseum, Van Gogh Museum, Stedelijk Museum and the concert hall Concertgebouw

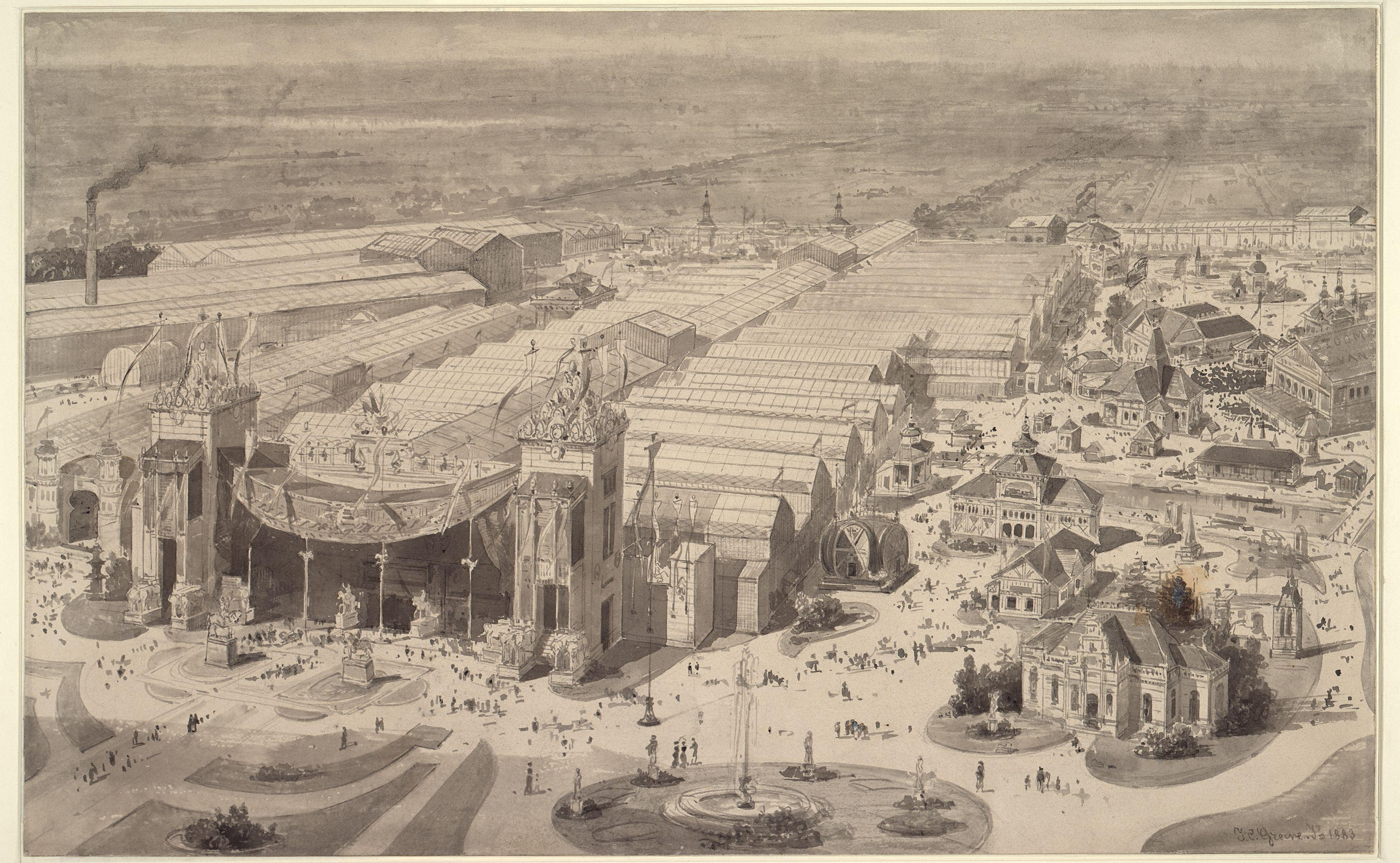
International Colonial and Export Exhibition in 1883

After the Oranje were crowned European champions in 1988, coach Rinus Michels and his players celebrated aboard a boat as they sailed through the Amsterdam canals, cheered on by around one million people, before the celebrations concluded with a ceremony at Museumplein, as seen here.
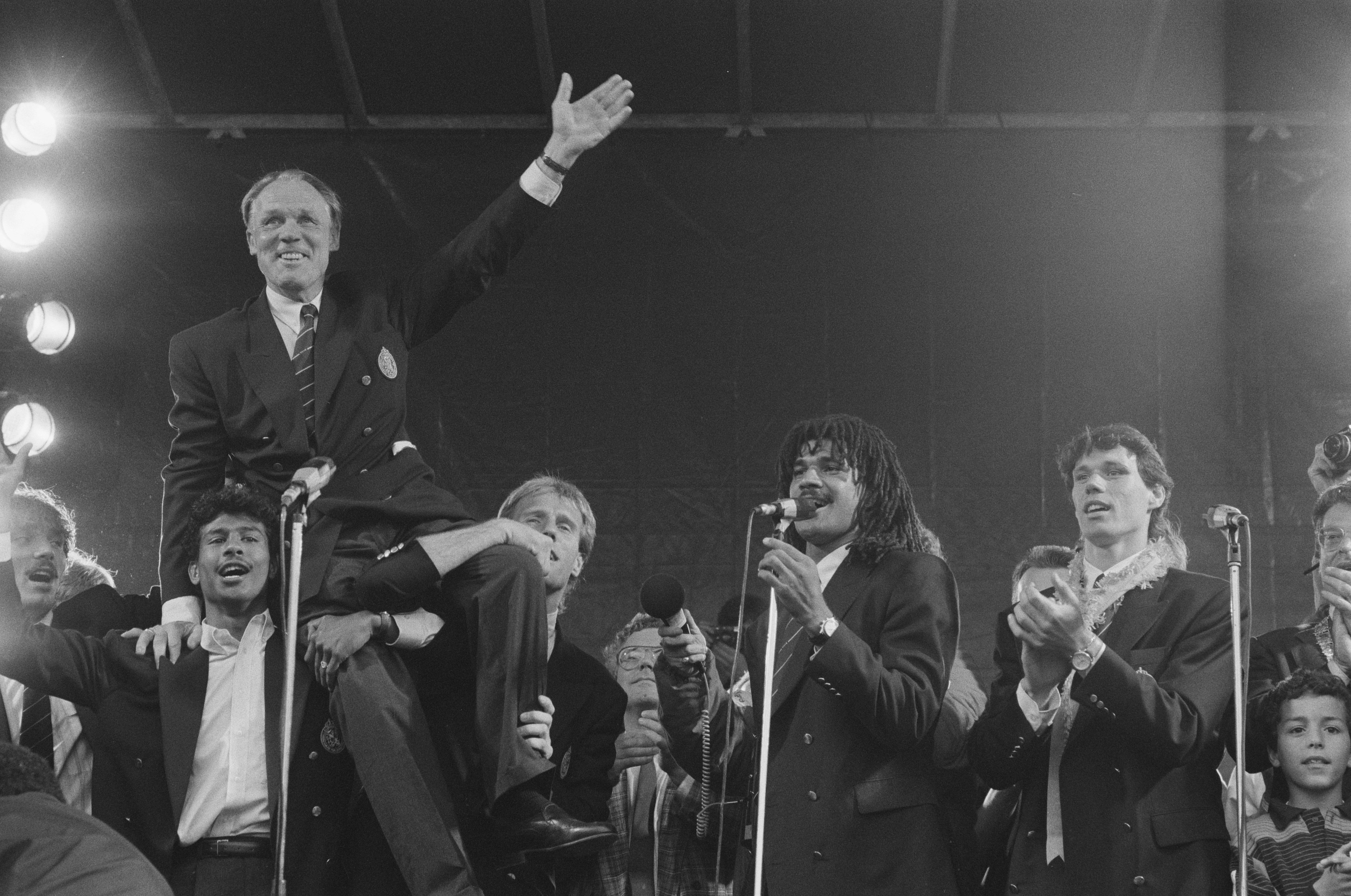
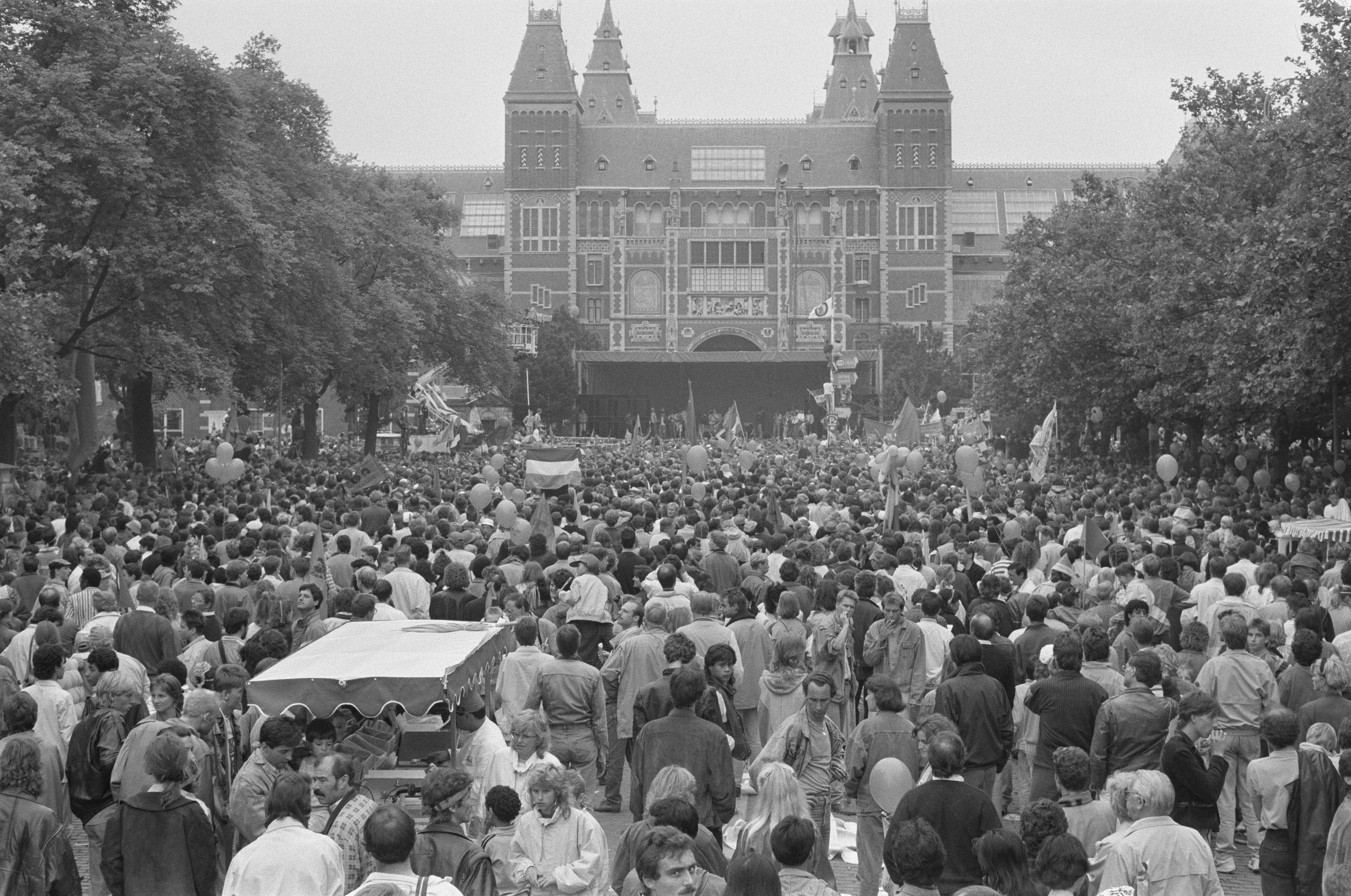

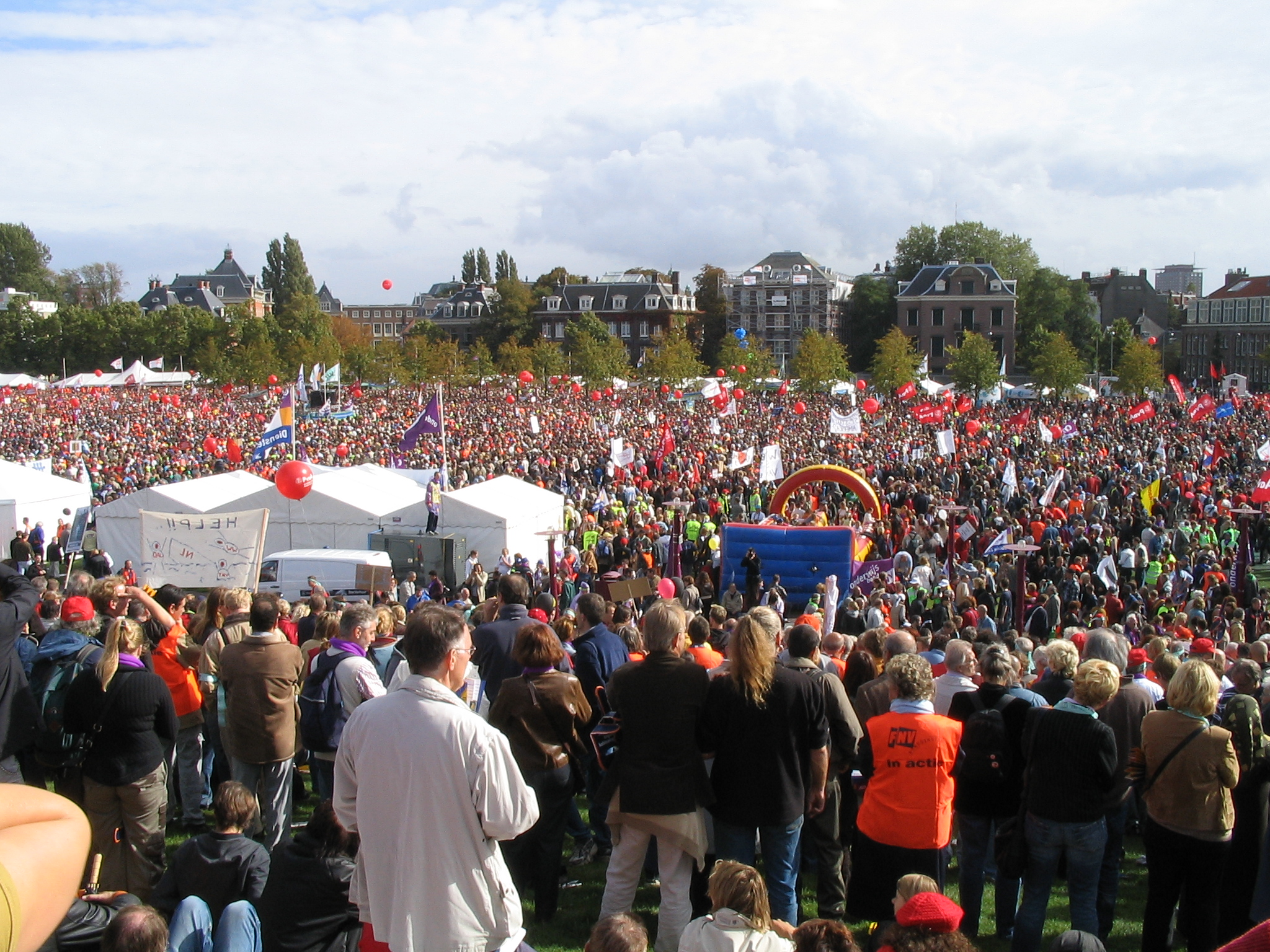
Demonstration against government policies in 2004

The Museumplein (Dutch pronunciation: [myˌzeːjʏmˈplɛin]; English: Museum Square) is a public space in the Museumkwartier neighbourhood of the Amsterdam-Zuid borough in Amsterdam, Netherlands. Located at the Museumplein are three major museums – the Rijksmuseum, Van Gogh Museum, and Stedelijk Museum – and the concert hall Concertgebouw.

The area was originally a wax candle factory and marshy meadows. Construction began following the completion of the Rijksmuseum in 1885, with a street plan based on the design of Pierre Cuypers, the museum's celebrated architect. The area was the location of the International Colonial and Export Exhibition in 1883.

The Museumplein was reconstructed after a design by the Swedish/Danish landscape architect Sven-Ingvar Andersson in 1999. It now includes underground parking spaces and an underground supermarket. In the winter, the pond can be transformed into an artificial ice skating area. The space is also used for (mass) events such as festivals, celebrations, and demonstrations.

In July 2017 the 2017 FIBA 3x3 Europe Cup, the European 3x3 basketball tournament, was held at the Museumplein.

The main "I AMsterdam" sign was also located here in front of the Rijksmuseum, until 4 December 2018, when it was removed at the behest of the city council.

The sculpture "Self Portrait of a Dreamer" by Joseph Klibansky was exhibited within the pond from 26 June 2018 to 28 Aug 2018.

== Surrounding buildings ==
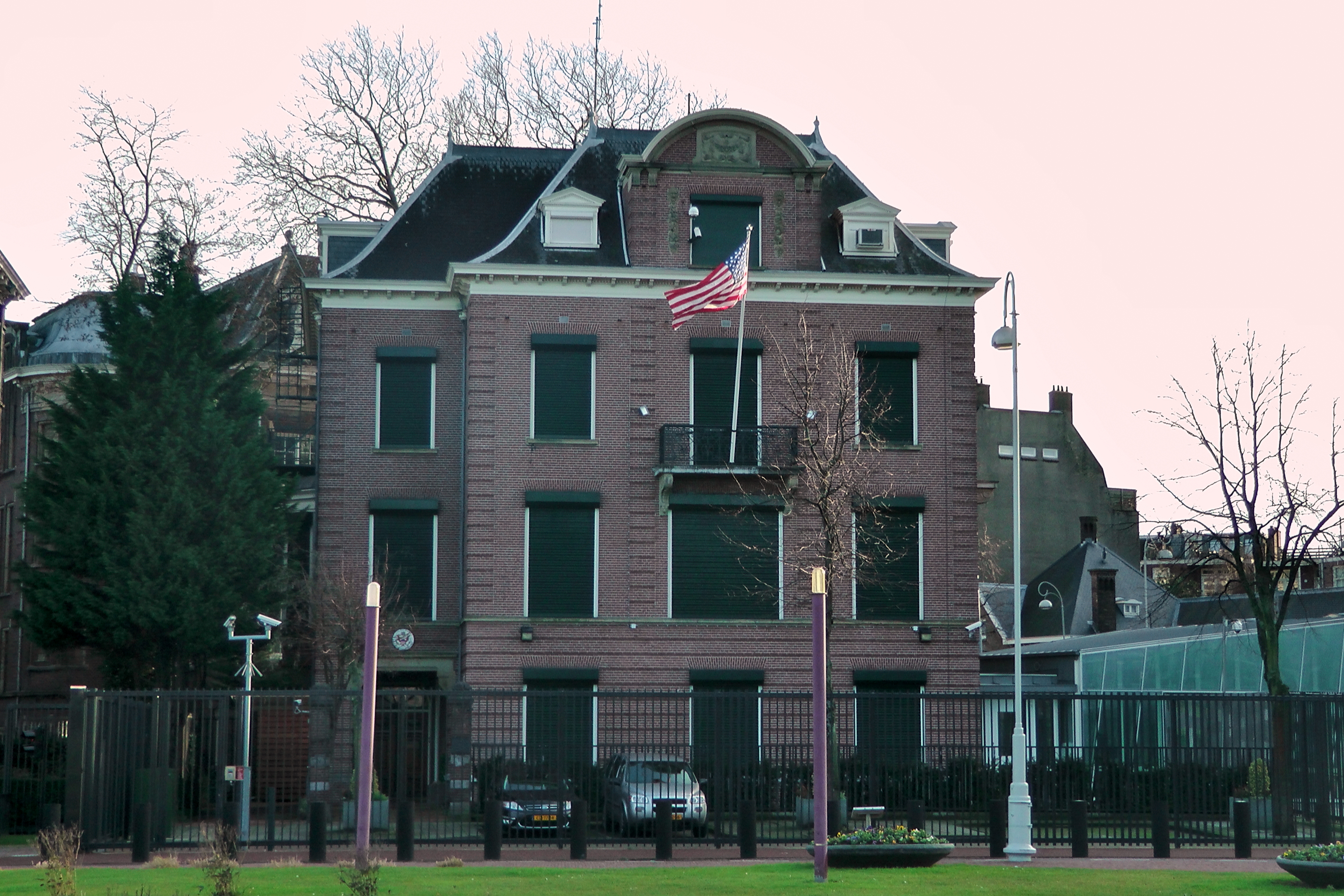
US Consulate General in Amsterdam Museumplein

- Consulate General of Turkey
- Consulate General of the United States
- Concertgebouw
- Stedelijk Museum
- Van Gogh Museum
- House of Bols
- Diamond Museum
- Coster Diamonds
- Rijksmuseum
- Moco Museum (opened at the end of May 2016)
