= Diamond Museum Amsterdam =

Museum in Amsterdam about diamonds

- Diamant Museum Amsterdam
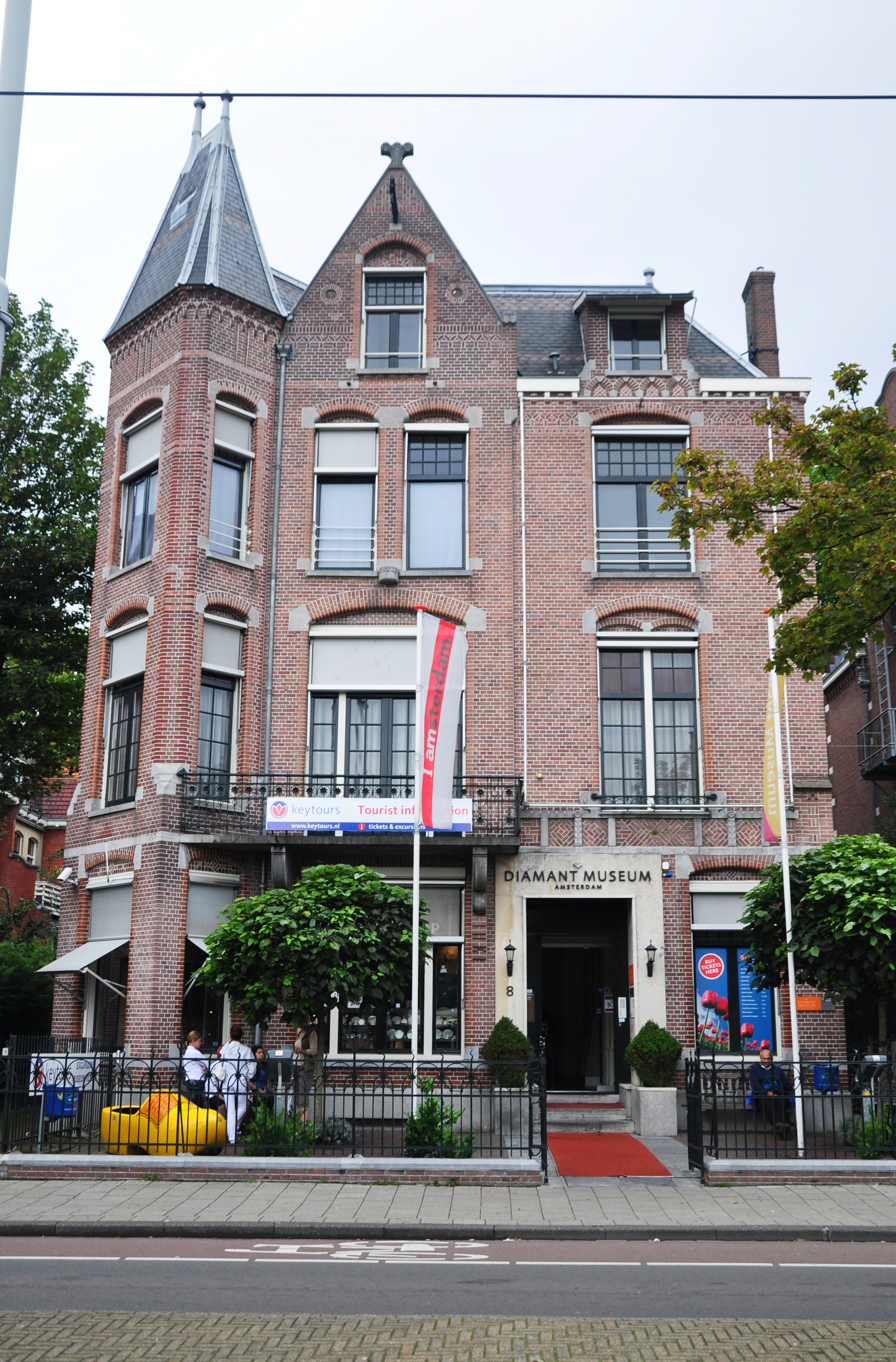
- Museum in 2011

- Location of the museum in the city of Amsterdam
- Established: 2007
- Location: Paulus Potterstraat 8 Amsterdam, Netherlands
- Coordinates: 52°21′34″N 4°52′57″E
- Accreditation: International Council of Museums
- Founder: Ben Meier
- Director: Robert Tamara
- President: Kees Noomen
- Owner: Coster Diamonds
- Website: www.diamantmuseumamsterdam.nl

The Diamond Museum Amsterdam (Dutch: Diamant Museum Amsterdam) is a museum located at the Museumplein in Amsterdam, Netherlands. The museum was founded in 2007 by Ben Meier of Coster Diamonds. The permanent collection consists of diamond jewelry and gives background information about diamonds.

The museum is a member of the Dutch Museum Association and the Official Museums of Amsterdam.
