= Narayan Satham =

Indian cricketer, coach, and administrator (1949–2023)

Personal information
- Full name: Narayan Yashwantrao Satham
- Born: 12 July 1949; Dabhoi, Province of Bombay, India
- Died: 12 February 2023 (aged 73)
- Batting: Right-handed
- Bowling: Right-arm fast-medium

Domestic team information
- Years: Team
- 1967/68–1984/85: Baroda

Career statistics
Competition	FC	List A
Matches	84	8
Runs scored	3,119	11
Batting average	28.61	3.66
100s/50s	4/12	0/0
Top score	197	8
Balls bowled	11,181	378
Wickets	193	5
Bowling average	31.31	50.20
5 wickets in innings	7	0
10 wickets in match	1	n/a
Best bowling	8/65	3/33
Catches/stumpings	32/–	0/–
- Source: ESPNcricinfo, 24 August 2019

Narayan Yashwantrao Satham (12 July 1949 – 12 February 2023) was an Indian first-class cricketer who played for Baroda. He worked as an administrator and coach after his playing career.

== Career ==
Satham was right-arm fast-medium bowler who made his first-class debut for Baroda at the age of 18 during the 1967–68 Ranji Trophy. He became part of Baroda's pace trio which included Cecil Williams and Anthony Fernandes. In a career that lasted until the 1984/85 season, Satham appeared in 84 first-class matches in which he took 193 wickets at an average of 31.31. He was also a handy lower-order batsman with more than 3000 runs including four centuries. Satham represented West Zone in Duleep Trophy and against touring Sri Lankan and English teams.

Satham worked in cricket administrative and coaching roles after retirement. After officiating as a match referee in domestic tournaments, he worked as the head coach of the Singapore national under-19 and senior teams for three years until 1999. In 2001, Satham, along with Mohinder and Surinder Amarnath, trained cricketers in Tangier, Morocco, as part of a cricket development pact with the Moroccan Cricket Association. In 2008, Satham, Williams, Anshuman Gaekwad and Nayan Mongia formed the Veteran Cricketers Association. He then had two tenures as the chairman of cricket improvement committee (CIC) of the Baroda Cricket Association (BCA) and was a member of BCA managing committee until his resignation in 2018. He also coached at the Sangramsinh Gaekwad Cricket Academy in Vadodara.

Satham died on 12 February 2023, at the age of 73.
