= Maharanee of Baroda v Wildenstein =

1972 English Court of Appeal decision

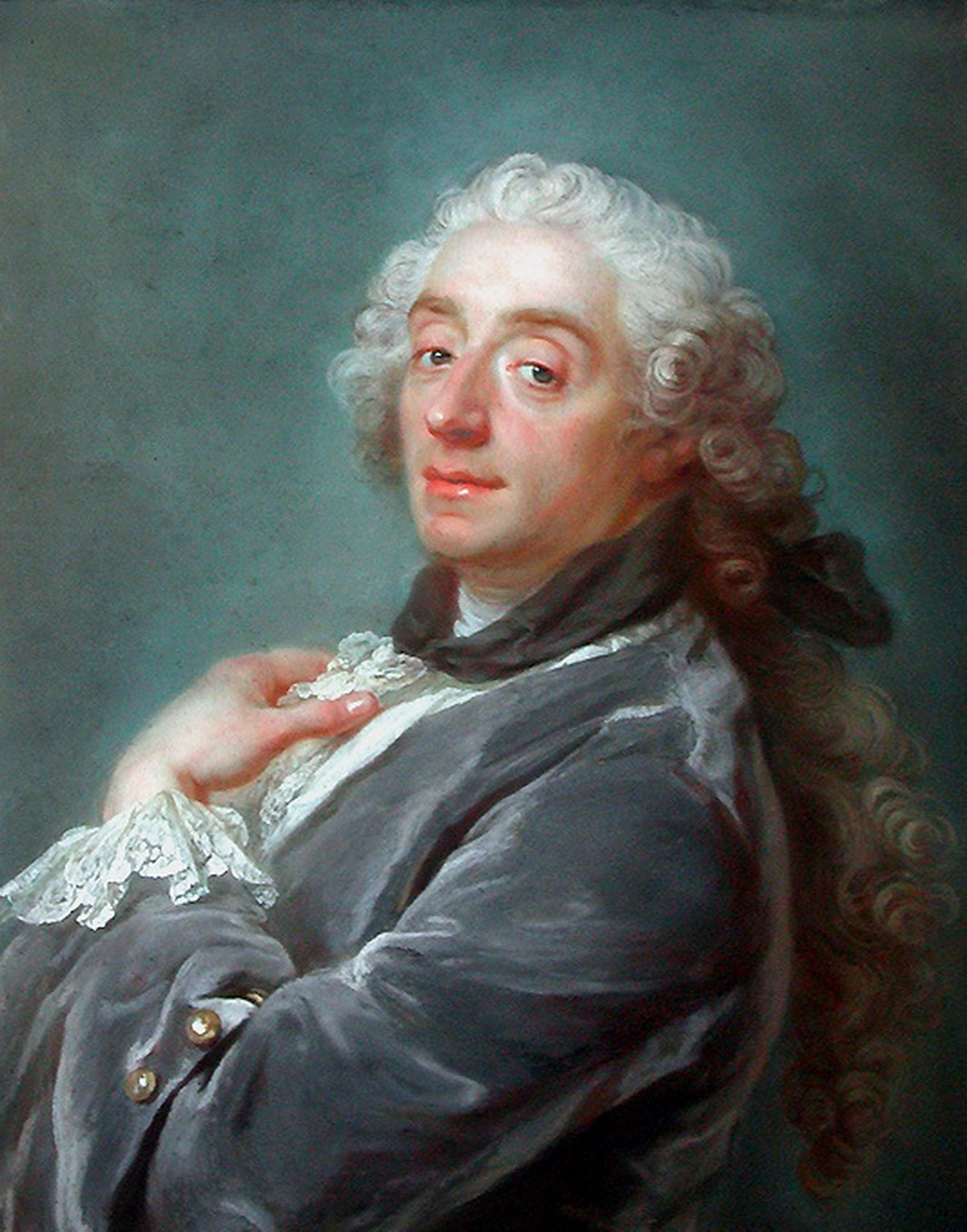
- The French master, François Boucher
- Court: Court of Appeal
- Full case name: H.R.H. Maharanee Sethadevi Gaekwar of Baroda v Daniel Wildenstein
- Decided: 9 March 1972
- Citations: [1972] 2 QB 283 [1972] 2 WLR 1077 [1972] 2 All ER 689

Court membership
- Judges sitting: Lord Denning MR; Edmund Davies LJ; Stephenson LJ

Keywords
- forum non conveniens

HRH the Maharanee of Baroda v Wildenstein, was a decision of the English Court of Appeal relating to the conflict of laws, and specifically whether the English courts should take jurisdiction in relation to a claim which had no substantial connections with England on the basis that the defendant was served with proceedings during a brief visit to the country.

The case was decided before the modern development of the doctrine of forum non conveniens and the decision of the House of Lords in Spiliada Maritime Corp v Cansulex Ltd, and is no longer considered to be good law in that regard. The case is often still referred to by way of illustration to the parochial and slightly paternalistic view previously taken by the English courts in relation to matters of jurisdiction, and in particular the comments of Lord Denning MR and Edmund Davies LJ.

However the principle established by the case that presence within the jurisdiction is not negated only because it is a short or transient presence remains good law.

== Facts ==
The Maharanee of Baroda and Mr Wildenstein both lived in France, although in the judgment they were both described as being "citizens of the world". Mr Wildenstein was an art dealer of international repute. In 1965 the Maharanee purchased a painting from Mr Wildenstein in Paris which was believed to be La Poésie by François Boucher for the equivalent of approximately £33,000.

In 1968 the painting was reviewed by Mr Francis Watson, who was the Surveyor of Her Majesty's works of Art. He expressed the view that it was not a Boucher. The Maharanee sent the painting to Christie's for a formal valuation. They expressed the view that the painting "cannot be regarded as an autograph work by François Boucher, but would appear to be a work from his immediate circle of followers. We think that it might make about £750 at auction...".

The Maharanee instructed her solicitors to issue a writ against Mr Wildenstein claiming that painting was not a Boucher and seeking rescission and repayment of the purchase price. The writ was issued on 3 September 1969. However it was not served on Mr Wildenstein until 20 June 1970 when he was in the United Kingdom visiting the Ascot races.

Mr Wildenstein objected to the court taking jurisdiction, and successfully applied for the writ to be set aside. The Maharanee appealed against that decision to the Court of Appeal.

== Judgment ==
The lead judgment was given by Lord Denning MR. He held that the writ had been properly served on the defendant in England, and if a defendant is properly served with a writ while he is in this country, albeit on a short visit, the plaintiff was entitled to continue the proceedings to the end. The plaintiff had validly invoked the jurisdiction of the Queen's courts; and was entitled to require those courts to proceed to adjudicate upon the claim. The courts should not strike the claim out unless it was vexatious or oppressive, or otherwise an abuse of the process of the court. If the statement of claim discloses a reasonable cause of action, the plaintiff is entitled to pursue it in the English courts, even though the cause of action did arise in a foreign country. It should not be stayed unless it would plainly be unjust to the defendant to require him to defend it in England, and that injustice must be so great as to outweigh the right of the plaintiff to continue the claim here. He held that the burden of proof was on Mr Wildenstein to show that it would be an injustice to him to have the case tried in England, and that he had not discharged that burden.

Edmund Davies and Stephenson LJJ gave concurring judgments.

== Comments ==
The case was notable for a number of comments made during the course of judgment about the superior nature of the English courts to the French ones, and rebuffing the notion that it would be inappropriate for the English courts to hear cases that were otherwise unconnected with England.

In relation to the suggestion that the case should properly be tried in France, Lord Denning MR stated:

Furthermore, there might be difficulties, if not injustice, in requiring the Maharanee to go to France to seek redress. We are told that the courts of France appoint their own court experts and might hesitate about receiving the opinion of experts from England. It would be a matter for their discretion. In any case, the French courts might not themselves see the witnesses or hear them cross-examined, but might only read their reports. ... Apart from the admission of evidence, there is the question of delay. We have been shown a speech which was made by the Premier President de la Cour de Cassation on October 2, 1970, in which he greatly regretted the delays in the civil procedure in France. He gave instances, such as a case started on December 22, 1953, which was finally decided on March 5, 1970; another started in 1950 decided in 1968; another of 1957 decided in 1969. It is said that this is due to the delaying tactics of lawyers. We are used to something of the kind here, but somehow we get over them in less time. So it does appear that the delay would be a good deal greater in France than in England. I have no doubt that this case could be brought for trial in England within a year.

Lord Denning would echo these comments a year later in The Atlantic Star, where he would say:

You may call this 'forum shopping' if you please, but if the forum is England, it is a good place to shop in, both for the quality of the goods and the speed of service.

Edmund Davies LJ also stated:

... in taking it out and serving it (albeit when the defendant was only fleetingly on British soil) she [the Maharanee] was doing no more than our law permits, even though it may have ruined his [Mr Wildenstein's] day at the races. Some might regard her action as bad form; none can legitimately condemn it as an abuse of legal process ...

== Significance ==
The case is no longer considered good law with respect to taking jurisdiction, and in modern times the decision would likely have been reversed, with a stay being granted on the basis of forum non conveniens. However the part of the decision that states that any transitory presence within the jurisdiction is still sufficient for the service of a writ remains good law.

The position of jurisdiction between the English and French courts is also now regulated by the Brussels Regime.
