= English Dresden =

The English Dresden is a famous diamond found at the Bagagem mines in Minas Gerais in Brazil, in 1857 at about the same time as the equally celebrated Star of the South. It was a part separated by cleavage from a larger mass, and in the rough weighed 119.5 carats. What exactly became of the remaining portion is unknown, though Mr. Dresden suggests that it may have either been destroyed when taking it from the rock, or may have remained behind in its former itacolumite matrix.

== History ==
The English Dresden was acquired in Rio de Janeiro by Edward Dresden, after whom it was named. He initially sent it to London for valuation. And later had it cut by Costers of Amsterdam, who had already earned a good reputation for the way they had cut the renowned diamond the Koh-i Nur for the British royal family. One of their experts, Mr. Voorsanger, cut it into a drop-form brilliant, weighing 76.5 carats. By chance, Dresden was able to compare it to the Koh-i Noor, he relates, "I matched my drop with the 'Koh-i-Noor' at Garrard's one day, and to the surprise of all present, the latter's color turned yellowish, a proof how perfectly white my diamond must be." but despite having remarkable clarity and excellent color, it was actually hard to find a buyer for it. It was offered to many of the European royal houses, but to no avail. A London dealer was offered a half share in it at the very low price of £12,500, but he declined. In 1863, an Indian Maharajah and an English cotton merchant traveled from India, the Maharajah was unable to afford the price asked: £40,000. The merchant, however, was captivated by the gem, and expressed a desire to acquire it himself, though he lacked the means to do so. As luck would have it, within a year of expressing this desire, the American Civil War stopped supplies of cotton from the southern states, and the commodity soared in value; hence the merchant was suddenly able to raise the money to buy the English Dresden

Finally in 1864, a broker approached Dresden on behalf of the English merchant of Bombay, bought the diamond from Dresden for £32,000, and sold it on to the merchant at the original price, making a commission of £8,000. The War in America finished and cotton prices again sunk, placing the merchant in an embarrassing financial position. The pressure largely led to his untimely unexpected demise. His estate had to besettled, and his executors were in the fortunate position of being able to sell on the already celebrated "Durban Drop", to cover the £40,000. This time the diamond was purchased by Malhār Rāo, the Gaekwad of the princely state of Baroda, in India.

In 1880, the Gaekwad had the diamond set in a necklace along with its sister stone the Star of the South, which he had also purchased. In 1948, the necklace was altered and more diamonds were added. Sita Devi, the Gaekwad's Maharani was photographed wearing it at her husband's birthday party.

== Name ==
The diamond is named after its first owner, but it was probably styled the "English Dresden" to distinguish it from a number of other famous diamonds with the same name: the Dresden Green, the Dresden White and the Dresden Yellow, which were kept in the German city of Dresden. It is also known as the "Dresden Drop" or the "Star of Dresden".

== See also ==
- List of diamonds
