= HAL Krishak =

Military observation aircraft produced in India

HAOP-27 Krishak
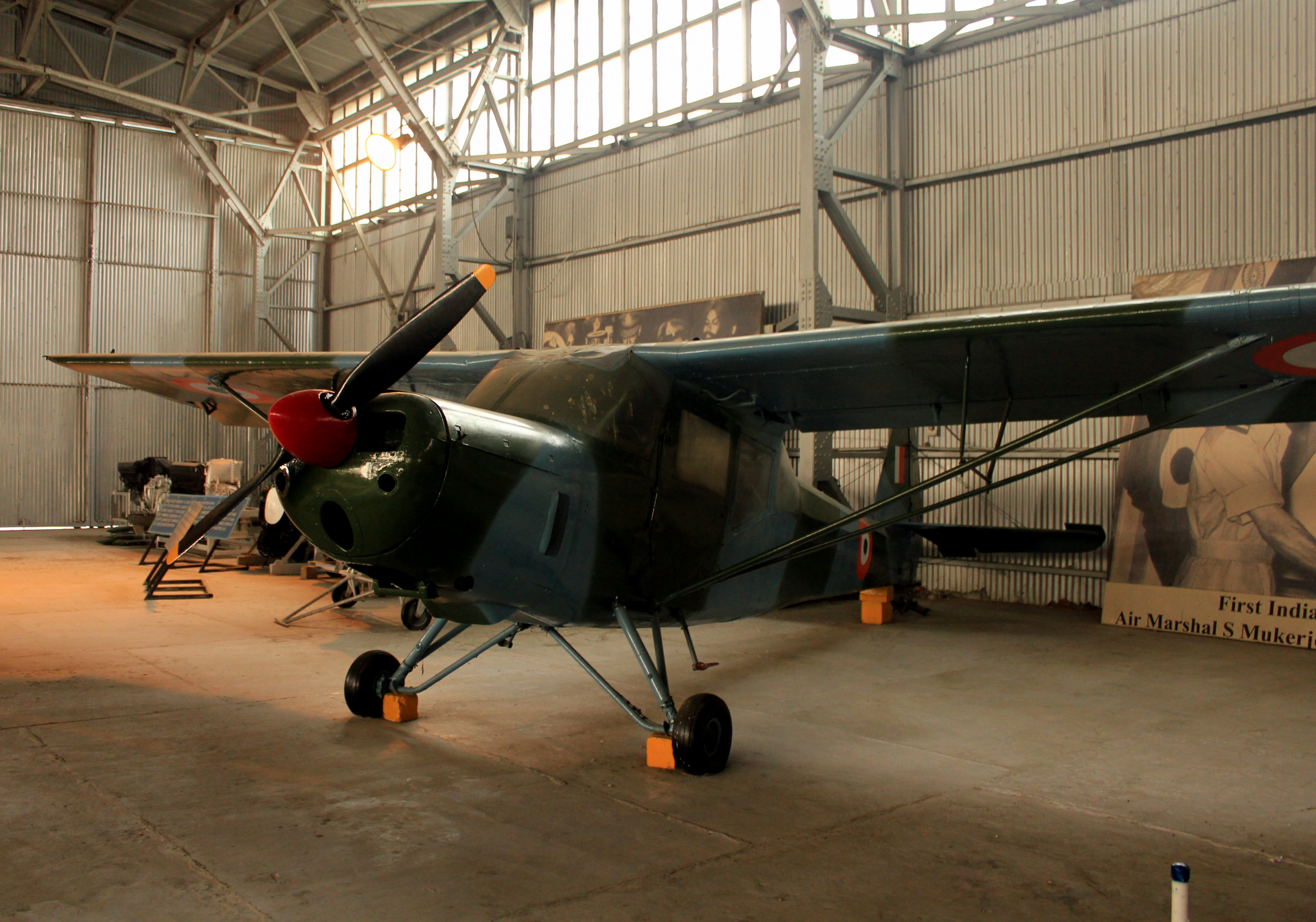
- HAL Krishak, display in Air Force Museum, Palam, New Delhi

General information
- Type: Observation aircraft
- National origin: India
- Manufacturer: Hindustan Aeronautics
- Status: Retired
- Primary user: Indian Army
- Number built: 70

History
- First flight: November 1959
- Developed from: HAL HUL-26 Pushpak

The HAL HAOP-27 Krishak (lit. 'Farmer') was a military observation aircraft produced in India in the 1960s. It was initially developed by Hindustan Aeronautics as an enlarged, four-seat version of the HAL Pushpak light aircraft.

Two prototypes were built, with the first flying in November 1959 and the second in November 1960. With no interest from buyers, the project was shelved until the Indian Army issued a requirement in the early 1960s for an aircraft to replace the Auster AOP.6 and AOP.9s then serving in the observation role. The original Krishak design was slightly revised to meet the new specification, and the type was adopted into service in 1965. The Krishak was phased out in the mid-1970s when it was replaced by the HAL Cheetah.

== Variants ==
Krishak
Used a Continental 190 hp engine
Krishak Mk.2
Used a Continental 225 hp engine

== Operators ==
India

- Indian Army

== Specifications (Krishak Mk.2) ==
Data from Jane's All The World's Aircraft 1966–67

General characteristics

- Crew: 2
- Capacity: 1 passenger
- Length: 8.41 m (27 ft 7 in)
- Wingspan: 11.43 m (37 ft 6 in)
- Height: 2.36 m (7 ft 9 in)
- Wing area: 18.58 m^{2} (200.0 sq ft)
- Gross weight: 1,270 kg (2,800 lb)
- Fuel capacity: 127 L (34 US gal; 28 imp gal) internal, provision for additional 64 L (17 US gal; 14 imp gal) auxiliary tank
- Powerplant: 1 × Continental O-470-J air-cooled flat-six, 168 kW (225 hp)
- Propellers: 2-bladed Hartzell variable-pitch propeller, 2.13 m (7 ft 0 in) diameter

Performance

- Maximum speed: 209 km/h (130 mph, 113 kn) at sea level
- Stall speed: 74 km/h (46 mph, 40 kn) flaps up, power on
- Range: 473 km (294 mi, 255 nmi) with auxiliary fuel tank
- Service ceiling: 5,940 m (19,490 ft)
- Rate of climb: 4.6 m/s (900 ft/min)

== See also ==
- Battle of Longewala

== Notes ==
=== References ===
- Taylor, John W. R. (1966). Jane's All The World's Aircraft 1966–67. London: Sampson Low, Marston & Company.
- Taylor, Michael J. H. (1989). Jane's Encyclopedia of Aviation. London: Studio Editions. p. 456.
- World Aircraft Information Files. London: Bright Star Publishing. pp. File 896 Sheet 02.
