= HAL HUL-26 Pushpak =

HUL-26 Pushpak
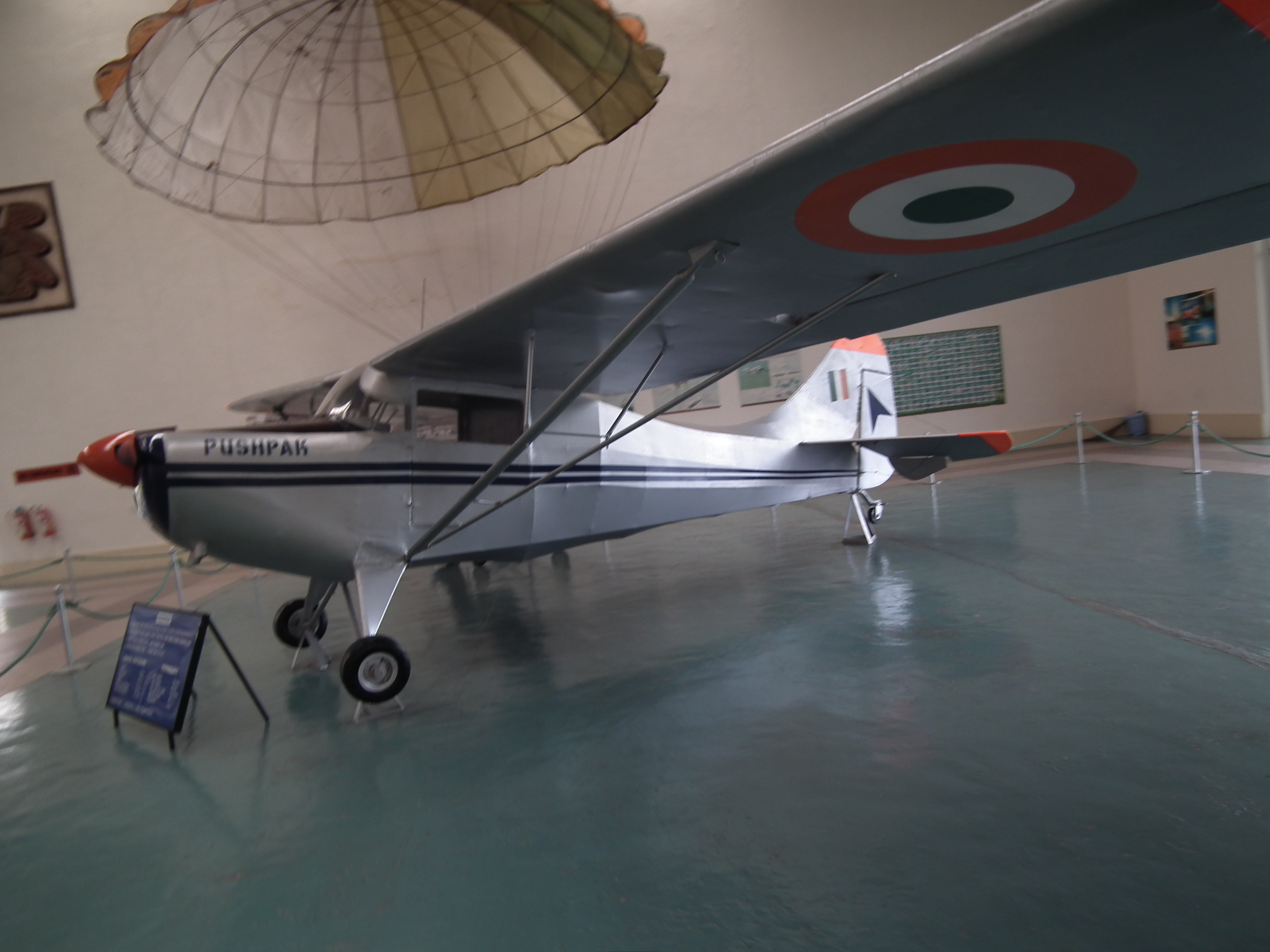
- HUL-26 Pushpak displayed at HAL Museum

General information
- Type: Two-seat cabin monoplane
- Manufacturer: Hindustan Aeronautics Limited
- Primary users: Aero clubs Private pilot owners
- Number built: 160+

History
- First flight: 1958
- Developed from: Aeronca Chief
- Developed into: HAL HAOP-27 Krishak

The Hindustan HUL-26 Pushpak (lit. 'Flower') was a 1950s Indian two-seat cabin monoplane designed and built by Hindustan Aeronautics Limited, based on the Aeronca Chief.

== Construction and operation ==
The Pushpak was a high-wing braced monoplane with a fixed tailwheel landing gear. The fuselage was built from metal tubing, the wing aluminum ribs on a wooden spar, all covered in fabric. The Pushpak first flew on 28 September 1958 and was powered by a 90 hp (67 kW) Continental flat-four engine.

Around 160 aircraft were produced for Indian flying clubs for use as basic trainers. Two examples were gifted to Malaysia and were later sold to private pilot owners in the United Kingdom. These examples remained in active operation in 2013.

== Operators ==
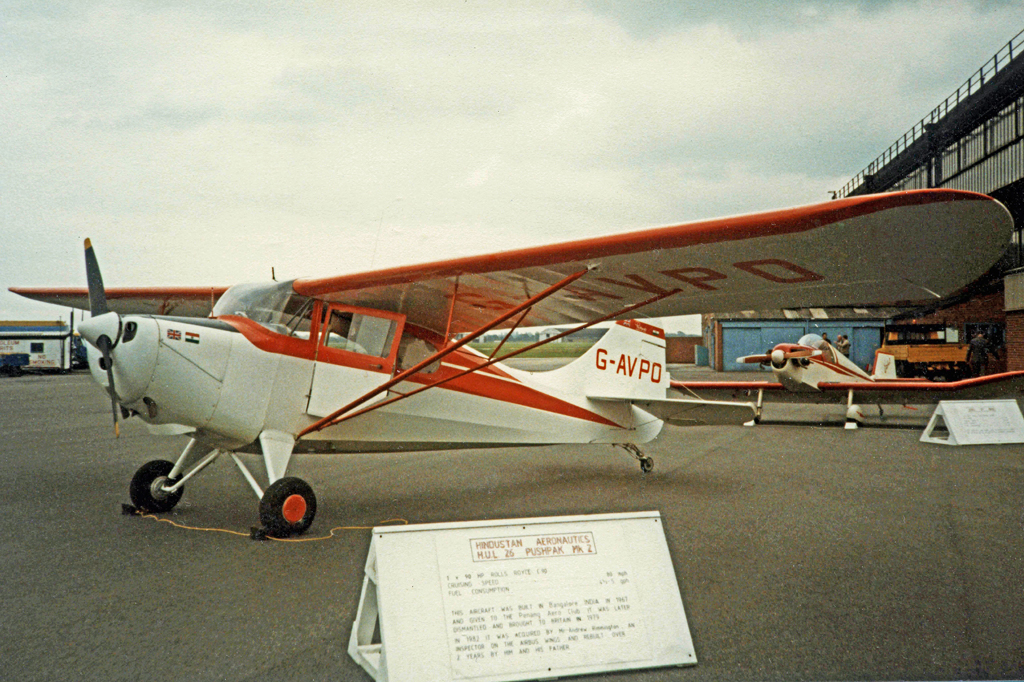
Airworthy Hindustan Pushpak privately owned in the United Kingdom

=== Former ===
India
Malaysia
United Kingdom
Sri Lanka

== Specifications (HUL-26) ==
Data from Jane's All The World's Aircraft 1965–66

General characteristics

- Crew: 2
- Length: 6.40 m (21 ft 0 in)
- Wingspan: 10.97 m (36 ft 0 in)
- Height: 2.77 m (9 ft 1 in)
- Wing area: 16.2 m^{2} (174 sq ft)
- Empty weight: 395 kg (871 lb)
- Max takeoff weight: 613 kg (1,351 lb)
- Fuel capacity: 56 L (12 imp gal; 15 US gal)
- Powerplant: 1 × Continental C90-8F air-cooled flat-four, 67 kW (90 hp)

Performance

- Maximum speed: 144 km/h (89 mph, 78 kn)
- Cruise speed: 112 km/h (70 mph, 60 kn)
- Range: 400 km (250 mi, 220 nmi)
- Endurance: 3 hr
- Service ceiling: 4,270 m (14,000 ft)
- Rate of climb: 2.5 m/s (500 ft/min)

== See also ==
Related development

- Aeronca Chief
