= Pearl Carpet of Baroda =

Carpet commissioned by the Maharaja of Baroda

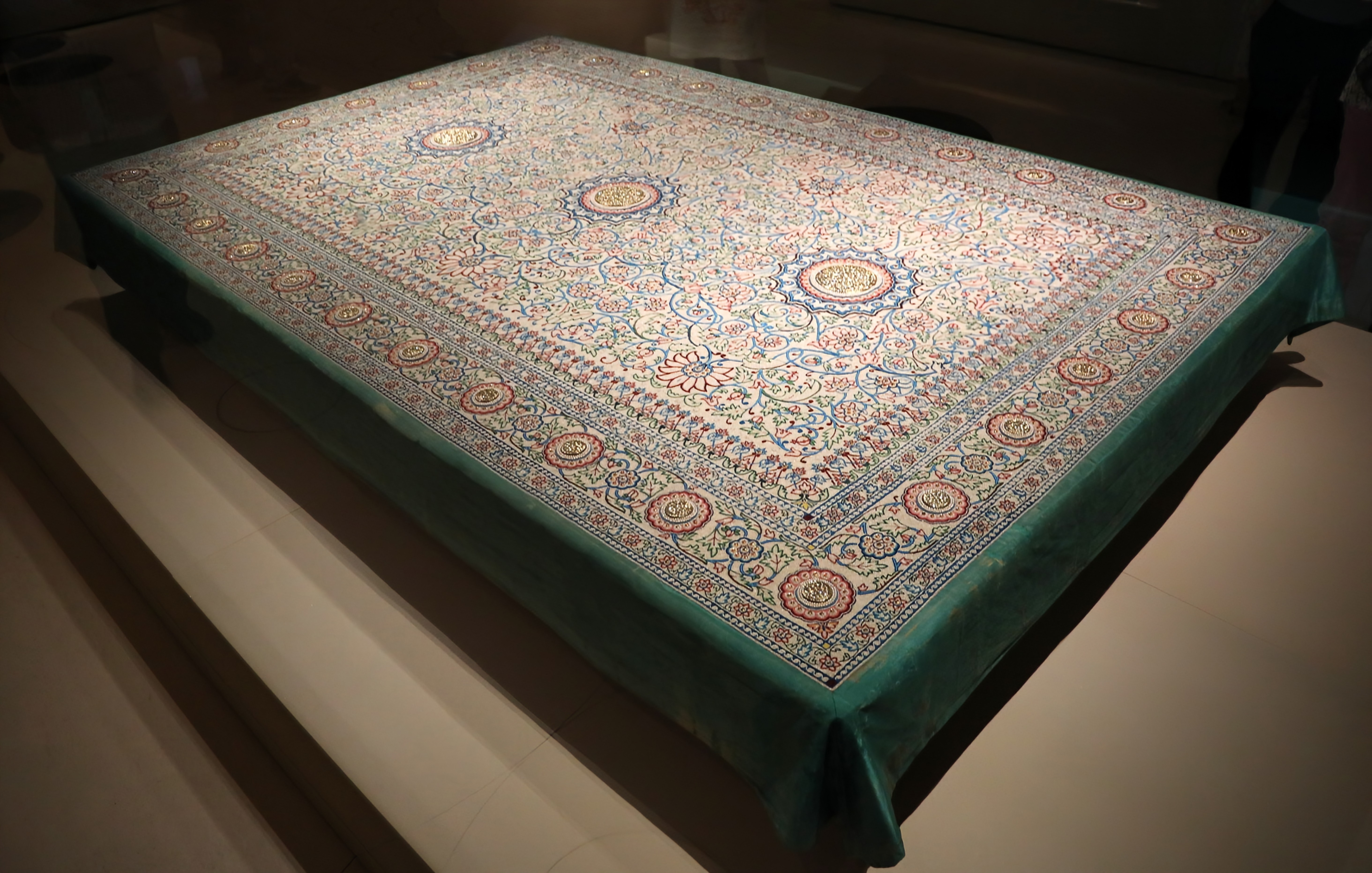
- Material: deerskin and silk, embellished with pearls, diamonds, rubies, and emeralds
- Length: 264 centimetres (104 in)
- Width: 173 centimetres (68 in)
- Created: around 1870 (Note: It is believed that the carpet was completed, but not sent to Medina at the time of the Maharaja's death, which was in 1870.)
- Present location: National Museum of Qatar

The Pearl Carpet of Baroda is a carpet that was commissioned by the Maharaja of Baroda. The National Museum of Qatar holds this carpet and regards this "embroidered masterpiece" as a highlight of its collection.

== History ==
Originally a part of the five-piece set, the carpet was commissioned by Khande Rao Gaekwad, the Maharaja of Baroda, in 1865. He intended to gift the carpet to adorn the Prophet's Tomb in Medina. However, the maharajah died in 1870 before it could be gifted and the pearl carpet remained in his family.

It was first exhibited in public at the Delhi Durbar in 1903, when it was still owned by the Gaekwad dynasty. The last Gaekwad royal to own it was Sita Devi, who took it with her to Monaco in 1946.

The carpet made its second appearance in public when it was displayed in 1985 at the Metropolitan Museum in New York. At a Sotheby's auction in Doha in 2009, an anonymous buyer bought it for $5.5 million. It is now a part of the permanent collection of the National Museum of Qatar.

The pearl carpet is one of the only two remaining pieces of the five-piece set, all of which were meant to be for prophet's tomb. The other piece is the Baroda Pearl Canopy, embroidered with the same Basra pearls and precious stones.

== Construction, Design, and Technique ==
The carpet consists of over 1.5 million pieces of "Basra", which are natural marine pearls originating from the coasts of Qatar and Bahrain. Although the carpet contains an abundance of pearls and diamonds, other stones such as colored glass beads, rubies, emeralds and sapphires are also included in the carpet's composition. The carpet underwent numerous rounds of conservation.

== See also ==
- Vadodara
- Khanderao Gaekwad
