= Hasur, Maharashtra =

Village in Maharashtra

Coordinates: 16°00′N 74°29′E

Hasur
- Village
- Interactive map of Hasur
- Country: India
- State: Maharashtra
- District: Kolhapur

Hasur is a village in Maharashtra, India. It is located in the Krishna River basin, in the Desh region. The village is a part of the Shirol taluka of Kolhapur district, Pune Division.

== Geography ==
The village is located 53 km towards East from District headquarters Kolhapur. 9 km from Shirol. 374 km from State capital Mumbai

The PIN code of Hasur is 416103, and the postal head office is Shirol.

Shedshal (2 km), Kanwad (2 km), Kavathe Guland (2 km), Kutwad (3 km), Shirati (5 km) are the nearby villages. Hasur is surrounded by Miraj Taluka towards North, Sangli Taluka towards North, Ichalkaranji Taluka towards west, Raybag Taluka towards South. Miraj, Sangli Ichalkaranji are the nearby cities to Hasur. The village lies on the border of the Kolhapur District and Sangli District.

== Transport ==
By Rail

Vijayanagar Rail Way Station, Shedbal Rail Way Station are the very nearby railway stations to Hasur. Nmg Tamdalge Rail Way Station (near to Ichalkaranji), Hatkanangale Rail Way Station (near to Ichalkaranji), Jayasingpur Rail Way Station (near to Jaysingpur), Vishrambag Rail Way Station (near to Jaysingpur) are the Rail way stations reachable from near by towns. However Sangli Rail Way Station is amajor railway station 20 km from Hasur

By Road

Kurundvad, Jaysingpur, Ichalkaranji are the nearby by towns to Hasur having road connectivity to Hasur

== Education ==
The village has one high school - the Hasur High School up to 10th std.
