= Baroda State =

Princely state of India (1721–1949)

Coordinates: 22.18°N 73.12°E

State of Baroda Baḍōdā rājya (Marathi) Barōḍā rājya (Gujarati)
- 1721–1949
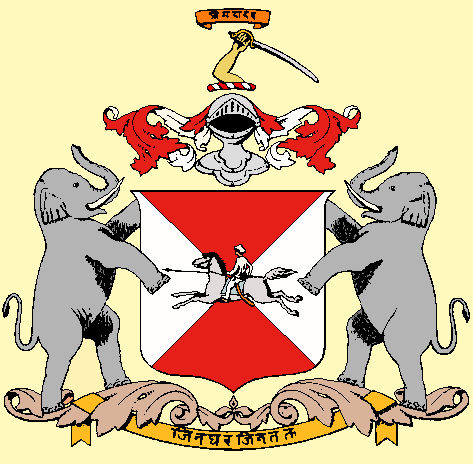
- Flag Coat of arms

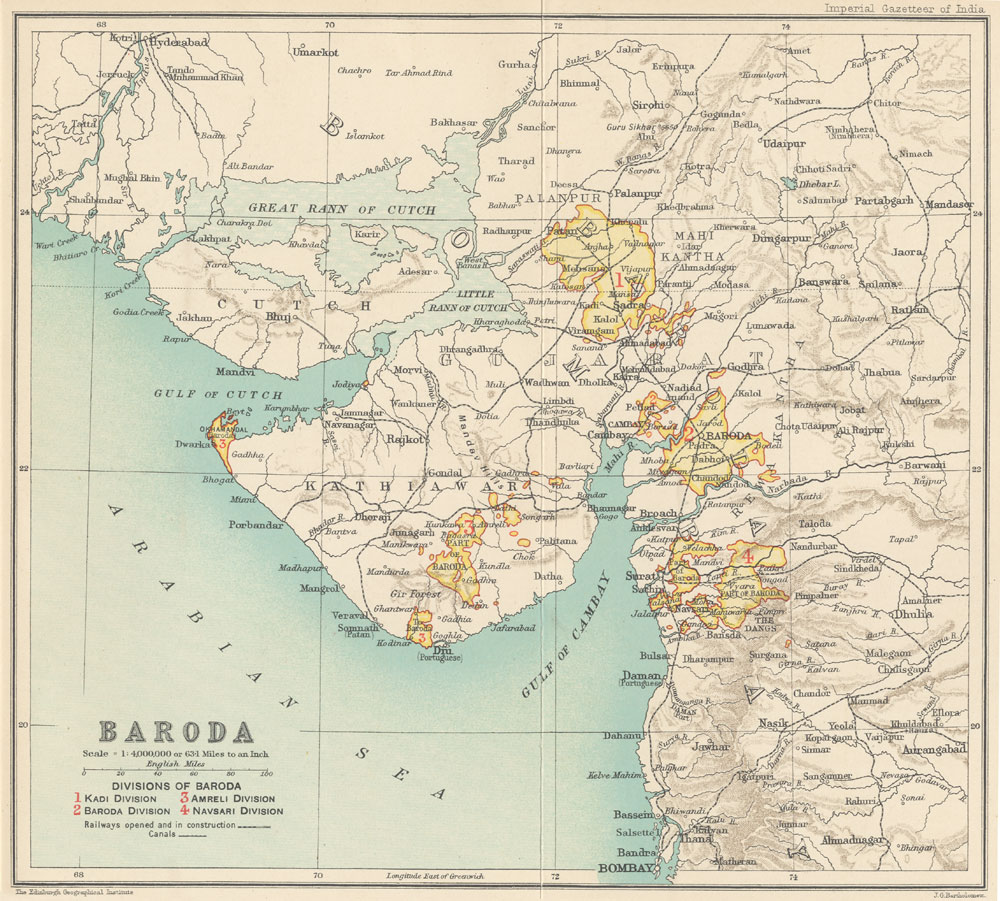
- Baroda State in 1901
- Status: State within the Maratha Empire (1721–1805); Protectorate of the East India Company (1805–1858); Princely State of the British Raj (1858–1947); State of the Dominion of India (1947–1949)
- Capital: Baroda
- Official languages: Marathi
- Religion: Hinduism (State); Islam; Jainism; Christianity; Zoroastrianism
- Demonym: Barodian
- Government: Monarchy
- Maharaja
  - 1721–1732 (first): Pilaji Rao Gaekwad
  - 1939–1949 (last) (Note: before abolition and dilusion in the Republic of India): Pratap Singh Rao Gaekwad
- History
  - Established: 1721
  - Merger into India: 1949
Preceded by	Succeeded by
Maratha Confederacy	Dominion of India
- Today part of: India ∟ Gujarat
- "A Catalogue of Manuscript and Printed Reports, Field Books, Memoirs, Maps ..." Vol. iv, "Containing the treaties, etc., relating to the states within the Bombay presidency"

Baroda State was a kingdom within the Maratha Empire, and later, a princely state of the British Indian Empire in present-day Gujarat. It was ruled by the Gaekwad dynasty from its formation in 1721 until its accession to the newly formed Dominion of India. With the city of Baroda as its capital, its relations with the British Raj authorities were managed by the Baroda Residency, with the State under British suzerainty. The revenue of the state in 1901 was Rs. 13,661,000. Baroda merged into the Dominion of India on 1 May 1949, preceding which an interim government was formed in the state.

== History ==
=== Early history ===
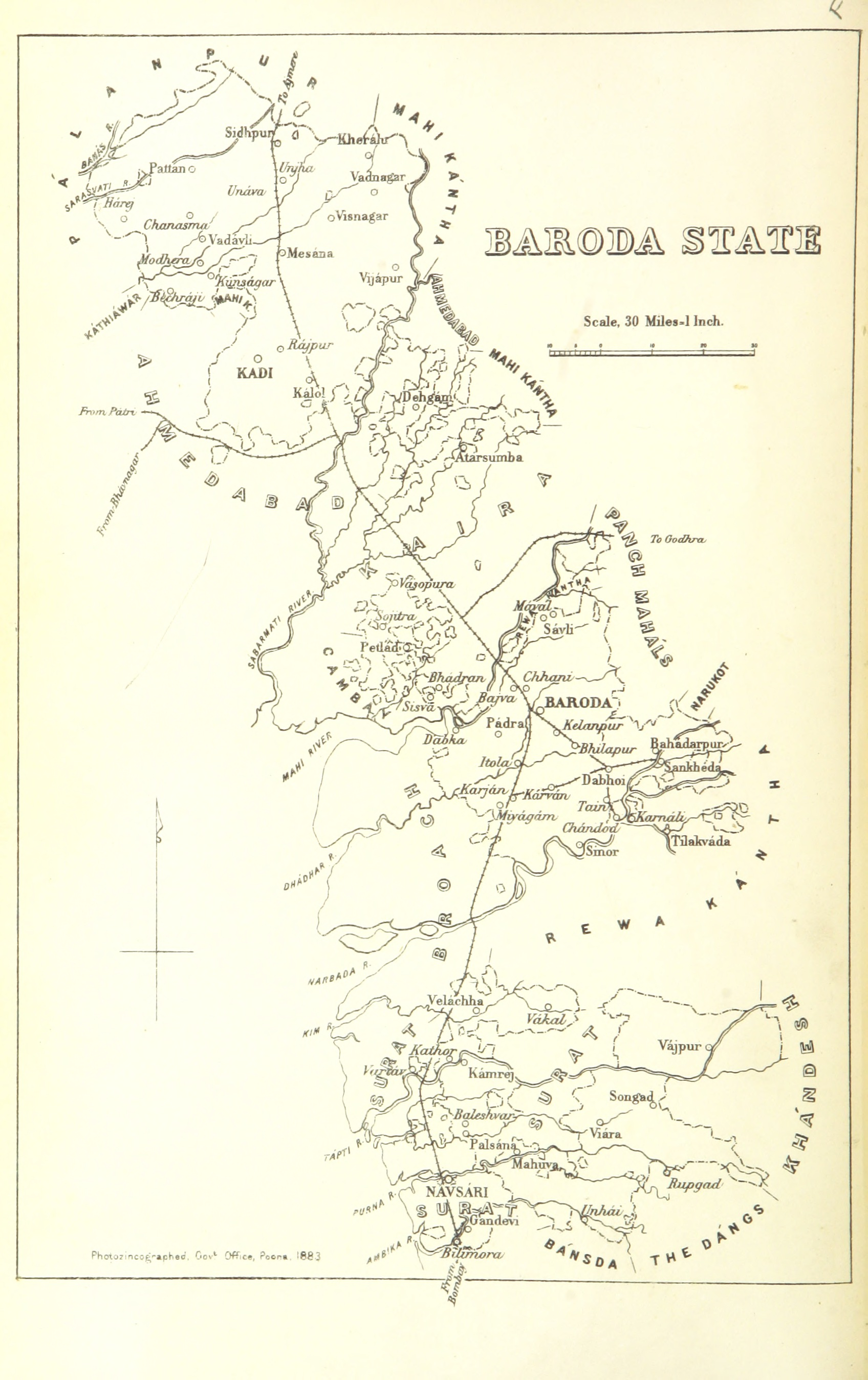
Baroda State, 1896

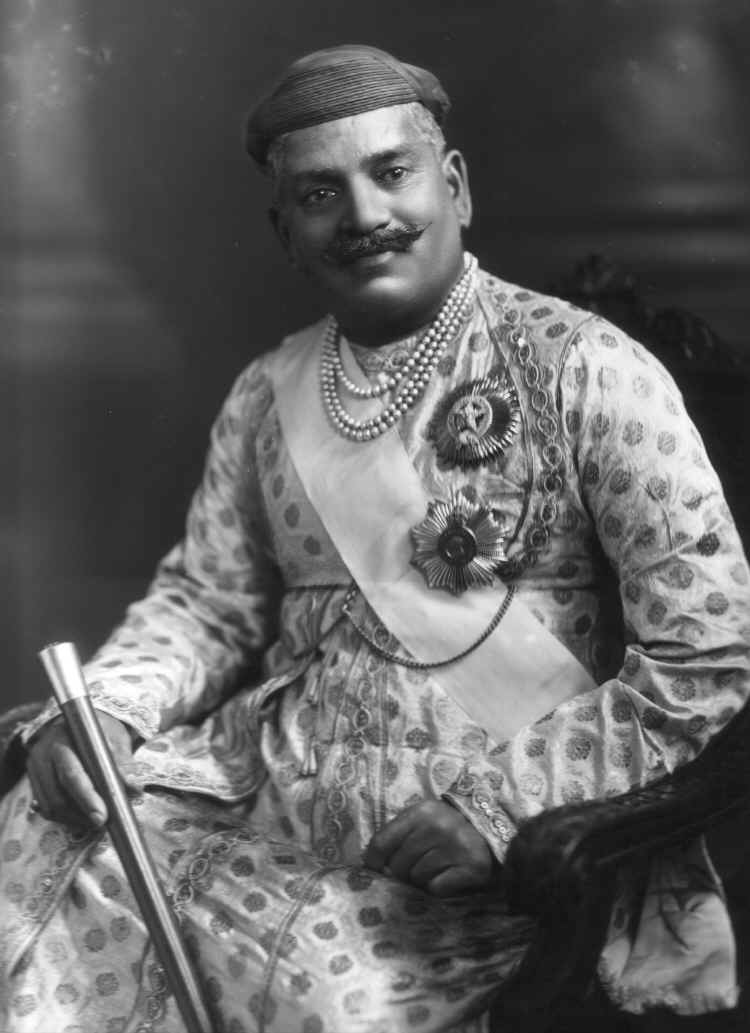
Sir Sayajirao Gaekwad III (1863–1939), Maharaja of Baroda

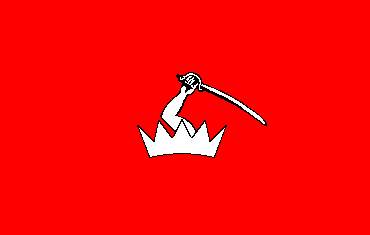
Baroda State. Standard of the Maharaja (1874–1936)

Last standard of the Maharaja (1936–1949)

Baroda derives its native name Vadodara from the Sanskrit word vatodara, meaning 'in the heart of the Banyan (Vata) tree. It also has another name, Virakshetra or Virawati (land of warriors), mentioned alongside Vadodara by the 17th century Gujarati poet Premanand Bhatt, native to the city. Its name has been mentioned as Brodera by early English travellers and merchants, from which its later name Baroda was derived. Geographically it comprised several disjointed tracts of land, measuring over 1000 square miles, spread across the present Gujarat state; these were subdivided into four prant (states), namely Kadi, Baroda, Navsari and Amreli, which included coastal portions of the state, in the Okhamadal region near Dwarka and Kodinar near Diu.

The Marathas first attacked Gujarat in 1705. By 1712, a Maratha leader Khande Rao Dabhade grew powerful in the region and when he returned to Satara in 1716, he was made the senapati (commander in chief). Thereafter, during the "Battle of Balapur" in 1721, one of his officers, Damaji Gaekwad, was awarded the title Shamsher Bahadur or Distinguished Swordsman. Damaji died in 1721 and was succeeded by his nephew Pilajirao.

Thus, the Baroda State was founded in 1721 when the Maratha general Pilaji Gaekwad conquered Songadh from the Mughals. Preceding this, Pilajirao was appointed as general by the Peshwa, the Prime Minister of the Maratha Empire, to collect revenues from Gujarat; the latter had captured the region north and south of Surat from the Mughals to established the Sarkar of Surat. Songadh remained the headquarters of the "House of Gaekwad" until 1866. After the Second Anglo-Maratha War (1803–1805), the East India Company wrested control of much of Gujarat from the Marathas. However, the Gaekwads of Baroda (Vadodara) acknowledged British suzerainty and control of the state's external affairs in return for retaining nominal internal autonomy.

=== Princely state ===
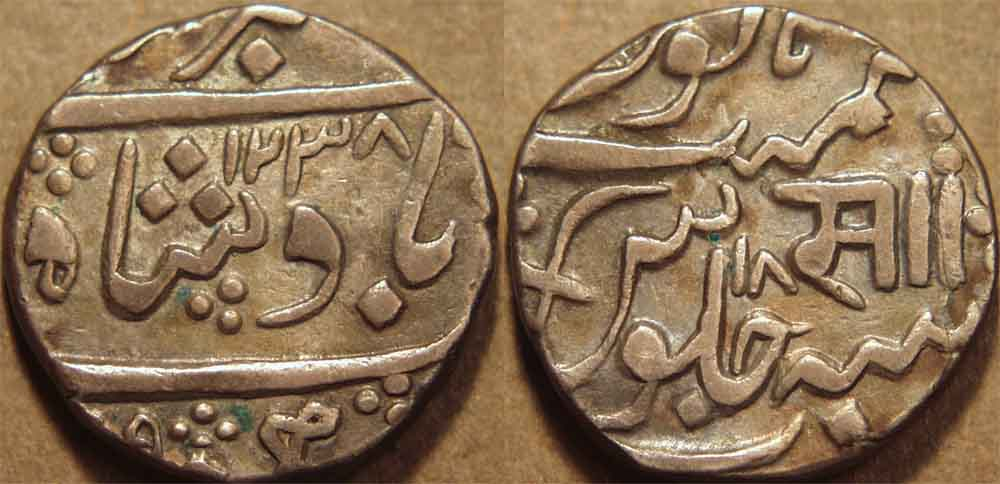
Silver rupee of Sayaji Rao II of Baroda (ruled 1819–47), naming the Mughal emperor Muhammad Akbar II, dated AH 1238 (= 1822–23 CE). The prominent Nagari letter sa stands for Sayaji Rao and we also see a curved sword, one of the dynastic symbols of the Gaekwads and seen also on the Baroda state flag.

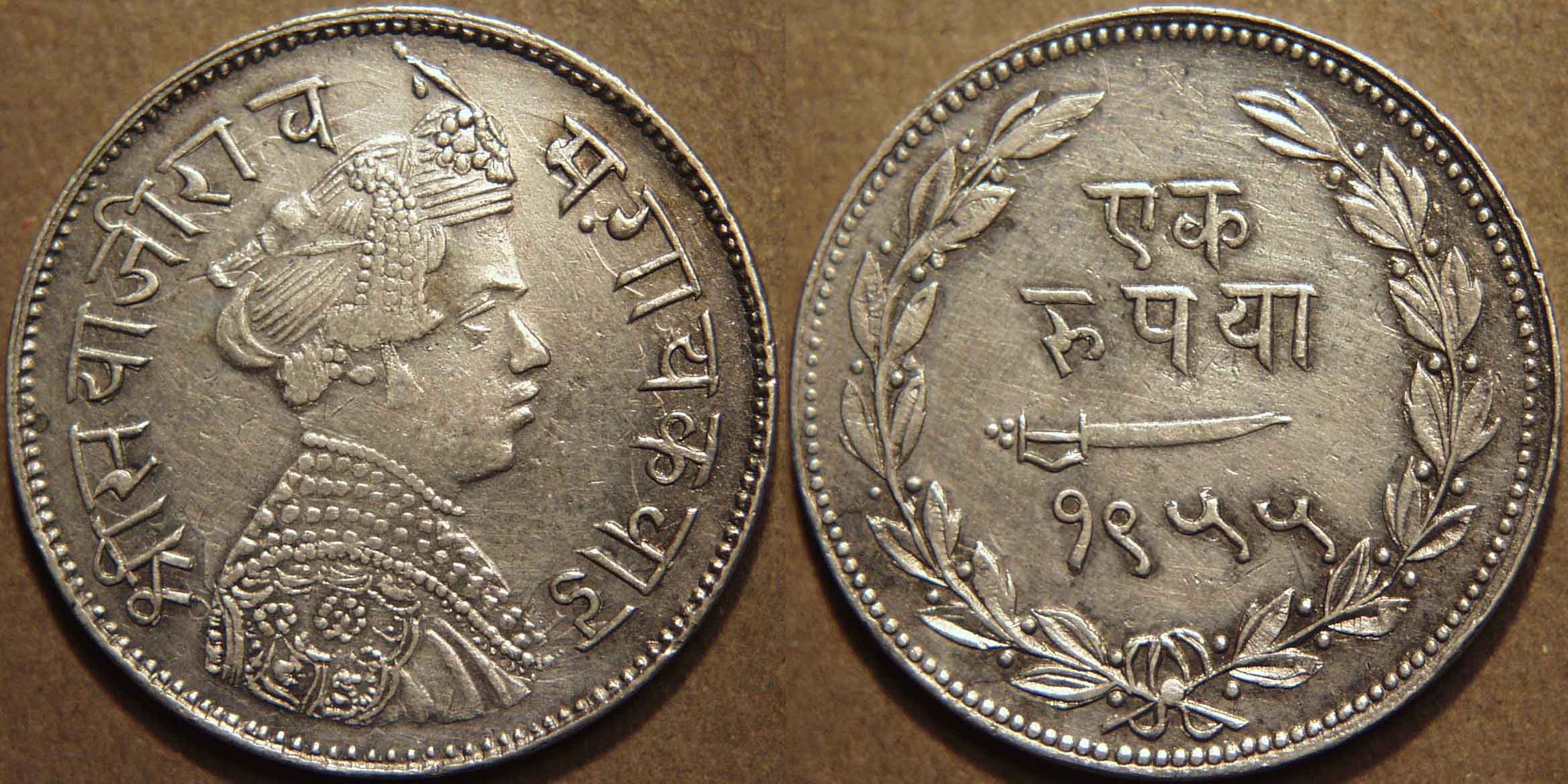
Silver rupee of Sayaji Rao III of Baroda (ruled 1875–1939), showing his portrait. This coin is dated 1955 in the Vikrama era (= 1897 CE).

Following the death of Khanderao Gaekwad (1828–1870), the popular Maharaja of Baroda, in 1870, it was expected that his brother, Malharrao (1831–1882), would succeed him. However, Malharrao had already proven himself to be of the vilest character and had been imprisoned earlier for conspiring to assassinate Khanderao. As Khanderao's widow, Maharani Jamnabai (1853–1898) was already pregnant with a posthumous child, the succession was delayed until the gender of the child could be proven. The child proved to be a daughter, and so upon her birth on 5 July 1871, Malharrao ascended the throne.

Malharrao spent money liberally, nearly emptying the Barodan state coffers (he commissioned a pair of solid gold cannon and a carpet of pearls, among other expenses) and soon reports reached the Resident of Malharrao's gross tyranny and cruelty. Malharrao further attempted to cover up his deeds by poisoning the Resident, Colonel R. Phayre C.B. with a compound of arsenic. By order of the Secretary of State for India, Lord Salisbury, Malharrao was deposed on 10 April 1875 and exiled to Madras, where he died in obscurity in 1882. With the throne of Baroda now vacant, Maharani Jamnabai called on the heads of the extended branches of the dynasty to come to Baroda and present themselves and their sons in order to decide upon a successor.

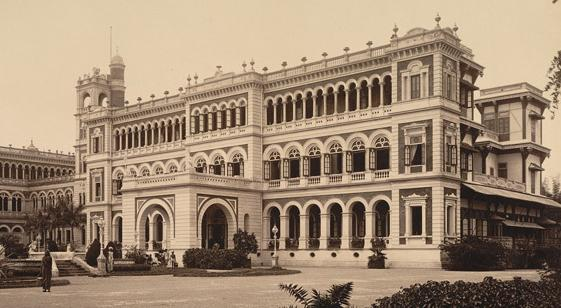
Makarpura Palace, built by Maharaja Khende Rao in 1870.

Kashirao and his three sons, Anandrao (1857–1917), Gopalrao (1863–1938) and Sampatrao (1865–1934) walked to Baroda from Kavlana, a distance of some 600 kilometres, to present themselves to Jamnabai.

Eventually, Gopalrao was selected by the British Government as successor and was accordingly adopted by Maharani Jamnabai on 27 May 1875. He was also given a new name, Sayajirao. On 16 June 1875, he ascended the throne as Sayajirao Gaekwad III, but being a minor, reigned under a Council of Regency until he came of age and was invested with full ruling powers on 28 December 1881. founding numerous institutions. During the hunting season in 1933, he was saved from lion by two boys of Dhari town, Arjan Koli and Hari Koli. After that both Koli brothers were respected in open court (Baroda state darbar) and their bronze statues were established in royal Sayaji Baug (Kamati Baug) by Sayajirao Gaekwad.

=== 20th century ===
Various important state institutions were founded in the early 20th century, including the Bank of Baroda on 20 July 1908. In 1908, Sayajirao also founded the Baroda Legislative Assembly (also known as the Baroda Dhara Sabha).

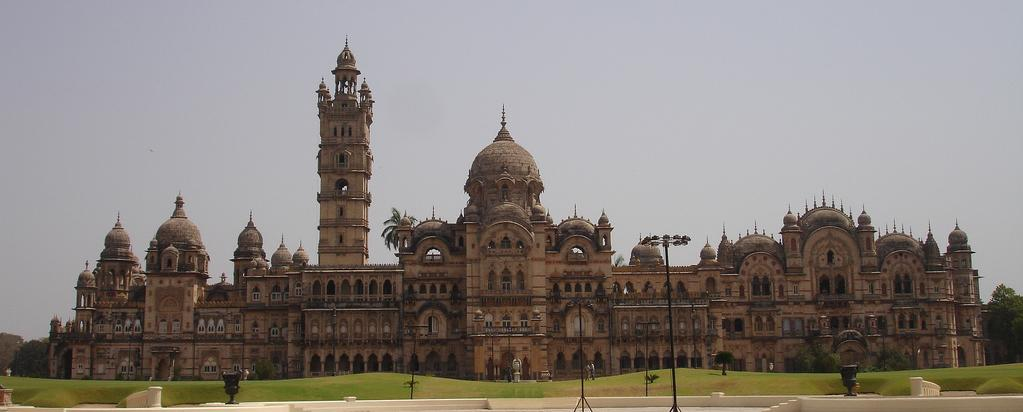
Laxmi Vilas Palace, Baroda, built by Maharaja Sayajirao Gaekwad III in 1890

By the beginning of the 20th century, the relations of the British with the four largest princely states—Hyderabad, Mysore, Jammu and Kashmir, and Barodawere—were managed by a British Resident under the direct authority the Governor-General of India. In 1911, Baroda State spanned 3,239 km^{2} (1,251 mi^{2}), and the population was 2,032,798 persons as per the 1911 census of India. The state was wealthy. The Pittsburgh Press reported in 1927 that the diamond necklace, which contained the Star of the South diamond, was a part of a royal collection worth $10,000,000 at the time, housed in the Nazarbaug Palace (built 1721) in Baroda city; another important part of the collection was a cloth embroidered with precious stones and seed pearls, made to cover the tomb of Mohammed. The Qatar National Museum now holds the Pearl Carpet of Baroda as one of its treasures.

B.R.Ambedkar wrote about his experience with untouchability in Baroda in the second chapter of his autobiographical book, Waiting for a Visa.

In 1937, the princely states of the Baroda Residency were merged with those of the agencies adjacent to the northern part of the Bombay Presidency — Rewa Kantha Agency, Surat Agency, Nasik Agency, Kaira Agency and Thana Agency — in order to form the Baroda and Gujarat States Agency. A few years before independence, the process of the 'Attachment Scheme' began in order to integrate the smallest princely states, estates and thanas. Baroda State was one of the main beneficiaries of this measure by being able to add about 15,000 km^{2} and half a million inhabitants to the state. The merged states were Pethapur on 1 February 1940, the Katosan Thana, with Deloli, Kalsapura, Maguna, Memadpura, Rampura, Ranipura, Tejpura, Varsora, the Palaj Taluka and both Ijpura States between June and July 1940. These were followed on 10 July 1943 by the states of Ambliara, Ghorasar, Ilol, Katosan, Khadal, Patdi, Punadra, Ranasan, Wasoda and Wao Also many small Talukas of the region were merged. On 24 July 1943 Sachodar State and a few small places that had no own jurisdiction were annexed. By December of the same year the small states of Bajana, Bhilka, Malpur, Mansa and Vadia met the same fate.

On 5 November 1944, the Baroda and Gujarat States Agency was merged with the Western India States Agency (WISA) to form the larger Baroda, Western India and Gujarat States Agency.

After the independence of India, which initially did not include Baroda or many other princely states, an interim government under Prime Minister Jivraj Narayan Mehta, son-in-law of Manubhai Mehta, then Dewan of Baroda state, was inaugurated in the State on 4 September 1948, by the then Maharaja at a special Durbar in the Laxmi Vilas Palace, Baroda. Finally, on 1 May 1949, Baroda State, the third largest state at the time of British India, formally merged into the Dominion of India, Initially, Baroda merged with the Bombay state, whereafter, on 1 May 1960, when the two new states of Gujarat and Maharashtra were formed, it became part of Gujarat, with Jivraj Narayan Mehta becoming the first Chief Minister of Gujarat.

== Koli revolt ==
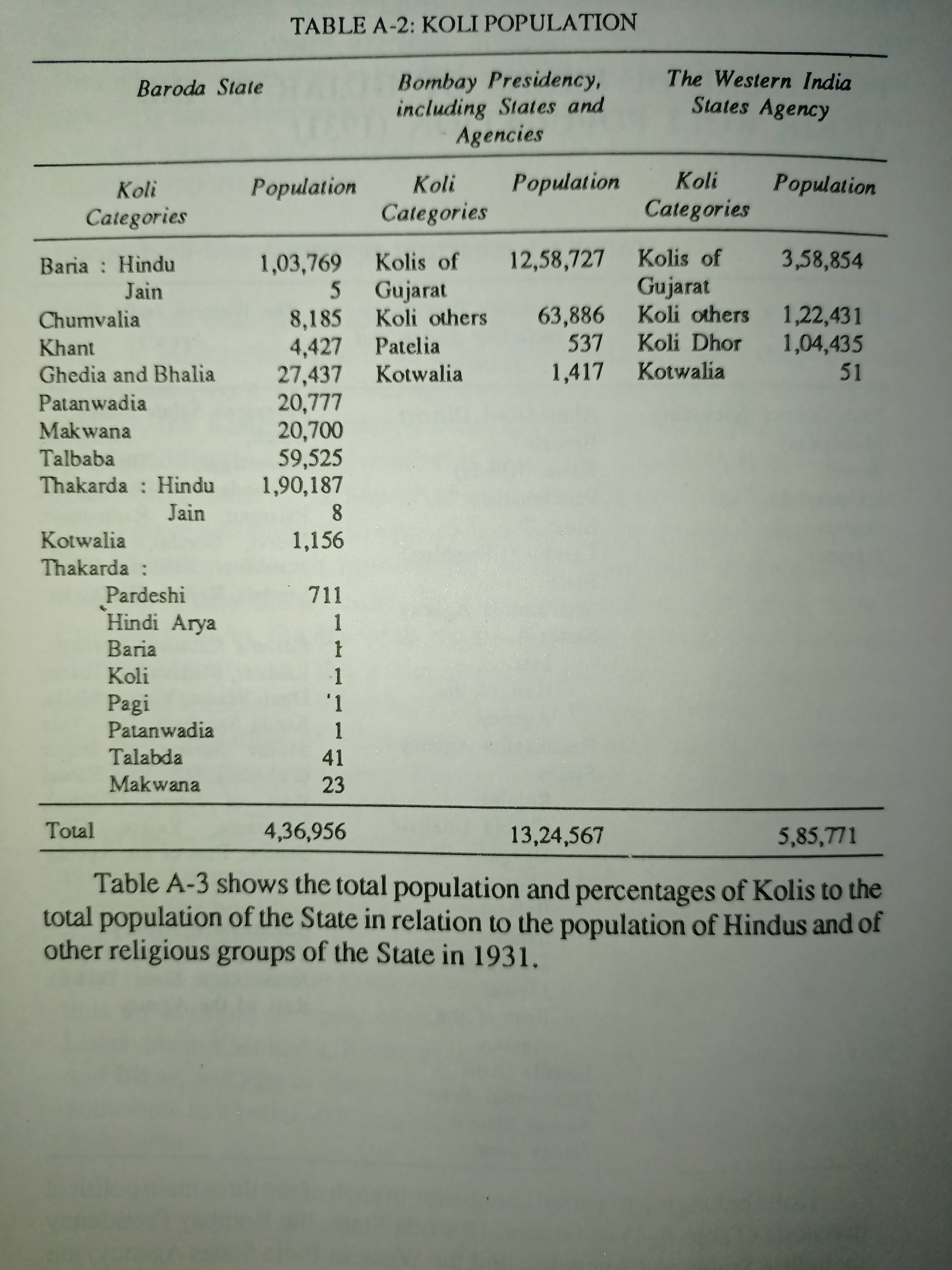
Koli population in Baroda State in 1931

The Koli rebellion was led by two brothers Nathaji Patel and Yamaji Patel, chiefs of Chandap Taluq. During the great Indian Rebellion of 1857, the Kolis of Chandap under Nathaji and Yamaji planning for revolt and Gaekwad of Baroda received that news. So Gaekwad stationed his cavalry at Chandap to control the rebels. But cavalry of Gaekwad was killed and thrown out by Kolis of Chandap. After that Kolis went into Taranga hills and continued their rebellion for few months. In the end of October 1857, the combined forces of British, Idar State and Baroda attacked Kolis and burnt the Chandap village.

In north-west Gujarat, around the southern tip of the Aravali, a number of Koli Talukdars revolted against the triumvirate of the British, Gaekwad and Raja of Idar. Together, these three forces burnt down two Koli villages towards the end of 1857. The Koli chieftains collected an army of 2000 Koli- and Bhil soldiers and attacked Gaekwadi villages near present day Gandhinagar. Adopting guerrilla tactics, they continued their resistance till the end of 1858. While Koli chiefs fought around the river Sabarmati. The Kolis paid a huge price for their resistance to British and Baroda. They were not only defeated in battle and punished for having dared to resist but, in the aftermath, kolis were marginalized by the rest of society as outlaws. Being arms-bearing community, they too were disarmed in early 1858 and also forced to practise agriculture.

== Baroda State Railway ==
The state owned the Gaekwar's Baroda State Railway (GBSR), which started in 1862 as the first narrow-gauge in India. It consisted of 8 miles (13 km) of narrow gauge track from Dabhoi to Miyagam. The railway network extended to Goyagate, Chandod, Bodeli and Samalaya Jn with Dabhoi as its focal point. After independence in 1949 this railway merged with the Bombay, Baroda and Central India Railway. The lines are under conversion to broad gauge currently.

== Baroda State Navy ==
In late 18th century, the Baroda state established a Naval set up at Billimora, a port about 40 miles south of Surat, known as Bunder Billimora Suba Armor. Here a fleet of 50 vessels was stationed, which included mostly sails, cargo vessels for trading and military vessels to secure the sea from Portuguese, Dutch and French.

When political alignments changed, after the Second Anglo-Maratha war, a joint expedition of British and Barodan state troops under Colonel Walker, then resident of Baroda, approached Kathiawad in 1808, and eventually obtained bonds from the chiefs of Okha-mandal and from the maritime states of Kathiawad renouncing piracy. Then in 1813, the Barodan government acquired the parganah of Kodinar (in present Junagadh district), where at port of Velan a small fleet of four frigates with 12-pounder guns on each for the protection of the trade between Bombay and Sindh was established. These four armed vessels were named Anandprasad, Sarsuba, Anamat Vart and Anne Maria, which was purchased from the Shah of Iran, and was known as 'Shah Kai Khusru' until then.

== Gaekwad Maharajas of Baroda ==
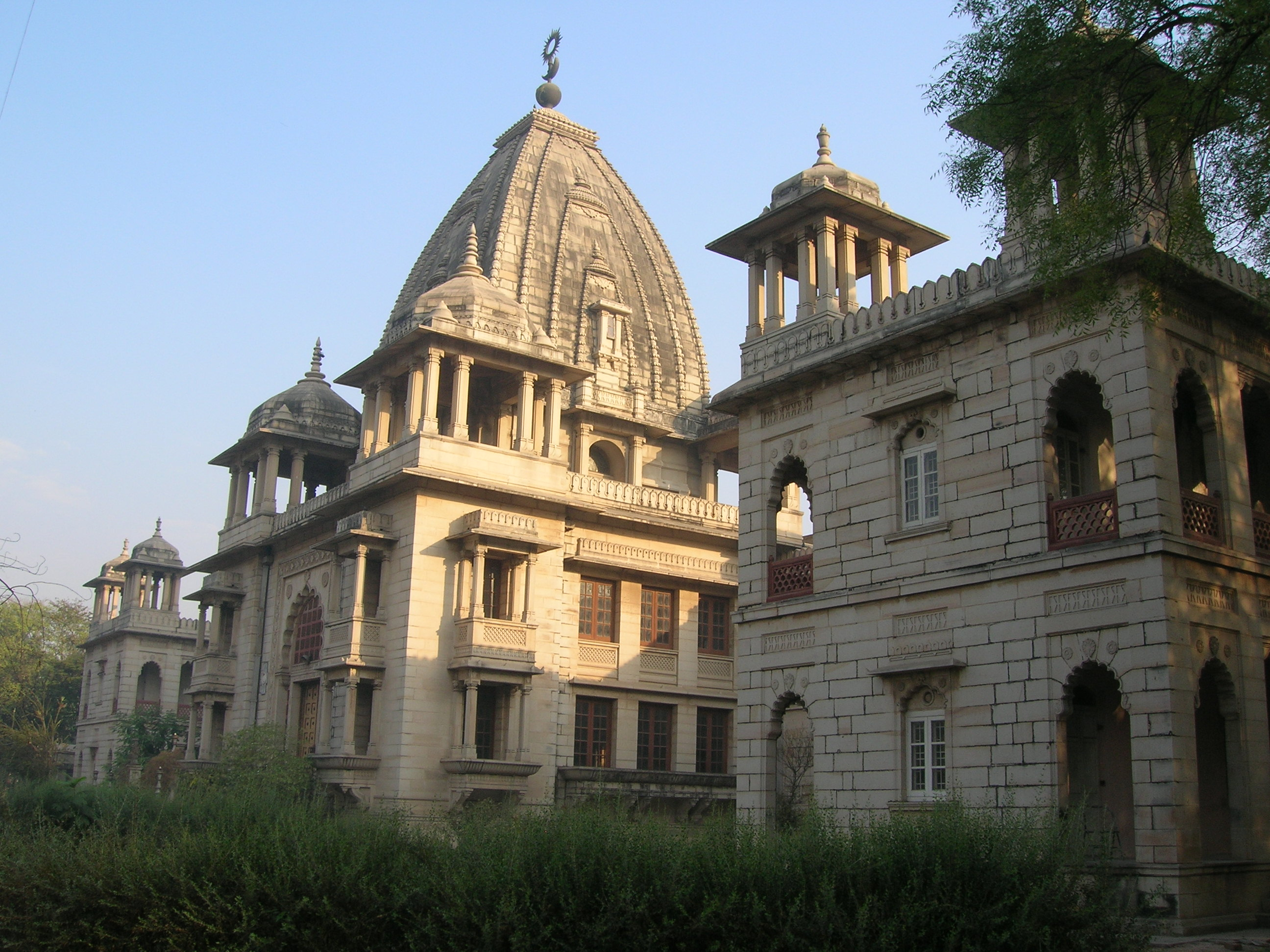
Kirti Mandir, the cenotaph of the Gaekwads in Baroda.

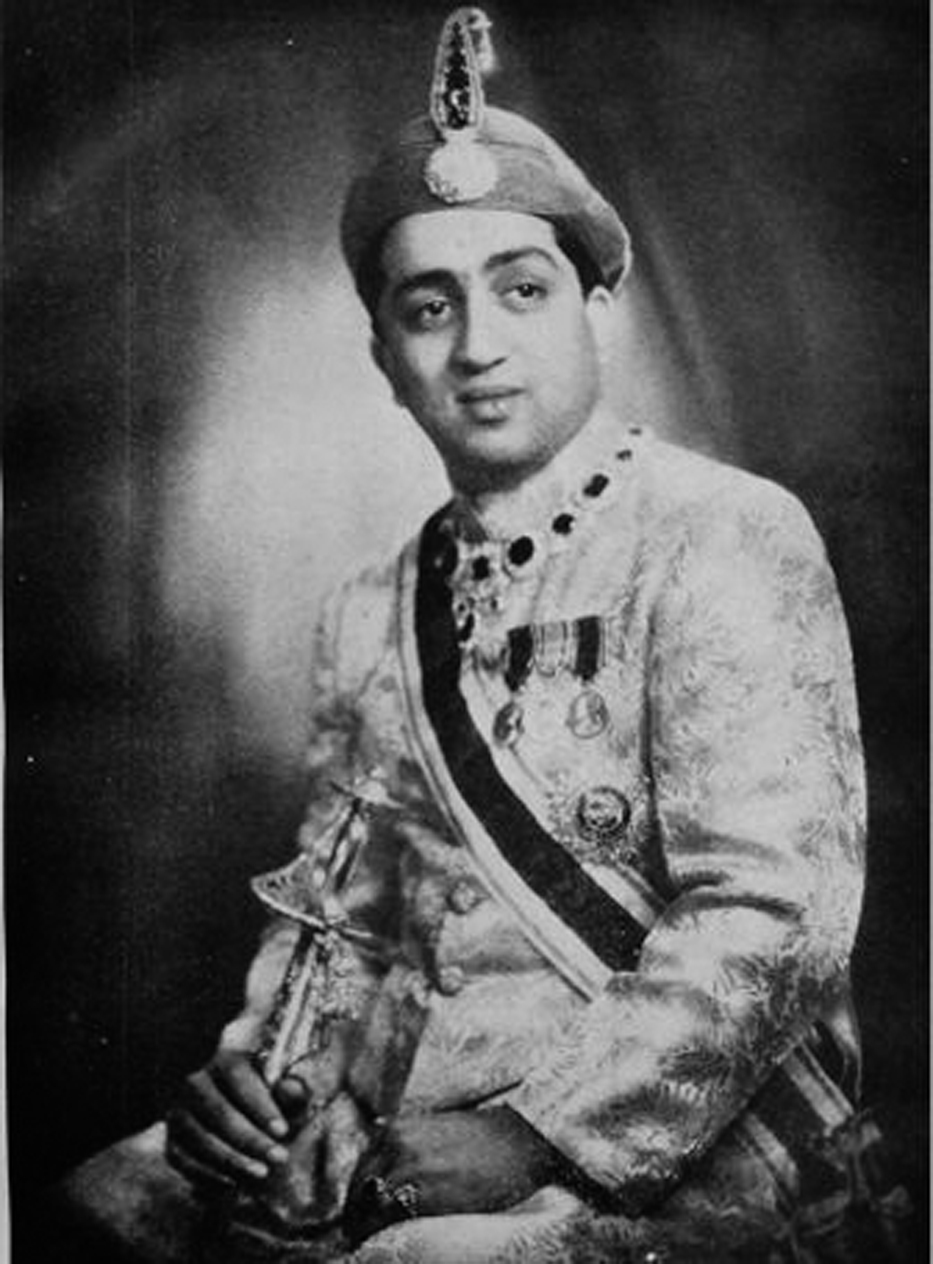
Pratap Singh Rao Gaekwad

- Pilaji Rao Gaekwad (1721–1732)
- Damaji Rao Gaekwad (1732–1768)
- Sayaji Rao I Gaekwad (1768–1778)
- Fateh Singh Rao Gaekwad (1778–1789)
- Manaji Rao Gaekwad (1789–1793)
- Govind Rao Gaekwad (1793–1800)
- Anand Rao Gaekwad (1800–1818)
- Sayaji Rao Gaekwad II (1818–1847)
- Ganpat Rao Gaekwad (1847–1856)
- Khande Rao Gaekwad (1856–1870)
- Malhar Rao Gaekwad (1870–1875)
- Sayajirao Gaekwad III (1875–1939)
- Pratap Singh Rao Gaekwad (1939–1951); ruled from 1939 to 1947, serving as nominal ruler to his death in 1951

=== Titular Maharajas ===
- Fatehsinghrao Gaekwad II (1951–1988), titular Maharaj of Baroda until 1971 when all royal titles in India were officially abolished in 1971 following the ratification of the Twenty-sixth Amendment of the Constitution of India by Indira Gandhi's government.

=== Later descendants ===
- Ranjitsinh Pratapsinh Gaekwad (1988–2012)
- Samarjitsinh Gaekwad (2012–present)

=== Present line of succession to the Baroda throne ===
The Gaekwad dynasty follows the standard of male primogeniture in matters of succession. The present line of succession is as follows:

1. Sangramsinhrao Gaekwad, the Heir Presumptive (6 August 1941–). Uncle of the present Maharaja.
2. Pratapsinhrao Sangramsinhrao Gaekwad (26 August 1971–). Only son of Sangramsinhrao Gaekwad.
3. Rajkumar Sayajirao Khanderao Gaekwad (6 April 1947–). Great-grandson of Sayajirao Gaekwad III by the Maharaja's younger son Shivajirao (1890–1919) and through Shivajirao's son Khanderao (1916–1991). Has two daughters.
4. Anandrao Khanderao Gaekwar (1948–2024). Younger brother of Sayajirao Khanderao Gaekwad. Has two sons.
5. Shivajirao Anandrao Gaekwar (21 September 1983–). Elder son of Anandrao Khanderao Gaekwad.
6. Udaysinghrao Anandrao Gaekwar (4 December 1990–). Younger son of Anandrao Khanderao Gaekwad.
7. Kr Jeetendrasinh Gautamsinhrao Gaekwad (4 Nov 1960–), son of Gautamsinhrao Bhadrasinhrao Gaekwad (1936–2006). Great Grandnephew of Maharaja Sayajirao III. Great Grandson of the Maharaja's late elder brother Anandrao, Himmat Bahadur, CIE (1857–1917). Grandson of Anandrao's son 'Rajyakarya Dhurandhar' 'Dewan' 'Barrister' Bhadrasinhrao Anandrao Gaekwad, CIE (1896–1946).
8. Satyajitsinhrao Duleepsinhrao Gaekwad (3 March 1962–). Great-grandnephew of Sayajirao Gaekwad III through the Maharaja's elder brother Anandrao, Himmat Bahadur, CIE (1857–1917), through Anandrao's son Chandrasinhrao (born 1894–?) and through his grandson Duleepsinhrao (b. c. 1920–?)
9. Yudeepsinhrao Satyajitsinhrao Gaekwad (2001–). Son of Satyajitsinhrao.

== Orders of chivalry ==
The Royal House of Baroda awarded the Most Noble Order of the Rising Sun in three grades, classed as Udayaditya, Vikramaditya, and Arunaditya. This order of chivalry was established during the reign of Maharaja Sayajirao Gaekwad III. Being made of gold, the breast star is arranged as follows:

Twenty four centrifugally arranged petal-shaped diamond studded strips alternating with shorter but similar strips, fanning out from two red enamelled, diamond-bordered circles, inscribed at the top Satyameva Jayate (Truth Shall Triumph). Within the inner circle a diamond encrusted Sirpech (pagri-shaped crown with royal pendant-shaped decoration rising upwards from the front of the crown) resting on a diamond encrusted sword below, which, on a strip of red enamel, the inscription in gold, Vadodara Raj (Baroda State)

== Diwans of Baroda ==
List of Diwans of Baroda:

- Bhau Shinde – (17 November 1867 – 24 November 1869)
- Nimbaji Rao Dhole (acting) – (25 November 1869 – November 1870)
- Hariba Dada – (November 1870 – March 1871)
- Gopal Rav Mairal – (22 March 1871 – 1872)
- Balwant Rao Bhicaji Rahurakar – (1872–72) (4 months)
- Balvantrav Khanvelkar – (November 1872 – March 1873)
- Shivaji Rao Khanvelkar – (5 March 1873 – 4 August 1874)
- Dadabhai Naoroji – (4 August 1874 – 7 January 1875)
- Rajah Sir T. Madhava Rao – (16 May 1875 – 28 September 1882)
- Khan Bahadur Kazi Shahabuddin – (29 September 1882 – 31 July 1886)
- Diwan Bahadur Lakshman Jagannath Vaidya – (1 August 1886 – 30 May 1890)
- Diwan Bahadur Manibhai Jashbhai – (31 May 1890 – 21 November 1895)
- Diwan Bahadur S. Srinivasa Raghavaiyangar – (15 July 1895 – 2 July 1901)
- Diwan Bahadur R. V. Dhamnaskar – (3 October 1901 – 30 June 1904)
- Kersaspji Rustamji Dadachanji – (1 July 1904 – 28 February 1909)
- Romesh Chunder Dutt, I.C.S – (1 June 1909 – 30 November 1909)
- Rahim Suleman Theba, I.C.S – (1 December 1909 – 3 January 1912)
- Behari Lal Gupta, I.C.S – (4 January 1912 – 16 March 1914)
- V. P. Madhava Rao – (17 March 1914 – 7 May 1916)
- Manubhai Nandshankar Mehta – (8 May 1916 – 1927)
- V. T. Krishnamachari – (1927–1944)
- Bhadrasinh Anandrao Gaekwar – (1944–1945)
- Sir Brojendra Lal Mitter – (1945–1947)
- Sakharam Amrit Sudhalkar – (October 1947 – June 1948)
- Jivraj Narayan Mehta – (1 June 1948 – 1 May 1949)

== Historiography ==
In 2007, Gujarat State Department of Archives started digitising 600,000 files, including Baroda state registers, prints, maps, abhinandan patra or maan patra (felicitation letters) offered to the erstwhile King by different provincial states and organisation, aagna patrika (gazette), huzur orders, and volumes of letters exchanged and agreements of the princely state with other provincial states and the British Raj, currently housed at the 'Southern Circle Record Office' at Vadodara, where a permanent exhibition had also been set up.

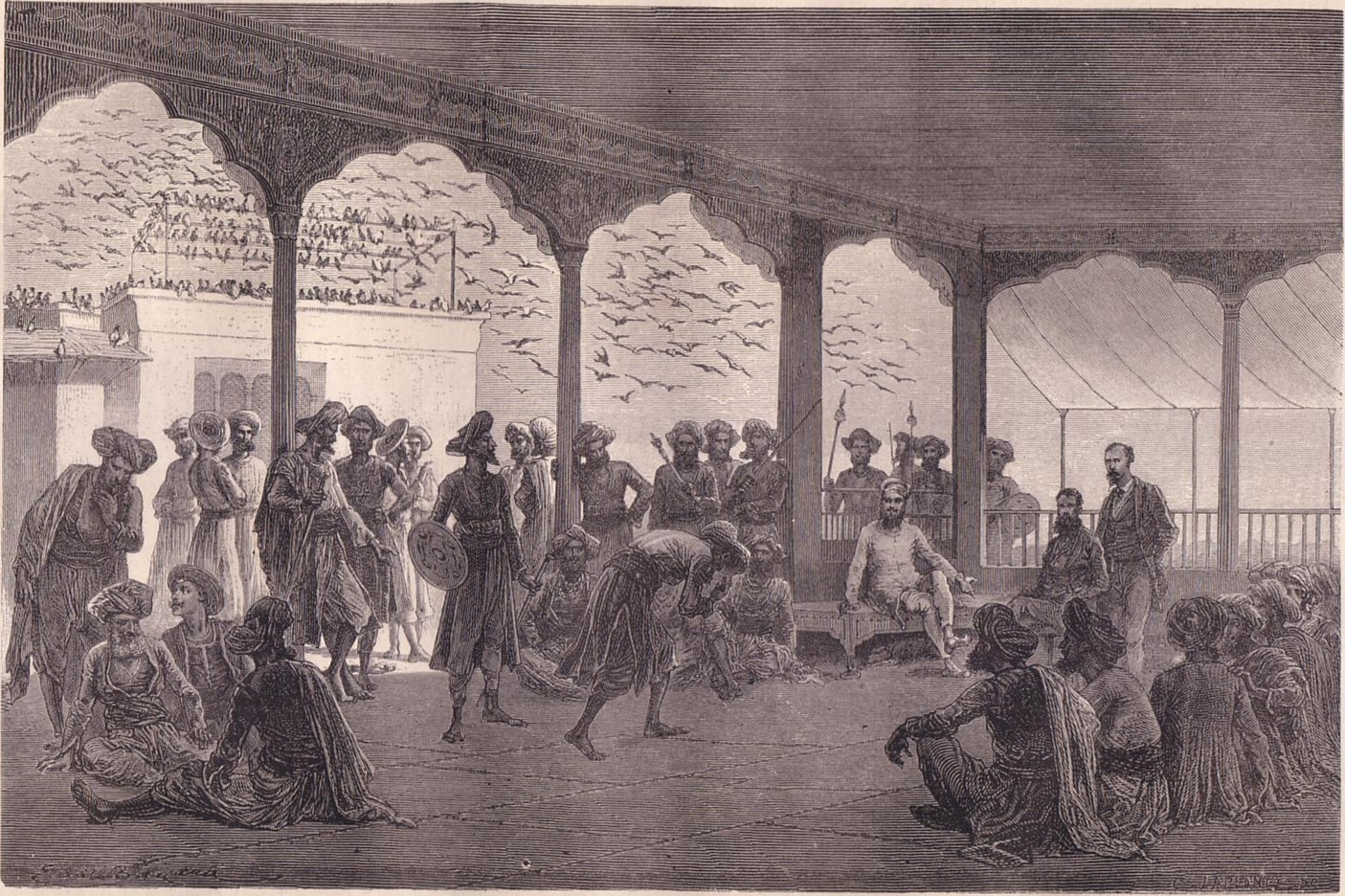
The Gaekwar in his palace

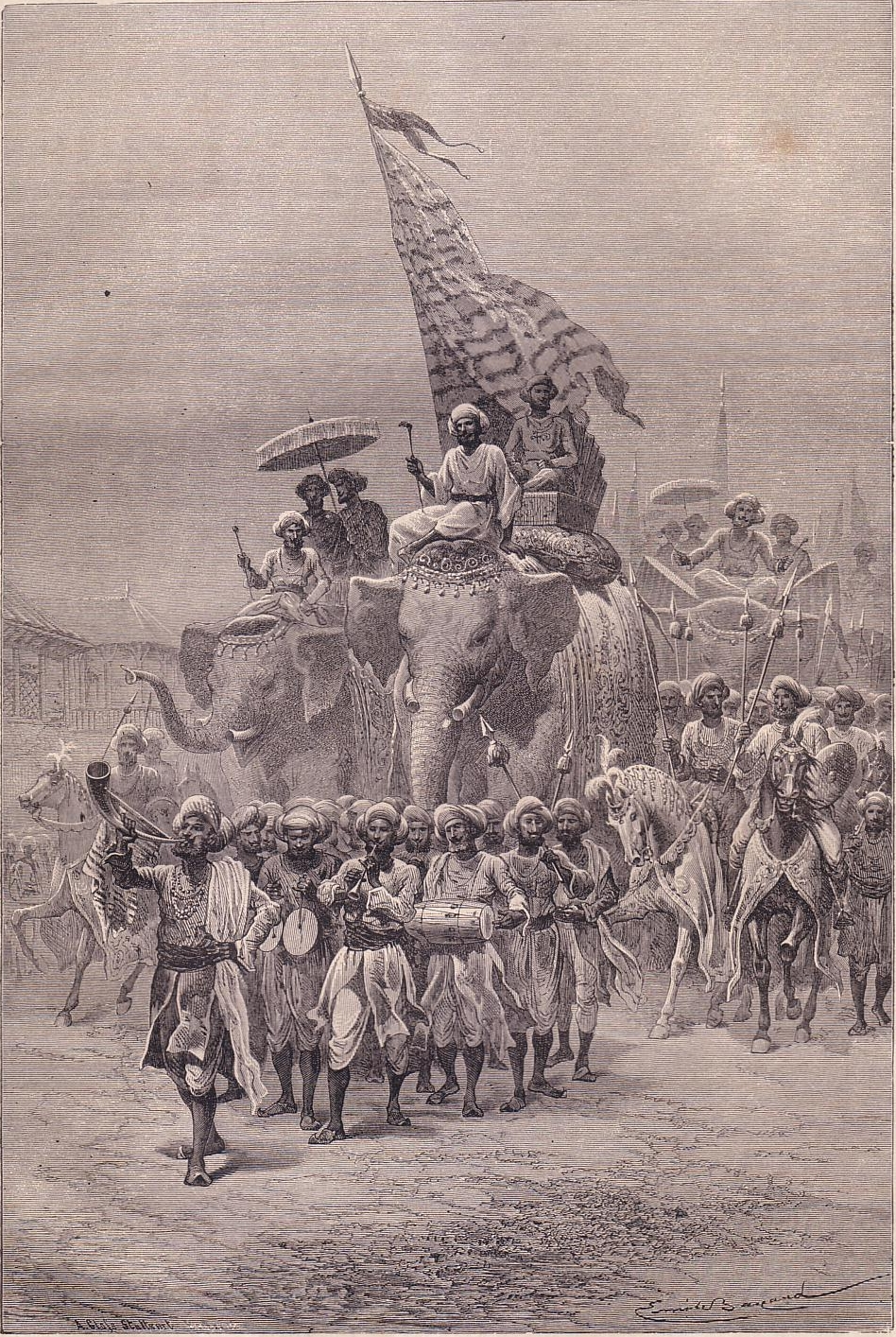
Procession in 1872

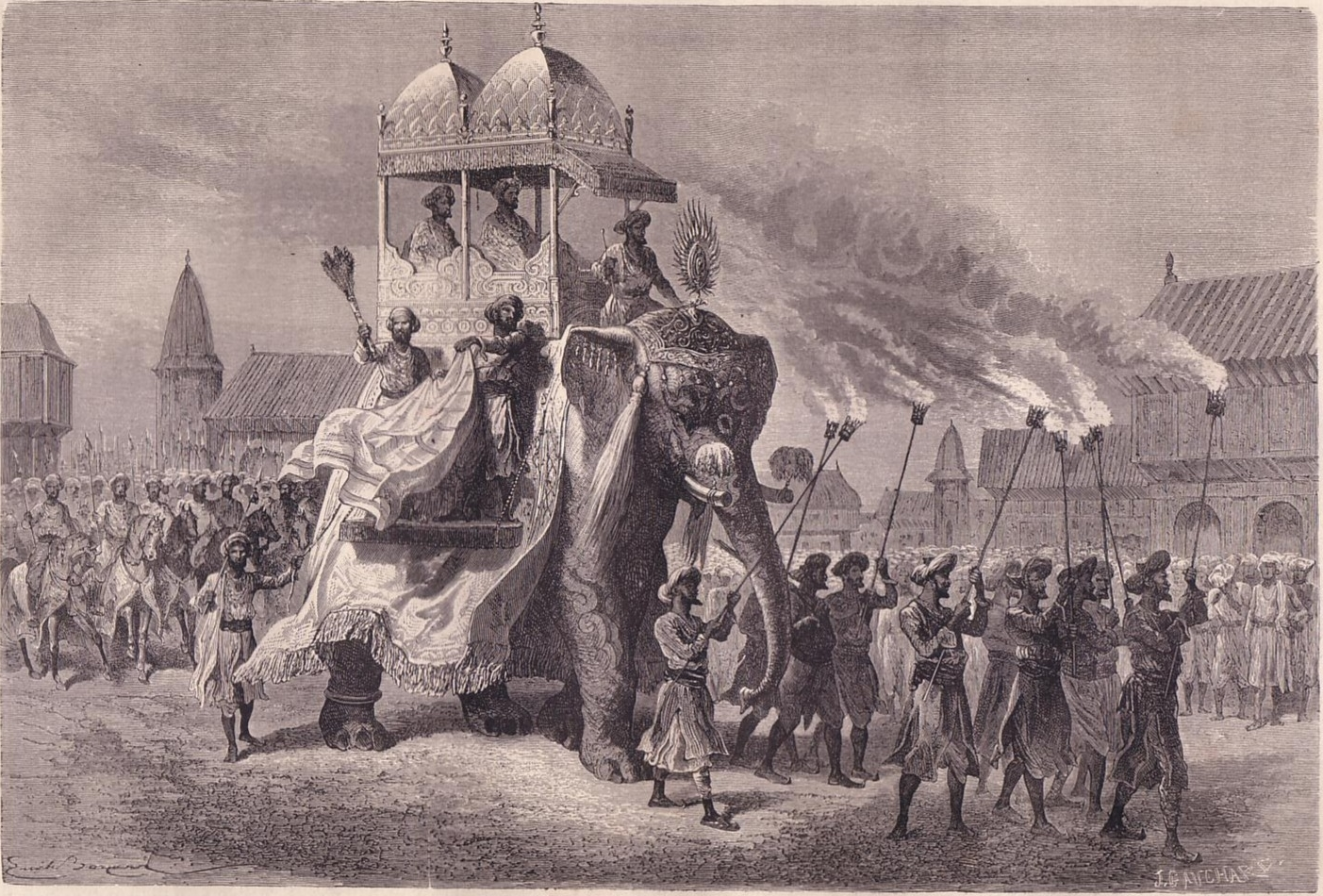
Baroda king on the Great Sowari royal procession

== See also ==
- Political integration of India
- List of Maratha dynasties and states
- Maratha Empire
- Red Ensign
- Hyderabad State
