= Gujarat under Alamgir II =

The Mughal Empire's province Gujarat (now in India) was under attack of the Marathas since last half century. The chief Maratha houses, Gaikwar and Peshwa had made peace with each other and driven out the Mughal nobles under the emperor Alamgir II. One such noble, Momin Khan, had countered their advances and recovered Ahmedabad in 1756 lost to the Marathas few years ago. After a long siege, Ahmedabad fell again in hands of the Marathas. The Marathas levied tributes across Gujarat. In 1759, the English of the British East India Company captured Surat. Sadashiv Ramchandra was appointed as a viceroy by Peshwa in 1760 followed by Apa Ganesh in 1761. Following defeat of Marathas in the Third Battle of Panipat (1761), the nobles briefly recovered towns from the Marathas but soon had to surrender. Thus the Marathas firmly established themselves in Gujarat.

== Gujarat under Alamgir II (1754–1759) ==
At Delhi, during 1754, the emperor Ahmad Shah Bahadur was deposed, and Âzíz-ud-dín, son of Jahándár Sháh, was raised to the throne with the title of Alamgir II.

Maratha leader Bhagvantráv who was held captive was released and he established himself in the Cambay fort of Nápád and not long after began to attack Mughal noble Momín Khán's villages.

Contest with Momín Khán Renewed, 1754

After several doubtful engagements peace was concluded on Momín Khán paying Rupees 10,000 on account of the usual share of the Maráthás which he had withheld. This arrangement was made through the mediation of Tukáji, the steward of Sadáshiv Dámodar, who had come to Gujarát with an army and orders to help Bhagvantráv. As Momín Khán had no ready money Tukáji offered himself as security and Bhagvantráv and Tukáji withdrew to the Dakhan. Momín Khán's soldiery now clamoured for pay. As he was not in a position to meet their demands he sent a body of men against some villages to the west belonging to Limbdi and plundered them, dividing the booty among his troops. In the following year, 1755, Momín Khán went to Ghogha, a port which, though at one time subordinate to Cambay (Khambhat), had fallen into the hands of Sher Khán Bábi, and was now in the possession of the Peshwa's officers. Ghogha fell and leaving a garrison of 100 Arabs under Ibráhím Kúli Khán, Momín Khán returned to Cambay, levying tribute. He then sent the bulk of his army under the command of Muhammad Zamán Khán, son of Fidá-ud-dín Khán, and Varajlál his own steward, to plunder and collect money in Gohilwad and Kathiawad. Here they remained until their arrears were paid off, and then returned to Cambay. After this Momín Khán plundered several Petlad villages and finally, in concert with the Kolis of Dhowan, attacked Jambusar and carried off much booty. Momín Khán next marched against Borsad, and was on the point of taking the fort when Sayáji, son of Dámáji Gáikwár, who lived at Baroda, hearing of Momín Khán's success, came rapidly with a small body of men to the relief of the fort and surprised the besiegers. Momin Khan's troops soon recovered from the effects of the surprise, and Sayáji fearing to engage them with so small a force retired. On Sayáji's departure, Momín Khán raised the siege of Borsad and returned to Cambay.

Momín Khán recovers Áhmedábád, 1756

In 1756, the rains were very heavy, and the walls of Áhmedábád fell in many places. Momín Khán, hearing of this as well as of the discontent of the inhabitants, resolved to capture the city. He sent spies to ascertain the strength of the garrison and set about making allies of the chief men in the province and enlisting troops. About this time Rághoji, the Marátha deputy, was assassinated by a Rohilla. As soon as Momín Khán heard of Rághoji's death he sent his nephew, Muhammad Zamán Khán, with some men in advance, and afterwards himself at the close of the year, 1756, marched from Cambay and camped on the Vatrak River. From this camp they moved to Kaira (Kheda), and from Kaira to Áhmedábád. After one or two fights in the suburbs, the Momin Khan's troop, finding their way through the breaches in the walls, opened the gates and entered the town. The Kolis commenced plundering, and a hand-to-hand fight ensued, in which the Maráthás were worsted and were eventually expelled from the city. The Kolis attempted to plunder the Dutch factory, but met with a resistance, and when Shambhúrám, a Nágar Bráhman, one of Momín Khán's chief supporters, heard it he ordered the Kolis to cease attacking the factory and consoled the Dutch.

Jawán Mard Khán, who had previously surrendered Ahmedabad to the Marathas and retired, had been invited by the Maráthás to their assistance, set out from Patan, and when he arrived at Pethapur and Mánsa he heard of the capture of Áhmedábád. On reaching Kalol, he was joined by Harbhamrám, governor of Kadi. They resolved to send Zoráwar Khán Bábi to recall Sadáshiv Dámodar, and to await his arrival at Víramgám. Shevakrám, the Gáikwár's deputy, had taken refuge at Dholka. Momín Khán himself now advanced, and entering Áhmedábád on the 17 October 1756, appointed Shambhúrám his deputy. Sadáshiv Dámodar now joined Jawán Mard Khán at Viramgam, and at Jawán Mard Khán's advice it was resolved, before taking further steps, to write to the Peshwa for aid. Jawán Mard Khán, although he held large service estates, charged the Maráthás Rupees 1500 a day for his troops. Jawán Mard Khán and the Maráthás then advanced to Sanand and Jitalpur, and thence marched towards Cambay. On their way they were met, and, after several combats, defeated by a detachment of Momín Khán's army. Momín Khán sent troops to overrun Kadi, but Harbhamrám, the governor of Kadi, defeated the force, and captured their guns. When the emperor heard of the capture of Ghogha, he sent a sword as a present to Momín Khán; and when the news of the capture of Áhmedábád reached Agra, Momín Khán received many compliments. Bálájiráv Peshwa on the other hand was greatly enraged at these reverses. He at once sent off Sadáshiv Rámchandra to Gujarát as his deputy, and Dámáji and Khanderáv Gáikwár also accompanied him with their forces. Momín Khán refusing to give up Áhmedábád, prepared for defense. Sadáshiv Rámchandra, Dámáji and Khanderáv Gáikwár advanced, and, crossing the Mahi River, reached Kaira. Here they were met by Jawán Mard Khán and the rest of the Marátha forces in Gujarát, and the combined army advancing against the capital camped by the Kankaria Lake.

The Maráthás now regularly invested the city, but Momín Khán, aided by Shambhúrám, made a vigorous defence. Up to this time Jawán Mard Khán was receiving Rupees 1500 daily for the pay of his own and his brother's troops. Sadáshiv Rámchandra, considering the number of the troops too small for so large a payment, reduced the amount and retained the men in his own service. After a month's siege, Momín Khán's troops began to clamour for pay, but Shambhúrám, by collecting the sum of Rupees 1 lákh from the inhabitants of the town managed for the time to appease their demands. When they again became urgent for pay, Shambhúrám diverted their thoughts by a general sally from all the gates at night. On this occasion many men were slain on both sides, and many of the inhabitants deserted the town. The copper vessels of such of the townspeople as had fled were melted and coined into money and given to the soldiery. In this state of affairs an order arrived from the imperial court bestowing on Momín Khán a dress of honour and the title of Bahádur. Although the imperial power had for years been merely a name Momín Khán asked and obtained permission from the besiegers to leave the city and meet the bearers of the order. The Maráthás redoubled their efforts. Still though the besiegers were successful in intercepting supplies of grain the garrison fought gallantly in defense of the town.

At this juncture, in 1757, Rája Shivsingh of Ídar, son of the late Anandsingh, who was friendly to Momín Khán, sent Sajánsingh Hazári with a force to assist the besieged. On their way to Áhmedábád, Harbhamrám with a body of Maráthás attacked this detachment, while Momín Khán sent to their aid Muhammad Lál Rohilla and others, and a doubtful battle was fought. Shortly afterwards Sadáshiv Rámchandar made an attempt on the fort of Kálikot. The fort was successfully defended by Jamádár Núr Muhammad, and the Maráthás were repulsed. The Maráthás endeavoured in vain to persuade Shambhúrám to desert Momín Khán, and though the garrison were often endangered by the faithlessness of the Kolis and other causes, they remained staunch. Momín Khán, though frequently in difficulties owing to want of funds to pay his soldiery, continued to defend the town. The Maráthás next tried to seduce some of Momín Khán's officers, but in this they also failed, and in a sally Shambhúrám attacked the camp of Sadáshiv Rámchandar, and burning his tents all but captured the chief himself.

When the siege was at this stage, Hassan Kúli Khán Bahádur, viceroy of Oudh, relinquishing worldly affairs and dividing his property among his nephews, set out to perform a pilgrimage to Mecca. Before he started Shuja-ud-Daula, the Nawáb of Lucknow, requested him on his way to visit Bálájiráv, and endeavour to come to some settlement of Áhmedábád affairs. Accordingly, adopting the name of Sháh Núr, and assuming the dress of an ascetic, Hassan Kúli made his way to Poona, and appearing before the Peshwa offered to make peace at Áhmedábád. Sháh Núr with much difficulty persuaded the Peshwa to allow Momín Khán to retain Cambay and Ghogha without any Marátha share, and to grant him a lákh of rupees for the payment of his troops, on condition that he should surrender Áhmedábád. He obtained letters from the Peshwa addressed to Sadáshiv Rámchandra to this effect, and set out with them for Áhmedábád. When he arrived Sadáshiv Rámchandra was unwilling to accede to the terms, as the Áhmedábád garrison were reduced to great straits. Sháh Núr persuaded him at last to agree, provided Momín Khán would surrender without delay. Accordingly, Sháh Núr entered the city and endeavoured to persuade Momín Khán. Momín Khán demanded in addition a few Petlád villages, and to this the Maráthás refused their consent. Sháh Núr left in disgust. Before many days Momín Khán was forced to make overtures for peace. After discussions with Dámáji Gáikwár, it was agreed that Momín Khán should surrender the city, receive Rupees 1 lákh to pay his soldiery, and be allowed to retain Cambay as heretofore, that is to say that the Peshwa should, as formerly, enjoy half the revenues. In addition to this Momín Khán had to promise to pay the Maráthás a yearly tribute of Rupees 10,000 and to give up all claims on the town of Ghogha and hand over Shambhúrám to the Maráthás. It was also arranged that the Rupees 35,000 worth of ashrafis which he had taken through Jamádár Sálim should be deducted from the Rupees 1 lákh. Momín Khán surrendered the town on 27 February 1758.

Sadáshiv Rámchandar and Dámáji Gáikwár entered the city and undertook its management on behalf of the Maráthás. Of the other chiefs who were engaged in prosecuting the siege, Sadáshiv Dámodar returned to the Dakhan (Deccan) and Jawán Mard Khán receiving some presents from Sadáshiv Rámchandar departed for Pátan after having had a meeting with Dámáji Gáikwár at a village a few miles from the capital. Shambhurám, the Nágar Bráhman, who had so zealously supported Momín Khán, when he saw that further assistance was useless, tried to escape, but was taken prisoner and sent in chains to Baroda. Sadáshiv Rámchandar, on taking charge of the city, had interviews with the principal officials, among whom was the author of the Mirăt-i-Áhmedi, and, receiving them graciously, confirmed most of them in their offices. Then, after choosing Náro Pandit, brother of Pándurang Pandit, to be his deputy in Áhmedábád, he started on an expedition to collect tribute in Jhalawad and Sorath. On receiving the government of the city the Marátha generals ordered new coin bearing the mark of an elephant goad to be struck in the Áhmedábád mint. Sayájiráv Gáikwár remained in Áhmedábád on behalf of his father Dámáji, and shortly afterwards went towards Kapadvanj to collect tribute. Thence at his father's request he proceeded to Sorath to arrange for the payment of the Gáikwár's share of the revenues of that district. On his return to Cambay, Momín Khán was much harassed by his troops for arrears of pay. The timely arrival of his steward Varajlál with the Peshwa's contribution of Rupees 1 lákh enabled him to satisfy their demands.

Momín Khán now began to oppress and extort money from his own followers, and is said to have instigated the murder of his steward Varajlál. Sadáshiv Rámchandar went from Porbandar to Junagadh, where he was joined by Sayájiráv Gáikwár. At Junágaḍh, Sher Khán Bábi presented Sadáshiv Rámchandra and Siyájiráv with horses and they spoke of the necessity of admitting a Marátha deputy into Junágaḍh. Nothing was settled as the Maráthás were forced to return to Áhmedábád. In accordance with orders from the Peshwa, Shambhurám and his sons, who were still in confinement, were sent to Poona. Dámáji Gáikwár was also summoned to Poona, but he did not go.

Expedition from Kutch against Sindh, 1758

In this year Ráo Lakhpatji of Kutch presented Kutchi horses and Gujarát bullocks to the emperor Alamgir II, and in return received the title of Mírza Rája. About this time the Ráo of Kutch, who planned an expedition against Sindh, solicited aid both from Dámáji Gáikwár and Sadáshiv Rámchandar to enable him to conquer Thatta, and, as he agreed to pay expenses, Sadáshiv sent Ranchordás, and Dámáji sent Shevakrám to help him.

In this year also Neknám Khán, governor of Bharuch, received the title of Bahádur and other honours. In 1758, Sadáshiv Rámchandar advanced to Kaira and after settling accounts with Dámáji's agent proceeded against Cambay. Momín Khán, who was about to visit the Peshwa at Poona, remained to defend the town, but was forced to pay arrears of tribute amounting to £2000 (Rs. 20,000). In this year Sher Khán Bábi died at Junágaḍh, and the nobles of his court seated his son Muhammad Mahábat Khán in his place.

Shortly after at the invitation of the Peshwa, Dámáji Gáikwár went to Poona, and sent his son Sayájiráv into Sorath. After his success at Cambay Sadáshiv Rámchandra levied tribute from the chiefs of Umeta, and then returned. On his way back, on account of the opposition caused by Sardár Muhammad Khán son of Sher Khán Bábi, the chief of Balasinor, Sadáshiv Rámchandar besieged Bálásinor and forced the chief to pay Rupees 30,000. Next marching against Lunavada, he compelled the chief Dípsingh to pay £5000 (Rs. 50,000). Sadáshiv then went to Visnagar and so to Palanpur, where Muhammad Khán Bahádur Jhálori resisted him; but after a month's siege he agreed to pay a tribute of Rupees 35,000. Passing south from Pálanpur, Sadáshiv went to Unjha-Unáva, and from that to Katosan where he levied Rupees 10,000 from the chief Shuja, and then proceeded to Limbdi.

=== Surat Affairs, 1758 ===
In the early part of 1758, Sayad Muîn-ud-dín, otherwise called Sayad Achchan, visited the Peshwa at Poona, and received from him the appointment of governor of Surat. Sayad Achchan then set out for his charge, and as he was aided by a body of Marátha troops under the command of Muzaffar Khán Gárdi and had also secured the support of Neknám Khán, the governor of Bharuch, he succeeded after some resistance in expelling Áli Nawáz Khán, son of the late Safdar Muhammad Khán, and establishing himself in the government. During the recent troubles, the English factory had been plundered and two of their clerks murdered by Ahmed Khán Habshi, commandant of the fort.

The English take command of Surat, 1759.

The English therefore determined to drive out the Habshi and themselves assume the government of the Surat Castle. With this object men-of-war were despatched from Bombay to the help of Mr. Spencer, the chief of the English factory, and the castle was taken in March 1759, and Mr. Spencer appointed governor. The Peshwa appears to have consented to this conquest. The Marátha troops aided and made a demonstration without the city, and a Marátha man-of-war which had been stationed at Bassein (Vasai), came to assist the English. A Mr. Glass appears to have been appointed kiledár under Governor Spencer.

Shortly afterwards Momín Khán, by the advice of Sayad Husain, an agent of the Peshwa, contracted friendship with the English through Mr. Erskine, the chief of the English factory at Cambay. Momín Khán then asked Mr. Erskine to obtain permission for him to go to Poona by Bombay. Leave being granted, Momín Khán set out for Surat, and was there received by Mr. Spencer. From Surat he sailed for Bombay, where the governor, Mr. Bourchier, informed the Peshwa of his arrival. The Peshwa sending permission for his further advance to Poona, Momín Khán took leave of Mr. Bourchier and proceeded to Poona.

== Maratha viceroys ==
=== Sadáshiv Rámchandra, Peshwa’s Viceroy, 1760 ===
The Maráthás in Kathiawad, 1759

From Limbḍi, to which point his tribute tour has been traced, Sadáshiv Rámchandra advanced against Dhrangadhra, when the chief who was at Halvad sent an army against him. The Maráthás, informed of the chief's design, detaching a force, attacked Halvad at night, and breaching the walls forced open the gates. The chief retired to his palace, which was fortified, and there defended himself, but was at last forced to surrender, and was detained a prisoner until he should pay a sum of Rupees 1,20,000. The neighbouring chiefs, impressed with the fate of Halvad, paid tribute without opposition. Sadáshiv Rámchandra now went to Junágaḍh, but ere he could commence operations against the fortress, the rainy season drew near, and returning to Áhmedábád he prepared to depart for Poona. Sayáji Gáikwár, who was also in Sorath collecting tribute, amongst other places besieged Kundla, and levying from that town a tribute of Rupees 75,000 returned to the capital. During this time Khanderáv Gáikwár had been levying tribute from the Kolis, and after visiting the Bhíl district went to Vijapur, Idar, Kadi, Dholka, and Nadiad. The chief of Halvad on paying his Rupees 1,20,000 was allowed to depart, and Dípsingh of Lunáváḍa, who was also a prisoner, was sent to Lunáváḍa and there released after paying his tribute.

On receiving the news of the capture of the Surat fort by the English the emperor Alamgir II issued an order, in the name of the governor of Bombay, confirming the command of the fort to the English instead of to the Habshis of Janjira, appointing the East India Company admirals of the imperial fleet, and at the same time discontinuing the yearly payment of Rupees 20,000 formerly made to the Habshi on this account. When in 1760, this imperial order reached Surat, Mr. Spencer and other chief men of the city went outside of the walls to meet and escort the bearers of the despatch.

Sadáshiv Rámchandra was appointed viceroy of Áhmedábád on behalf of the Peshwa. Bhagvantráv now conquered Bálásinor from Sardár Muhammad Khán Bábi, and then marching to Sorath, collected the Peshwa's share of the tribute of that province, according to the scale of the previous year. Sayáji Gáikwár, when Bhagvantráv had returned, set out to Sorath to levy the Gáikwár's share of the tribute. He was accompanied by Harbhamrám whom Dámáji Gáikwár had specially sent from his own court to act as Kámdár to Sayáji. When Sadáshiv Rámchandra reported to the Peshwa the conquest of Bálásinor by Bhagvantráv he was highly pleased, and gave Bhagvantráv a dress of honour and allowed him to keep the elephant which he had captured at Lunáváḍa; and passed a patent bestowing Bálásinor upon him. Momín Khán, after making firm promises to the Peshwa never to depart from the terms of the treaty he had made with the Maráthás, left Poona and came to Bombay, where he was courteously entertained by the Governor, and despatched by boat to Surat. From Surat he passed to Cambay by land through Broach. Sayáji Gáikwár had returned to Áhmedábád from Sorath in bad health, and his uncle Khanderáv Gáikwár, who had been vainly endeavouring to subdue the Kolis of Lúhára, came to Áhmedábád and took Sayáji Gáikwár to Naḍiád.

=== Ápa Ganesh, Viceroy, 1761 ===
In 1761, Sadáshiv Rámchandra was displaced as viceroy of Gujarát by Ápa Ganesh. This officer acted in a friendly manner to Momín Khán, and marching to Cambay, he fixed the Marátha share of the revenues of that place for that year at Rupees 84,000, and then went to Áhmedábád by way of Dakor. Narbherám collected this year the Gáikwár's share of the tribute of Sorath and Sayáji Gáikwár went to Baroda. On his return to Áhmedábád at the end of the year, Sayáji sacked and burned the Koli village of Lúhára in Bahyal about eighteen miles east of Áhmedábád. Jawán Mard Khán now issued from Pátan and levied small contributions from the holdings in Vagad, as far as Anjar in Kutch. From Vágad he proceeded to Sorath, and in concert with Muhammad Mahábat Khán of Junágaḍh and Muhammad Muzáffar Khán Bábi, between whom he made peace, he levied tribute in Sorath as far as Loliyana, and returned to Pátan.

1761

The Marathas were defeated by Afghan forces in the Third Battle of Panipat (1761). Taking advantage of the confusion that followed, the Delhi court despatched instructions to the chief Mughal nobles of Gujarát, directing Momín Khán, Jawán Mard Khán, and the governor of Bharuch to join in driving the Maráthás out of the province. In consequence of this despatch, Sardár Muhammad Khán Bábi, defeating the Marátha garrison, regained Bálásinor, while the governor of Bharuch, with the aid of Momín Khán, succeeded in winning back Jambúsar. Ápa Ganesh, the Peshwa's viceroy, remonstrated with Momín Khán for this breach of faith. In reply his envoy was shown the despatch received from Delhi, and was made the bearer of a message, that before it was too late, it would be wisdom for the Maráthás to abandon Gujarát. Things were in this state when Dámáji Gáikwár, wisely forgetting his quarrels with the Peshwa, marched to the aid of Sadáshiv with a large army. Advancing against Cambay he attacked and defeated Momín Khán, plundering one of his villages. But the Maráthás were too weak to follow up this success, or exact severer punishment from the Mughal confederates. Ápa Ganesh invited Sardár Muhammad Khán Bábi to Kaira, and on condition of the payment of tribute, agreed to allow him to keep possession of Bálásinor. Subsequently, Dámáji's energy enabled him to enlarge the power and possessions of the Gáikwár's house, besides acquisitions from other chiefs, recovering the districts of Visnagar, Kheralu, Vadnagar, Vijápur, and Pátan from Jawán Mard Khán.

Thus the Marathas completely took over Gujarat and Mughal rule ended.
