= Manaji Rao Gaekwad =

Maharaja of Baroda from 1789 to 1793

- Sena Khas Khel

5th Maharaja of Baroda
- Reign: 26 December 1789 – 1 August 1793
- Predecessor: Fateh Singh Rao Gaekwad
- Successor: Govind Rao Gaekwad
- Born: c. 1751
- Died: 1 August 1793 (aged 41–42)
- House: Gaekwad
- Father: Damaji Rao Gaekwad

Manaji Rao Gaekwad (c. 1751 – 1 August 1793) was the fifth Maharaja of Baroda State from 1789 to 1793.

He was the fifth son of Damaji Rao Gaekwad. Before becoming Maharaja, he also served as a regent for Baroda State from 1779 to 1792 under Sayaji Rao I Gaekwad. After his death he was succeeded as Maharaja of Baroda by Govind Rao Gaekwad.

== See also ==
- Gaekwad dynasty
