= Khanderao II Gaekwad =

Maharaja of Baroda from 1856 to 1870

- Sena Khas Khel Shamsher Bahadur
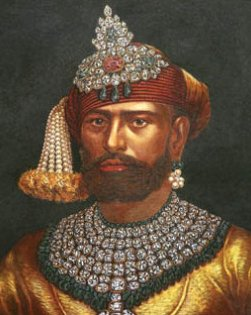

Maharaja of Baroda
- Reign: 19 November 1856 - 28 November 1870
- Predecessor: Ganpat Rao Gaekwad
- Successor: Malhar Rao Gaekwad
- Born: 1828
- Died: 28 November 1870 (aged 41–42); Makarpura Palace
- Father: Sayaji Rao Gaekwad II

Shrimant Maharaja Sir Khanderao II Gaekwad, Sena Khas Khel Shamsher Bahadur (Note: Sena Khas Khel Shamsher Bahadur was a title used by Gaekwad rulers, which literally mean Leader of Army (Sena Khas Khel), Master of Sword and the Brave (Shamsher Bahadur)), GCSI (1828–1870) was the Maharaja of Baroda State from 1856 to 1870.

== Early life ==
He was born in 1828.

== Reign ==
He was the third son of Maharaja Sayaji Rao Gaekwad II. He succeeded to the throne on the death of his eldest brother and the king Ganpat Rao Gaekwad on 19 November 1856 and reigned till his death on 28 November 1870. He was knighted as GCSI in 1861.

He commissioned the Pearl Carpet of Baroda, which he intended to donate to Prophet Muhammad's Tomb in Medina, however he died before the donation could take place.

He died suddenly in 1870 and was succeeded by his brother Malharrao Gaekwad but Malharrao was later deposed by British and widow of Kanderao II, Maharani Jamnabai Sahib Gaekwad, later adopted a boy from the related family, who became the next ruler of Baroda State - Sayajirao Gaekwad III.

During his reign, the Baroda State started the narrow gauge railway, known as Gaekwar's Baroda State Railway. It was started in the year 1862.

== Religious views ==
Although a Hindu himself, the Maharaja supposedly had an admiration of Islam, and that was the reason for his desire to gift the pearl carpet to Prophet Muhammad's tomb.
