= Malhar Rao Gaekwad =

Maharaja of Baroda from 1870 to 1875

- Maharaja of Baroda
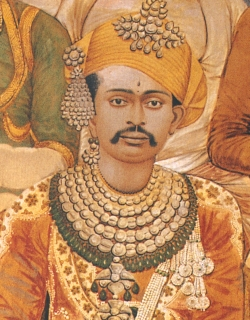
- Malhar Rao Gaekwad

11th Maharaja of Baroda
- Reign: 28 November 1870 – 10 April 1875
- Predecessor: Khanderao II Gaekwad
- Successor: Sayajirao Gaekwad III; Madhav Rao Thanjavurkar (de facto)
- Born: c. 1831
- Died: 1882 (aged 50–51)
- Wives: Mhalsa Bai; Lakshmi Bai
- Issue: Vyankatrao; Jayasinhrao
- House: Gaekwad
- Father: Sayaji Rao Gaekwad II
- Religion: Hinduism

Malhar Rao Gaekwad was the eleventh Maharaja of Baroda State reigning from 1870 to 1875, when he was dethroned.

== Early life and family ==
Malhar Rao Gaekwad was born in 1831 to Sayajirao Gaekwad II. He was married twice: first to Mhalsa Bai and then to Lakshmi Bai. From these marriages, he had two sons, Vyankatrao and Jayasinhrao.

== Succession ==
He became Maharaja of Baroda after the death of his elder brother, Khanderao II Gaekwad.

== Reign ==
Malhar Rao regularly spent money on prostitutes, nearly emptying the Baroda State's coffers (he commissioned a pair of solid gold cannons and a carpet of pearls, among other expenses) and reports soon reached the Resident of Malhar Rao's gross tyranny and cruelty. Malhar Rao further attempted to cover up his deeds by poisoning the British Resident at Baroda, Robert Phayre, brother of Lieutenant General Arthur Purves Phayre with a compound of arsenic allegedly, as the case was only proven by the British and the Imperial government of India. By order of the Secretary of State for India, Lord Salisbury, Malhar Rao was deposed on 10 April 1875 and exiled to Madras, where he died in obscurity in 1882.
