= Pilaji Rao Gaekwad =

Maharaja of Baroda from 1721 to 1732

- Sena Khas Khel
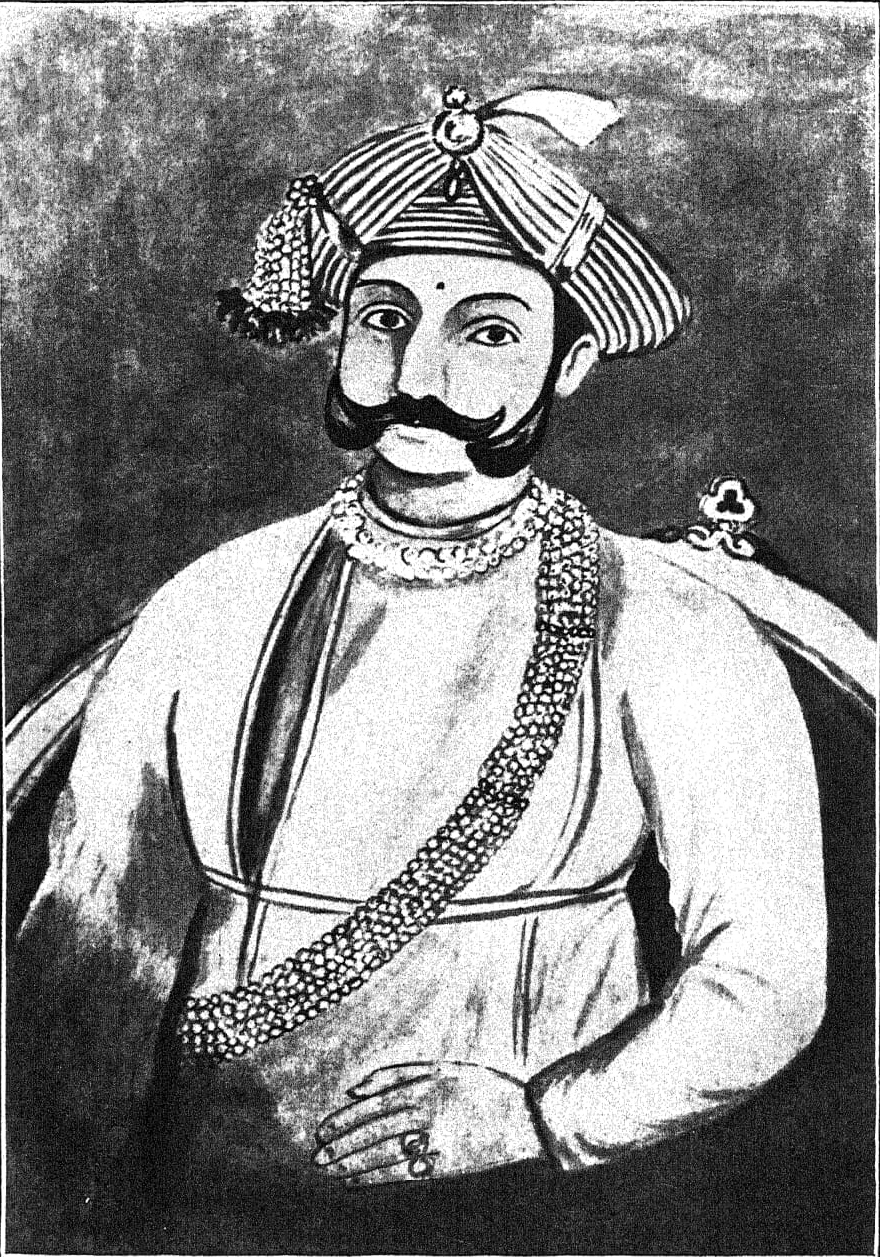
- 20th century print of Pilaji Rao

1st Maharaja of Baroda
- Reign: 1721 – 14 May 1732
- Predecessor: Position established
- Successor: Damaji Rao Gaekwad
- Died: 14 May 1732; Dakor, Baroda State, Maratha Confederacy
- Issue: Damaji Rao II
- House: Gaekwad
- Father: Jhingoji Rao Gaekwad (parental); Damaji I Gaekwad (adopted)
- Religion: Hinduism

Pilajirao Gaekwad (died 14 May 1732) was a Maratha general. He is considered to be the founder of the Gaekwad dynasty of the Maratha Empire, who became the Maharaja of Baroda.

== Early life ==
Pilaji was the eldest son of Jhingojirao Kerojirao Gaekwad. He was adopted by his uncle Damaji I Gaekwad (died 1721), who had been given the hereditary title of Shamsher Bahadur by Chhattrapati Shahu for bravery in a battle.

== For Dabhade service ==
The Gaekwads were originally lieutenants of the Dabhade family, the Maratha chiefs of Gujarat and holders of the senapati (commander-in-chief) title. Pilaji was a mutalik (deputy) of Trimbak Rao Dabhade. When Trimbak Rao was killed for rebelling against the Maratha Peshwa in 1731, his minor son Yashwant Rao Dabhade was appointed as the senapati. The Peshwa allowed the Dabhades to retain their territories in Gujarat, on the condition that they would remit half of their revenues to the Maratha Chhatrapati's treasury. Pilaji continued to serve Yashwant Rao and was granted the title Sena Khas Khel by the Peshwa in addition to Shamsher Bahadur. Since Yashwant Rao was a minor, Pilaji was responsible for collecting the revenues from Gujarat.

== Legacy ==
Pilaji was assassinated on 14 May 1732 in Dakor by emissaries of Maharaja Abhai Singh of Marwar. He was cremated in Savli village, which lies on the Baroda-Dakor road. He was succeeded by his son Damaji Rao Gaekwad (also known as Damaji II). Damaji fought against Peshwa Balaji Baji Rao when the Dabhades rebelled against the Peshwa. He was defeated and arrested, but later, the Peshwa appointed him as the Maratha chief of Gujarat, replacing the Dabhades. Pilaji's descendants thus ruled Gujarat in form of the Gaekwad dynasty.
