= Kirti Mandir, Vadodara =

Coordinates: 22.3075°N 73.1911°E

Kirti Mandir
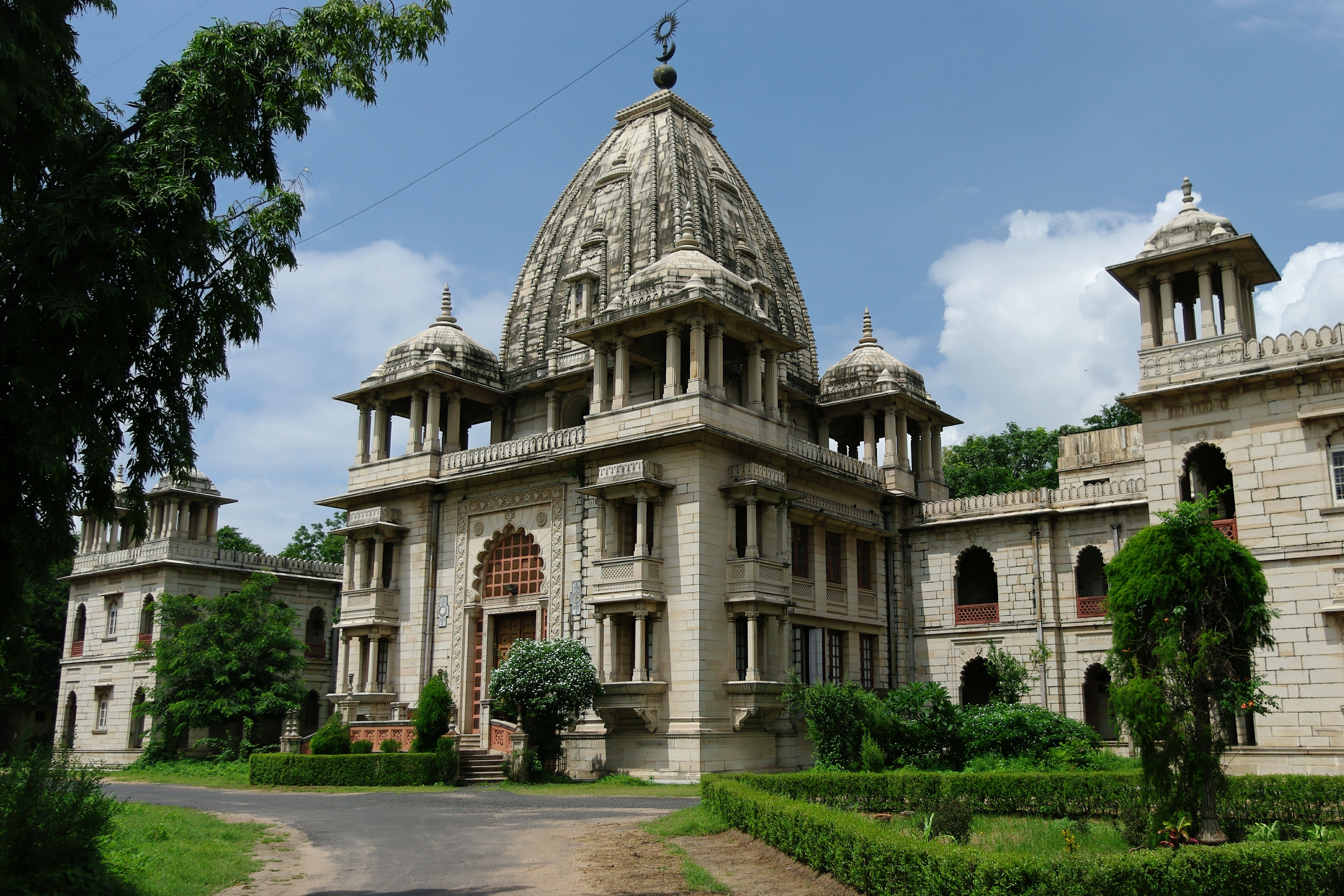
- Interactive map of the Kirti Mandir area

General information
- Type: centotaph
- Location: Vadodara, Gujarat
- Completed: 1936

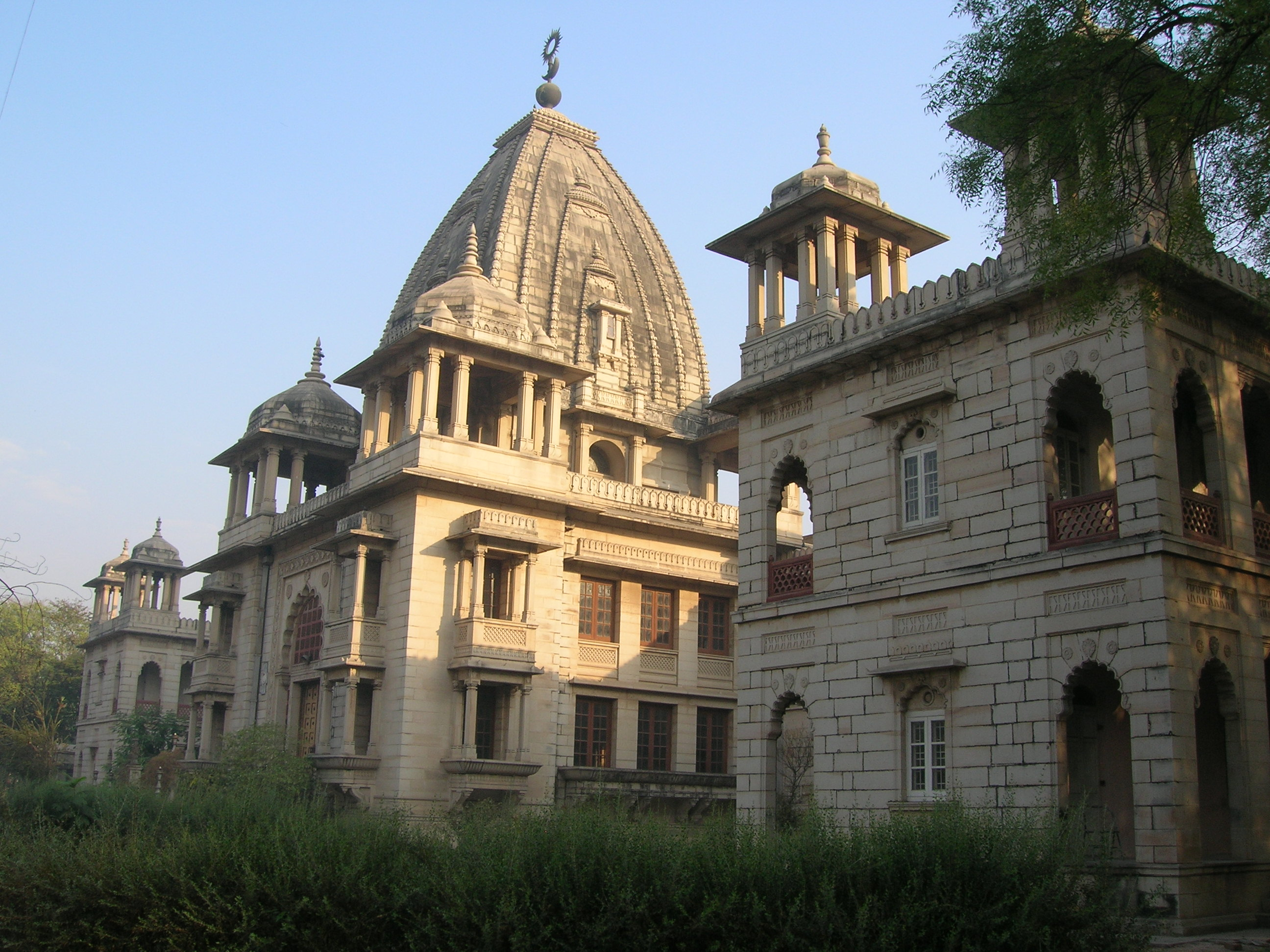
Kirti Mandir

Kirti Mandir (Gujarati: કિર્તિ મંદિર), (lit. 'Temple of Fame'), is the cenotaph of the Gaekwads, located in the city of Vadodara.

== History ==
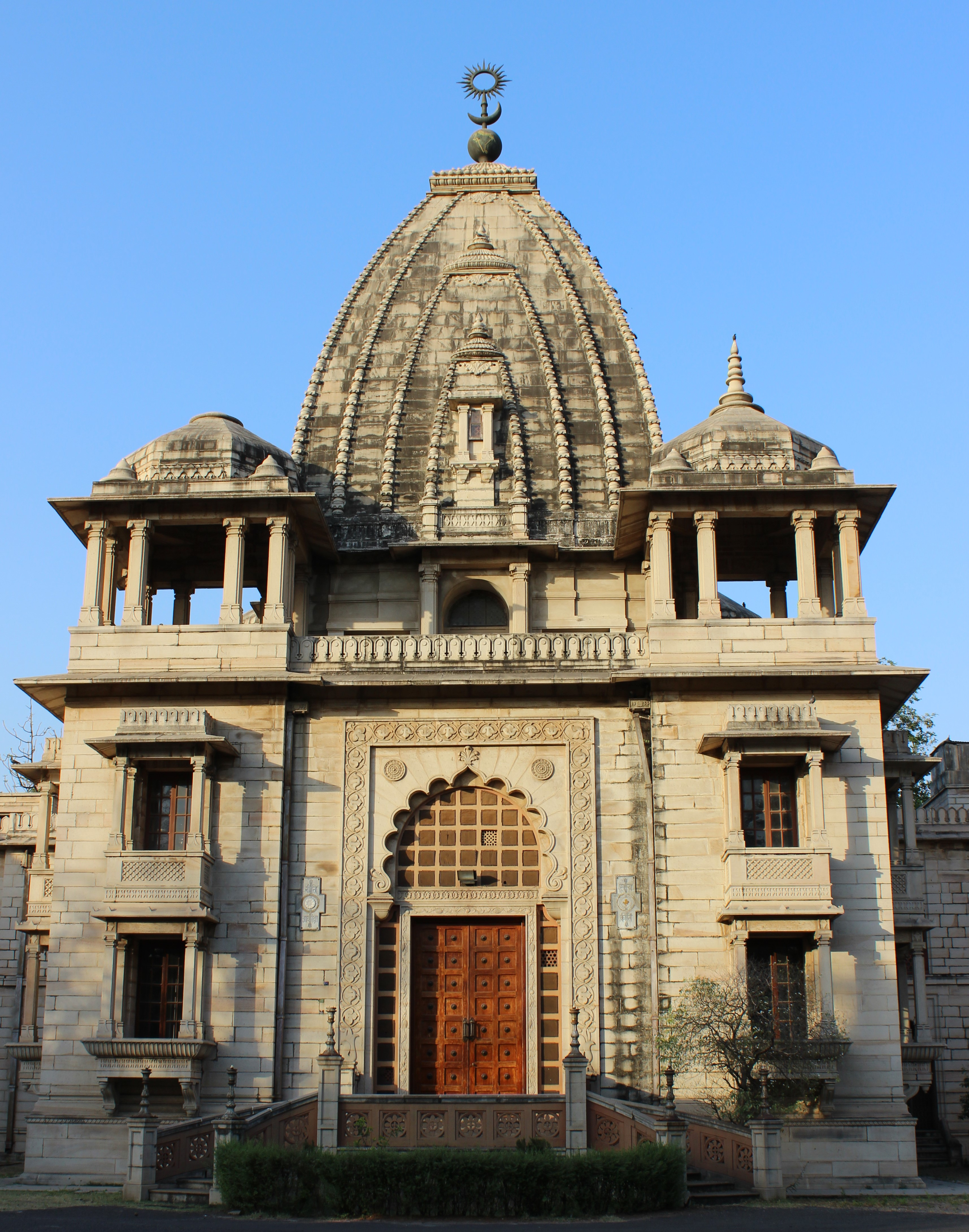
Kirti Mandir Front View

Kirti Mandir was built by Maharaja Sayajirao Gaekwad III of the Gaekwad dynasty of the Marathas to perpetuate the glorious memory of his beloved ancestors. The sun, the moon and the earth in bronze with the undivided map of India adorn the shikhara of Kirti Mandir. It was built in 1936 as part of the Diamond Jubilee celebrations of Maharaja Sayajirao Gaekwad III. The temple houses five wall paintings by artist Nandalal Bose showing various phases of the Battle of the Mahabharata, and some episodes from Indian mythology. The city of Vadodara, also popularly known as Baroda, used to be the seat of the Gaekwad or Gaikwad monarchs. It was formerly called by many names. The city was referred to as Chandravati, then Viravati, and Vadpatra due to the great quantity of banyan trees on the banks of the Vishwamitri River. Kirti Mandir is situated in the city of Vadodara. It is a collection of temples built by Sayajirao Maharajah near the Vishwamitra Bridge of the city.

It is believed that Sayajirao Maharaja built Kirti Mandir in memory of the deceased members of the royal Gaekwad family and the edifice is dedicated to Lord Mahadev. Today it is a major tourist attraction in the city.

== Architecture ==
The outstanding stone building is constructed in the shape of a letter "E" with terraces, balconies, domes and a central shikhara that rises to approximately 35 metres. The interiors of Kirti Mandir are marble-finished and brilliantly decorated with intricately carved murals. The walls of the central hall are adorned with many impressive murals such as the Gangavataran, Life of Meera, battle of Mahabharat and Natir Poojan which are all very well preserved works from the renowned Bengali artist Nandalal Bose. Statues as well as precious photographs of eminent members of the Gaekwad family are also displayed for public viewing. According to annals of history, the golden era in the Maratha rule of Baroda commenced when Sayajirao Maharaja came to power in 1875. The Kirti Mandir of Baroda was built at a cost of Rs. 50,000, it preserves in its various rooms the statues and photographs of the members of the royal family. The interior of this elegant structure is marble finished and on the walls of the central hall are the murals Gangavataran, battle of Mahabharat, Life of Meera and Natir Pooja-executed by the famous Bengali artist Nandalal Bose. . The Kirti Mandir in Vadodara is actually a cluster of temples dedicated to Lord Shiva. The temples were constructed by His Highness Maharaj Sayajirao Gaekwad in 1936, on the occasion of the Diamond Jubilee celebrations. Also known as the Temple of Fame, it is situated near the picturesque Vishwamitra Bridge of the city, in the memory of deceased members of the royal Gaekwad family. The marble treated interiors of the Kirti Mandir is wonderfully decorated with intricately carved murals. The characteristic ‘shikhara’ of this statuesque monument represents the sun, the moon and the earth in bronze with the undivided map of India.
