= Anand Rao Gaekwad =

Maharaja of Baroda from 1800 to 1819

- Sena Khas Khel
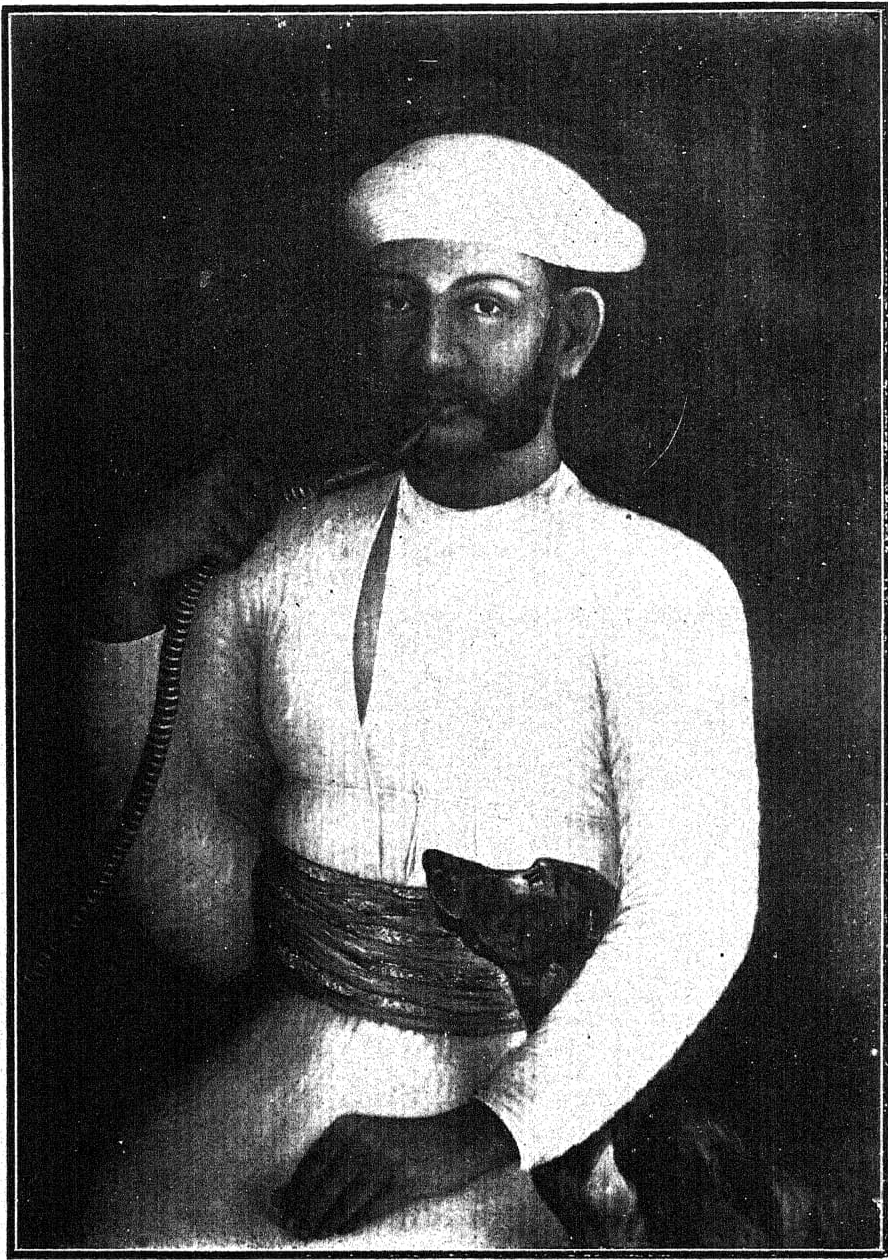

7th Maharaja of Baroda
- Reign: 19 September 1800 – 1819
- Predecessor: Govind Rao Gaekwad
- Successor: Sayaji Rao Gaekwad II
- Died: 1819
- House: Gaekwad
- Father: Govind Rao Gaekwad
- Religion: Hinduism

Anand Rao Gaekwad was the seventh Maharaja of Baroda State from 1800 to 1819 with the regents of Fateh Singh II and Sayaji Rao Gaekwad. He became Maharaja of Baroda after the death of Govind Rao Gaekwad.

== Death ==
He died in 1819 and was succeeded by Sayaji Rao II Gaekwad as the new ruler of Baroda.

== See also ==
- Gaekwad dynasty
