= Maguna =

Village in Gujarat, India

Coordinates: 23°34′36″N 72°17′19″E

Maguna is a town in the Mehsana district of Gujarat in western India.

== History ==
Maguna was a Seventh Class taluka and princely state, also comprising four more villages, part of the Katosan thana, in Mahi Kantha.

It had a combined population of 3,235 in 1901, yielding a state revenue of 11,959 Rupees (1903–4, nearly all from land) and paying a tribute of 892 Rupees, to the Gaekwar Baroda State.

== Sources and external links ==
- Imperial Gazetteer, on dsal.uchicago.edu - Mahi Kantha
