= Govind Rao Gaekwad =

Maharaja of Baroda from 1793 to 1800

Maharaja of Baroda
- Reign: 1 August 1793 – 19 September 1800
- Predecessor: Manaji Rao Gaekwad
- Successor: Anand Rao Gaekwad
- Died: 19 September 1800
- Spouse: Gahenabai
- Issue: Anand Rao Gaekwad
- House: Gaekwad
- Father: Damaji Rao Gaekwad
- Religion: Hindu

Govind Rao Gaekwad (died 19 September 1800) was the Maharaja of Baroda State from 1793 until his death in 1800. He was the fourth son of Damaji Rao Gaekwad.

== See also ==
- Gaekwad dynasty
