= Gaekwad dynasty =

Hindu Maratha dynasty (1721–1947)

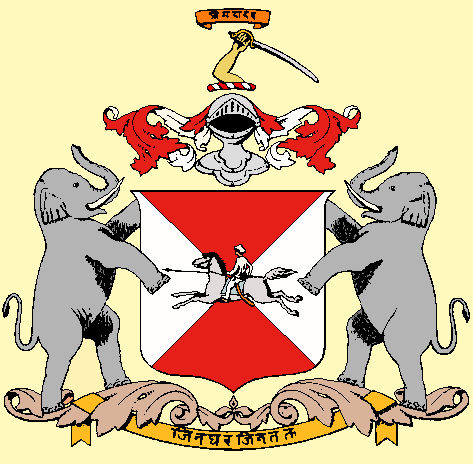

- Flag (1936–1949)
- Country: Baroda State
- Origin: Maharashtra, India
- Founded: 1721
- Founder: Pilaji Rao Gaekwad
- Current head: Samarjitsinh Gaekwad
- Final ruler: Pratap Singh Rao Gaekwad (Baroda); Fatehsinghrao Gaekwad (Rajpramukh)
- Titles: Raja of Baroda; Rajpramukh of Baroda
- Deposition: 1949
- Website: https://gaekwadsofbaroda.in/

Gaekwads (also spelled as Gaikwads, Gaekwars) (IAST: Gāyakavāḍa), was a Hindu Maratha dynasty of the former Maratha Empire founded by Chatrapati Shivaji Raje Bhonsle. Its subsequent (erstwhile) princely state of Baroda in western India from the early 18th century until 1947. The ruling prince was known as the Maharaja Gaekwad of Baroda. With the city of Baroda (Vadodara) as its capital, during the British Raj its relations with the British were managed by the Baroda Residency. It was one of the largest and wealthiest princely states of British India, with its wealth coming from the lucrative cotton business as well as rice, wheat and sugar production.

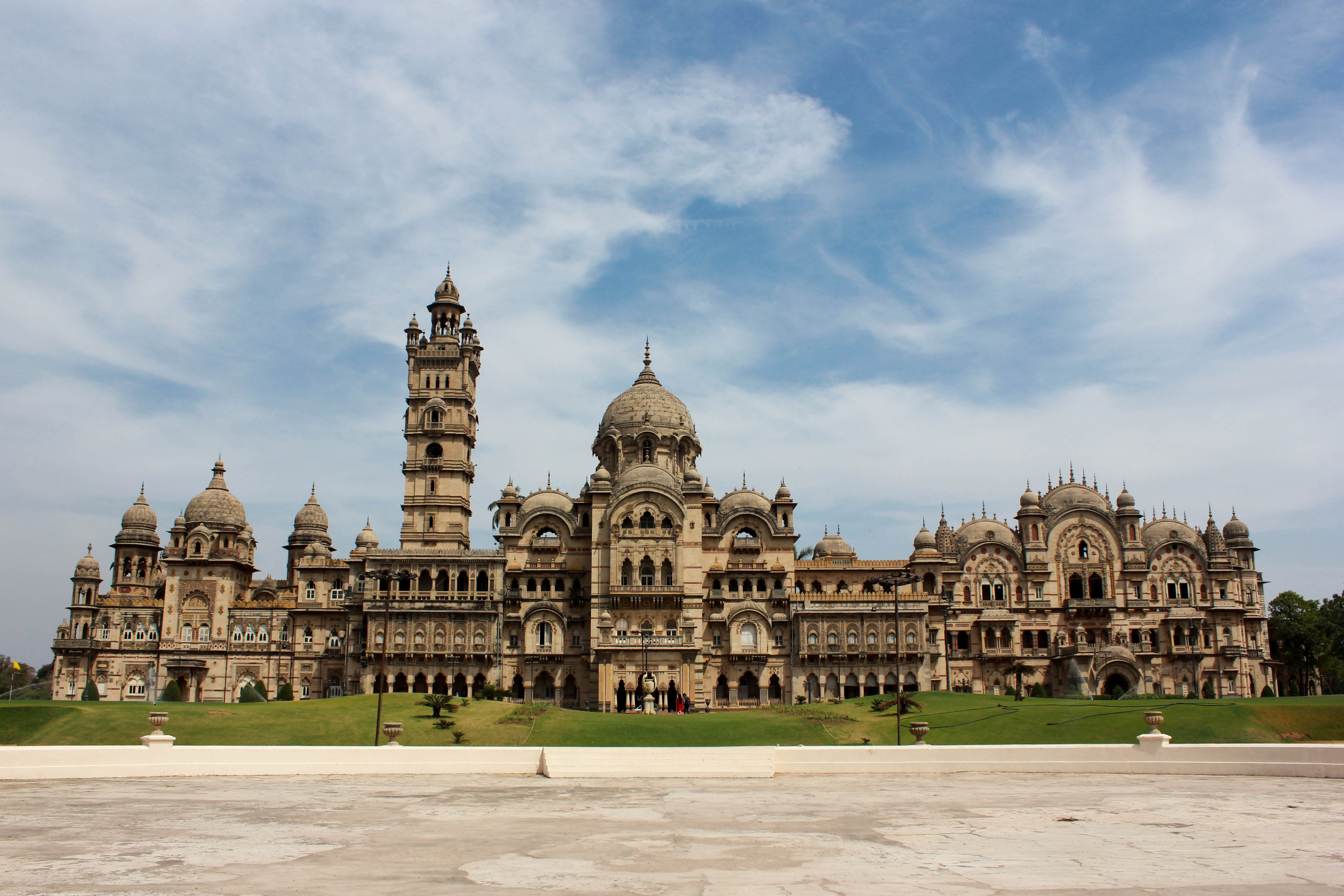
Laxmi Vilas Palace of the Gaekwad dynasty.

== Early history ==
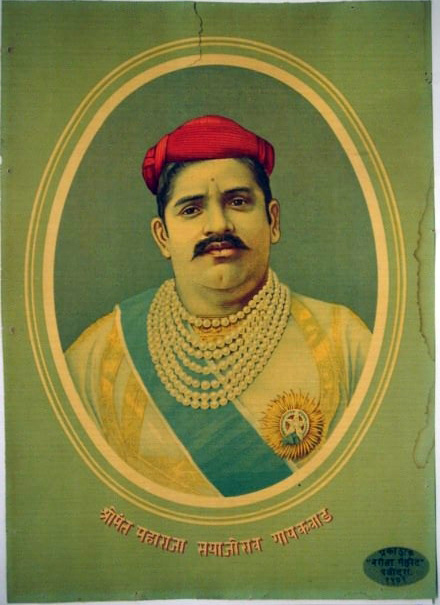
A print of Maharaja Sayajirao Gaikwad

The Gaekwad rule of Baroda began when the Maratha general Pilaji Rao Gaekwad conquered the city from the Mughal Empire in 1721. The Gaekwads were granted the city as a Jagir by Chhatrapati Shahu I, the emperor of the Maratha Empire and Peshwa Bajirao I played an important role in helping Pilaji Rao Gaekwad strengthen his position in Baroda and establish his rule there.

In their early years, the Gaekwads served as subordinates of the Dabhade family, who were the Maratha chiefs of Gujarat and holders of the senapati (commander-in-chief) title. When Umabai Dabhade joined Tarabai's side against Balaji Baji Rao, Pilaji's son Damaji Rao Gaekwad commanded the Dabhade force. He was defeated, and remained in Peshwa's custody from May 1751 to March 1752. In 1752, he was released after agreeing to abandon the Dabhades and accept the Peshwa's suzerainty. In return, Damaji was made the Maratha chief of Gujarat, and the Peshwa helped him expel the Mughals from Gujarat.

Damaji subsequently fought alongside Sadashiv Rao, Vishwas Rao, Malhar Rao Holkar, Jankoji Scindia, Sidhoji Gharge-Desai (Deshmukh) and Mahadji Shinde in the Third Battle of Panipat (1761). After the Maratha defeat at Panipat, the central rule of the Peshwas was weakened. As a result, the Gaekwads, along with several other powerful Maratha clans, established themselves as virtually independent rulers, while recognizing the nominal authority of the Peshwas and suzerainty of the Bhonsle Maharaja of Satara.

== British suzerainty ==
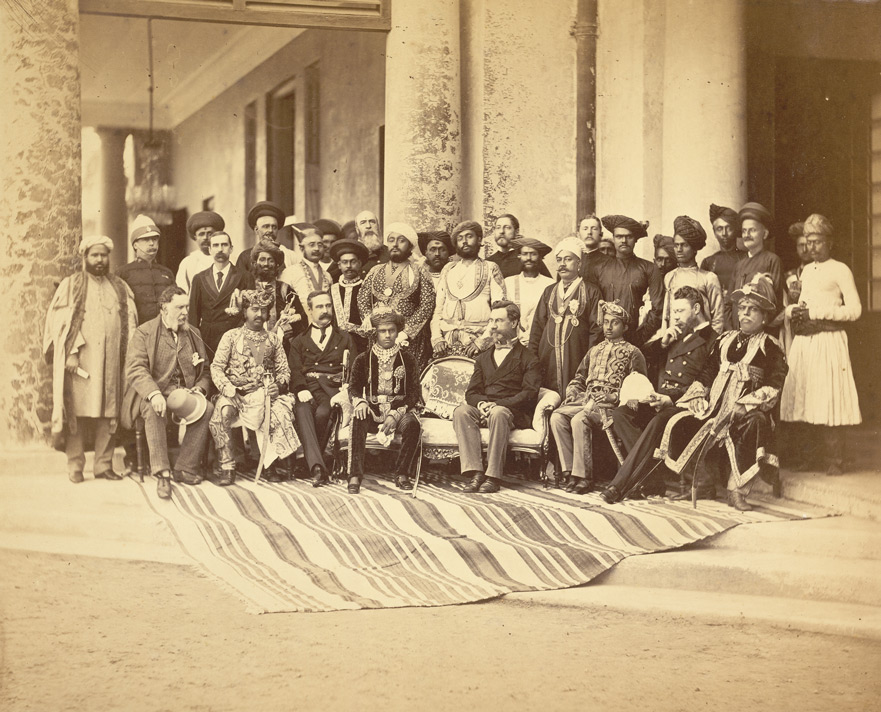
Sayajirao with Richard Temple, the Governor of Bombay and other members of the court. Circa 1880

The Gaekwads, together with several Maratha chieftains, fought the British in the First Anglo-Maratha War.

On 15 March 1802, the British intervened to defend the Gaekwad Maharaja, Anand Rao Gaekwad, who had recently inherited the throne against rival claimants, and the Gaekwads concluded the Treaty of Cambey with the British that recognized their independence from the Maratha Confederacy and guaranteed the Maharajas of Baroda local autonomy in return for recognizing British suzerainty, though it was a result of an inability to overpower them.

Maharaja Sayaji Rao III, who took the throne in 1875, did much to modernize Baroda, establishing compulsory primary education, a library system and the Maharaja Sayajirao University of Baroda. He also encouraged the setting up of textile factories, which helped create Baroda's textile industry. He is known for offering B. R. Ambedkar a scholarship to study at Columbia University.

Upon India attaining its independence in 1947, the last ruling Maharaja of Baroda, Pratapsinhrao, acceded to India. Baroda was eventually merged with Bombay State, which was later divided, based on linguistic principle, into the states of Gujarat and Maharashtra in 1960.

Gaekwad or Gayakwad also survives as a fairly common Maratha surname, found mainly in the Indian state of Maharashtra.

== Gaikwad Maharajas of Baroda ==
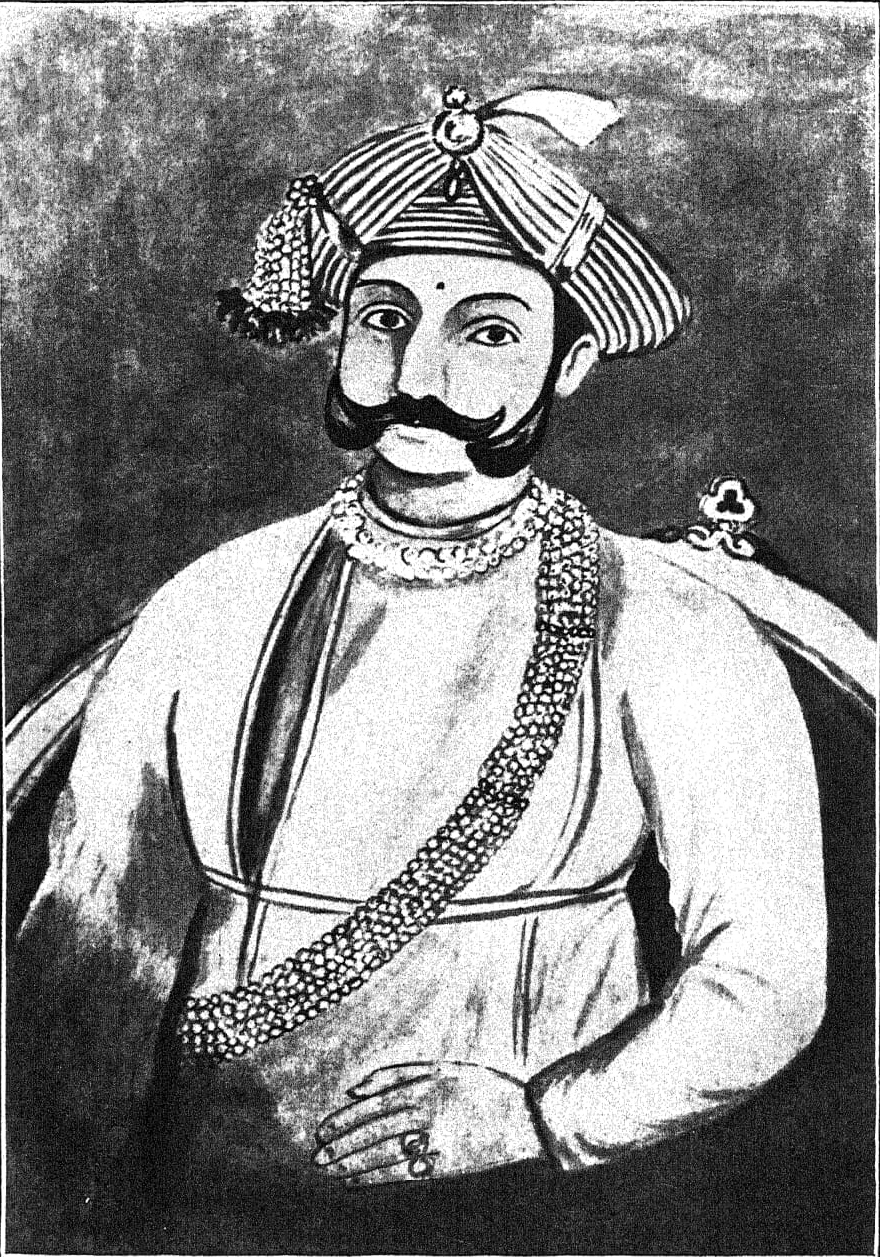
Pilaji Rao, the founder of the dynasty

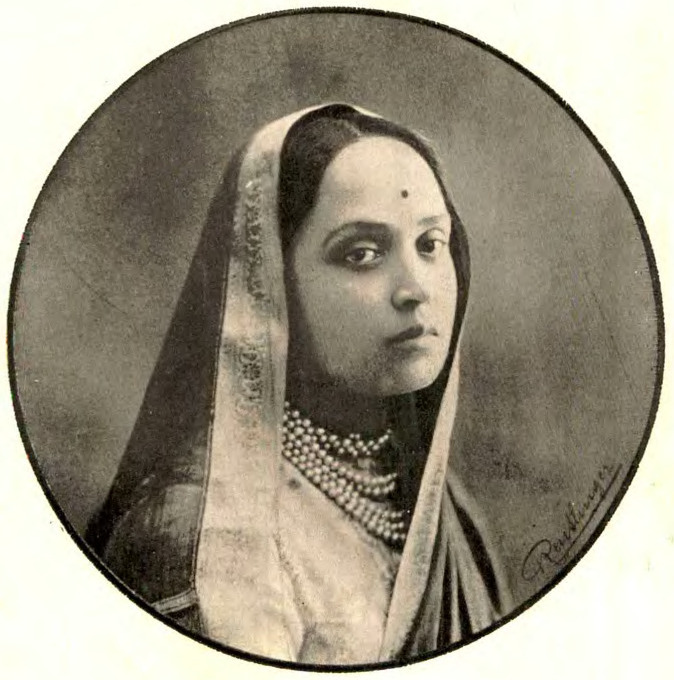
Maharani Gaikwad of Baroda (1907)

- Nandaji Rao Gaikwad, died May 1721
  - Kerojirao
    - Jhingojirao
      - Pilaji Rao Gaikwad, reigned from 1721, died 14 May 1732
        - I. Damaji Rao, reigned from 1732, died 18 August 1768
          - II. Sayaji Rao I, reigned 1768–1778, died 1792
          - III. Fateh Singh Rao I, born before April 1751, reigned from 1778, died 26 December 1789
          - IV. Manaji Rao, born before April 1751, reigned from 1789, died 27 July 1793
          - V. Govind Rao, born 175?, reigned from 1793, died 19 September 1800
            - VI. Anand Rao, born 179?, reigned from 1800, died 2 October 1819
            - VI. Sayajirao II, born 3 May 1800, reigned from 1819, died 28 December 1847
              - VII. Ganpat Rao, born 1816, reigned from 1847, died 1856
              - VIII. Khanderao II GCSI, born 1828, reigned from 1856, died 14 June 1870
              - IX. Malhar Rao, born 1831, reigned 1870 – 19 April 1875, died in obscurity in 1882
        - Prataprao (d. 1737 Kavlana branch)
          - Kalojirao
            - Gabajirao
              - Bhikajirao
                - Kashirao (1832-1877)
                  - X. Sayajirao III GCSI, GCIE, born 10 March 1863, reigned from 1875, died 6 February 1939
                    - Yuvraja Fatehsinhrao (1883-1908)
                      - XI. Pratap Singh Rao GCIE, born 29 June 1908, reigned from 1939, titular Maharaja from 1949, deposed 1951, died 19 July 1968
                        - XII. Fatehsinhrao II, born 2 April 1930, titular Maharaja 1951–1971, family head: 1971–1988, died 1 September 1988
                        - XIII. Ranjitsinh, born 8 May 1938, family head from 1988, died 9 May 2012
                          - XIV. Samarjitsinh, born 25 April 1967, family head since 2012

== Family tree ==
Gaekwad dynasty and the Family tree of the Maharajas of Baroda

Pilaji Rao^{(1)} r. 1721-1732
Damaji Rao^{(2)} r. 1732-1768	Pratap Rao
Sayaji; Rao I^{(3)} r. 1768-1778	Fateh; Singh Rao^{(4)} r. 1778-1789	Govind Rao^{(6)} r. 1793-1800	Manaji Rao^{(5)} r. 1789-1793	Kaloji Rao
Anand Rao^{(7)} r. 1800-1819	Sayaji; Rao II^{(8)} r. 1819-1847	Gabaji Rao
Ganpat Rao^{(9)} r. 1847-1856	Khande Rao^{(10)} r. 1856-1870	Malhar Rao^{(11)} r. 1870-1875	Bhikaji Rao
Kashi Rao
Sayaji; Rao III^{(12)} r. 1875-1939
Fateh Singh; Rao
Pratap; Singh Rao^{(13)} r. 1939-1949 – Titular – r. 1949-1951
Fateh; Singh; Rao II^{(14)} – Titular – r. 1951-1971; Head of the Family; 1971-1988	Ranjit; Singh Rao^{(15)} Head of the Family; 1988-2012
Samarjit; Singh^{(16)} Head of the Family; 2012-present

== See also ==
- List of Maratha dynasties and states
- Bhonsle
- Scindia
- Holkar
