= Ganpat Rao Gaekwad =

Maharaja of Baroda from 1847 to 1856

- Sena Khas Khel Shamsher Bahadur
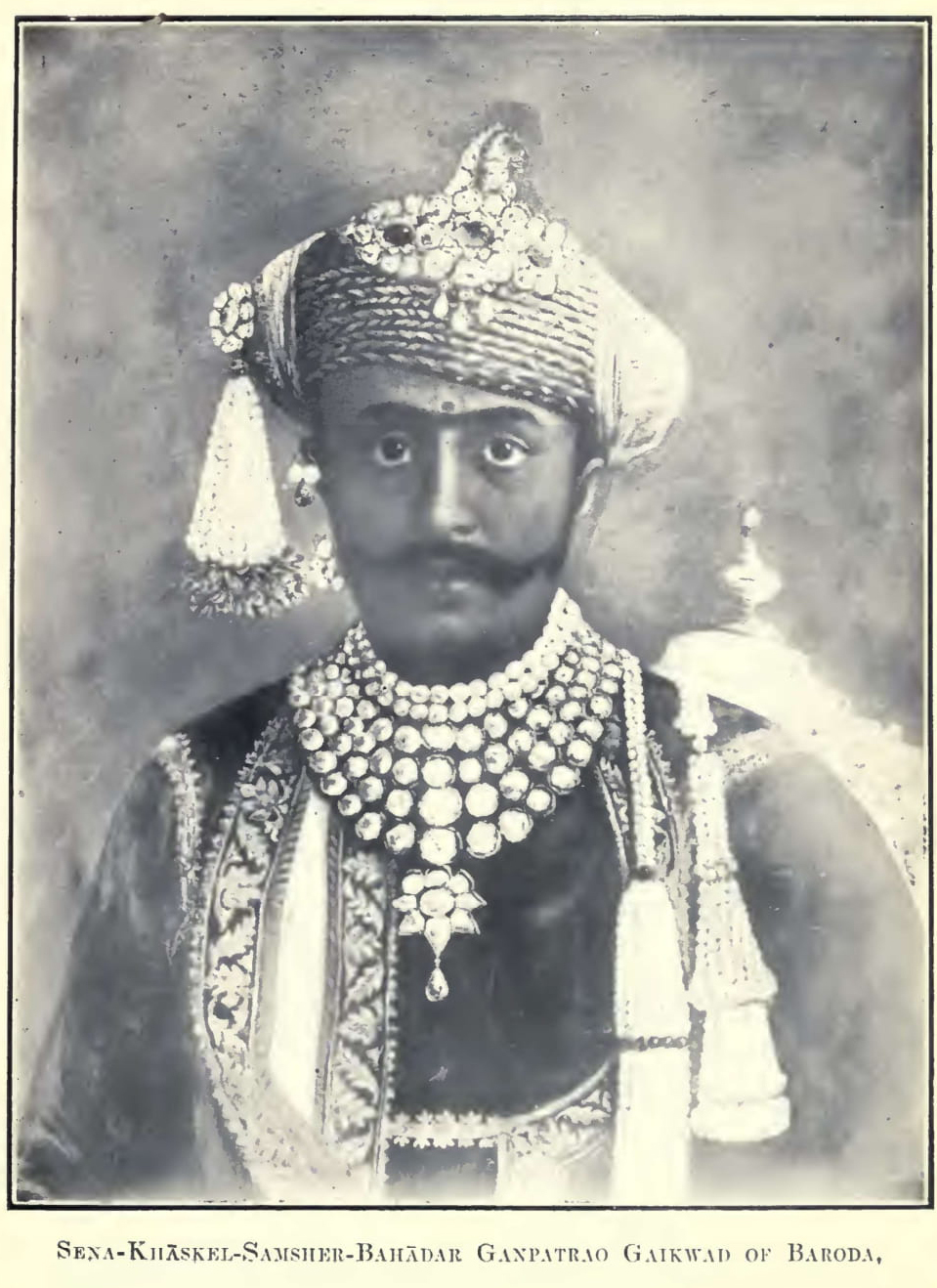

9th Maharaja of Baroda
- Reign: 1847 - 19 November 1856
- Predecessor: Sayaji Rao Gaekwad II
- Successor: Khanderao II Gaekwad
- Born: c. 1816
- Died: 19 November 1856 (aged 39–40)
- House: Gaekwad
- Father: Sayaji Rao Gaekwad II
- Religion: Hinduism

Ganpat Rao Gaekwad was the ninth Maharaja of Baroda State reigning from 1847 to 1856. He was the eldest son of Sayaji Rao Gaekwad II and became Maharaja of Baroda after the death of his father.

He died in 1856 and after his death, he was succeeded by his second younger brother Khanderao II Gaekwad.

== See also ==
- Gaekwad dynasty
