= Fateh Singh Rao Gaekwad =

Maharaja of Baroda from 1778 to 1789

Fateh Singh Rao
- Sena Khas Khel
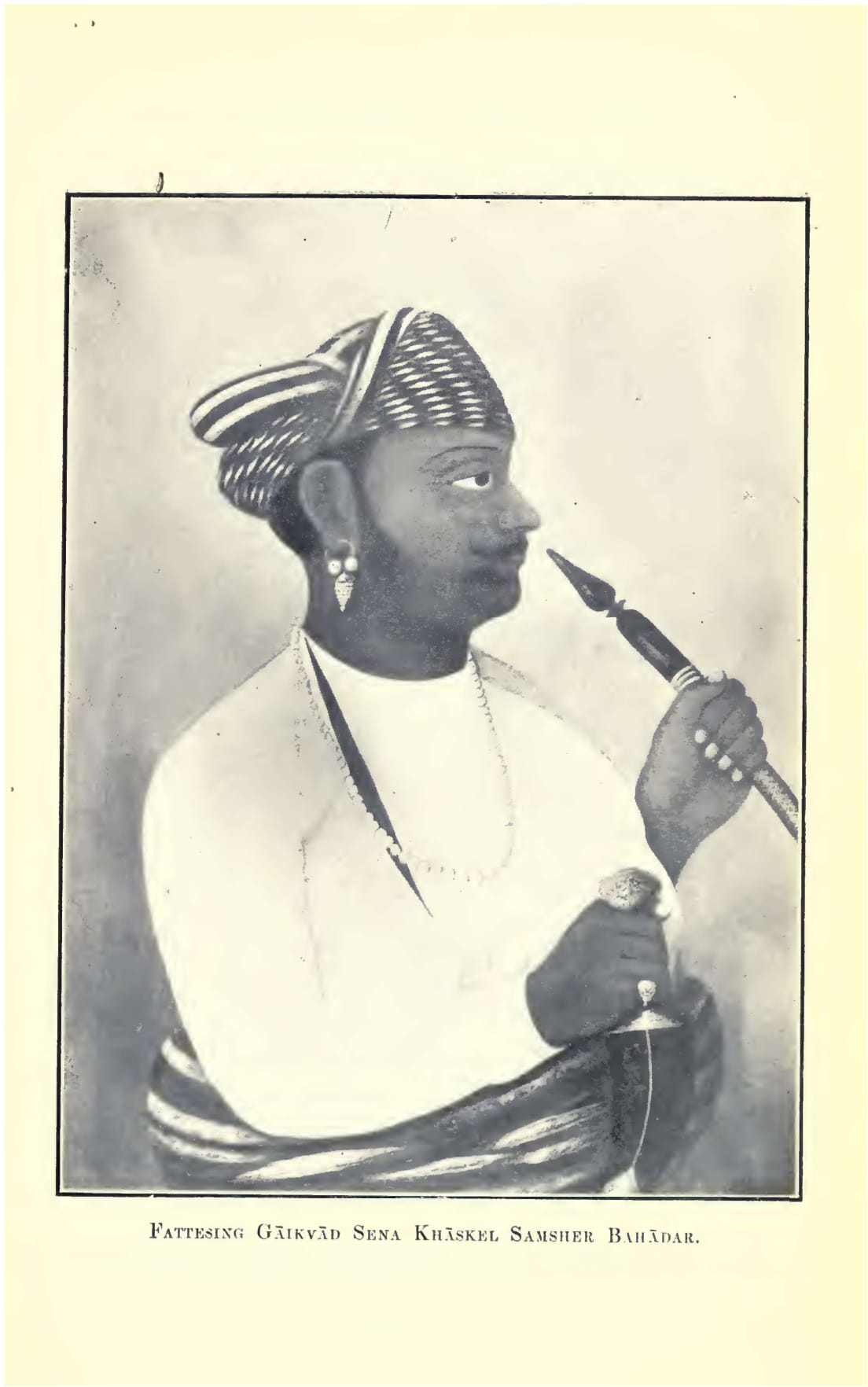

Maharaja of Baroda
- Reign: 1778 – 26 December 1789
- Predecessor: Sayaji Rao I Gaekwad
- Successor: Manaji Rao Gaekwad
- Died: 26 December 1789; Baroda
- House: Gaekwad
- Father: Damaji Rao Gaekwad
- Religion: Hinduism

Fateh Singh Rao Gaekwad (before April 1751 – 26 December 1789) was the Maharaja of Baroda from 1778 until his death in 1789. He was the third son of Damaji Rao Gaekwad.

== See also ==
- Gaekwad dynasty
