= Sayajirao Gaekwad II =

Maharaja of Baroda from 1819 to 1847

Sayaji Rao Gaekwad II
- Sena Khas Khel

8th Maharaja of Baroda
- Reign: 1819 - 1847
- Predecessor: Anand Rao Gaekwad
- Successor: Ganpat Rao Gaekwad
- Died: 1847
- House: Gaekwad
- Father: Govind Rao Gaekwad
- Religion: Hinduism

Sayaji Rao Gaekwad II was the eight Maharaja of Baroda State reigning from 1819 to 1847. He became Maharaja of Baroda after the death of Anand Rao Gaekwad. He was the third son of Govind Rao Gaekwad.

== Succession ==
He died in 1847 and was succeeded by Ganpat Rao Gaekwad as the new Maharaja of Baroda state.

== See also ==
- Gaekwad dynasty
