= Sayajirao Gaekwad I =

Maharaja of Baroda from 1768 to 1778

Sayaji Rao I
- Sena Khas Khel

Maharaja of Baroda
- Reign: 18 August 1768 – 1778
- Predecessor: Damaji Rao Gaekwad
- Successor: Fateh Singh Rao Gaekwad
- Died: 1792
- House: Gaekwad
- Father: Damaji Rao Gaekwad
- Religion: Hinduism

Sayaji Rao Gaekwad (died 1792) was the Maharaja of Baroda from 1768 to 1778. He was the eldest son of Damaji Rao Gaekwad.

== See also ==
- Gaekwad dynasty
