= Damaji Rao Gaekwad =

Maharaja of Baroda from 1732 to 1768

- Sena Khas Khel
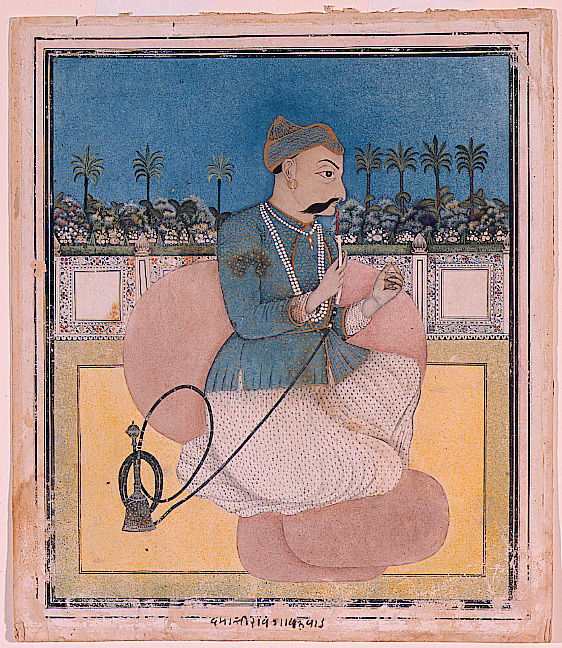
- Portrait of Damaji Rao Gaekwad

2nd Maharaja of Baroda
- Reign: 14 May 1732 – 18 August 1768
- Predecessor: Pilaji Rao Gaekwad
- Successor: Sayajirao I
- Died: 18 August 1768; Patan, Baroda State, Maratha Confederacy (modern-day Gujarat, India)
- Issue: Sayajirao I
- House: Gaekwad
- Father: Pilaji Rao Gaekwad
- Religion: Hinduism

Damaji Rao Gaekwad (died 18 August 1768) was the second Maharaja of Baroda reigning from 14 May 1732 until his death on 18 August 1768.

== Early life ==
Damaji, also known as Damaji II, was the third son of Pilaji Rao Gaekwad. His father Pilaji was an adopted son of Damaji I, who had received the hereditary title Shamsher Bahadur from Chhattrapati Shahu. Pilaji himself had received another hereditary title, Sena Khas Khel.

== Rebellion against the Peshwa ==
The Gaekwads were originally lieutenants of the Dabhade family, the Maratha chiefs of Gujarat and holders of the senapati (commander-in-chief) title. In 1731, Trimbak Rao Dabhade was killed for rebelling against Peshwa Baji Rao. The Peshwa allowed the Dabhades to retain their title and territories in Gujarat, on the condition that they would remit half of their revenues to the Maratha Chhatrapati's treasury. His minor brother Yashwant Rao Dabhade was appointed as the senapati, with his mother Umabai Dabhade exercising the executive powers. Pilaji, and after his death in 1732, Damaji held the actual military power as Yashwant Rao was a minor. Even as he grew up, Yashwant Rao got addicted to alcohol and opium, and Damaji gradually increased his power during this time.

Umabai initially pretended reconciliation with Peshwa Bajirao, but maintained a grudge against him for killing her son. After Bajirao's death, she pleaded with the new Peshwa Balaji Rao, to release the Dabhades from the revenue-sharing covenant. When he refused to do so, she sided with Tarabai in a rebellion against the Peshwa. When Balaji Baji Rao left for the Mughal frontier, Tarabai imprisoned Chhatrapati Rajaram II and Umabai dispatched Damaji Gaekwad with a 15,000-strong force to support her.

On 13 March, the Peshwa loyalist Trimbakrao Purandare set out from Pune to intercept Damaji. His force was shortly supplemented by contingents led by Balwantrao Mehendale and Bapuji Retharekar, and grew into a 20,000-strong army. Despite being numerically inferior, Damaji's army defeated them at Nimb, a small town north of Satara. A victorious Damaji then reached Satara, where he was received by Tarabai. However, Trimbakrao re-formed his army. On 15 March, he launched a fresh attack on Damaji's troops, who were encamped on the banks of the Venna River. Damaji was defeated in this battle, and forced to retreat with heavy losses. Trimbakrao continued pursuing him, eventually trapping him a gorge in the Krishna River valley. Meanwhile, the Peshwa returned from the Mughal frontier, and joined Trimbakrao. Damaji's Maratha troops deserted him, while his Gujarati troops lost hope in an unfamiliar locality. He was, therefore, compelled to declare ceasefire and meet Peshwa to discuss the terms of a peace treaty. The Peshwa demanded half of Gujarat's territories in addition to a war indemnity of ₹ 2,500,000. Damaji refused to sign an agreement, stating that he was only a subordinate, and asked Peshwa to consult Umabai. On 30 April, the Peshwa launched a surprise evening attack on Damaji's camp, which surrendered without resistance.

In May 1751, the Peshwa arrested Damaji Gaekwad and his relatives, and sent them to Pune. Sometime later, the Dabhades were also arrested, and deprived of their jagirs and titles. In Pune, the Peshwa repeatedly pressurized Damaji to cede half of Gujarat on behalf of Yashwant Rao Dabhade. Damaji kept refusing, and on 19 July 1751, the Peshwa placed him and his dewan Ramchandra Baswant in strict confinement. On 14 November, he sent them to a captivity in Lohagad.

A few weeks later, Ramchandra Baswant managed to escape and reached Gujarat, where he met Damaji's relatives at the Songadh fort. The Peshwa put Damaji in iron chains at Lohagad, and sent a force under his brother Raghunathrao to Gujarat. Raghunathrao managed to recover revenues from Surat, but could not advance north of the Tapti River. Meanwhile, the Peshwa suffered setbacks in some other battles, and decided to seek reconciliation with the Gaekwads.

== As the Maratha chief in Gujarat ==
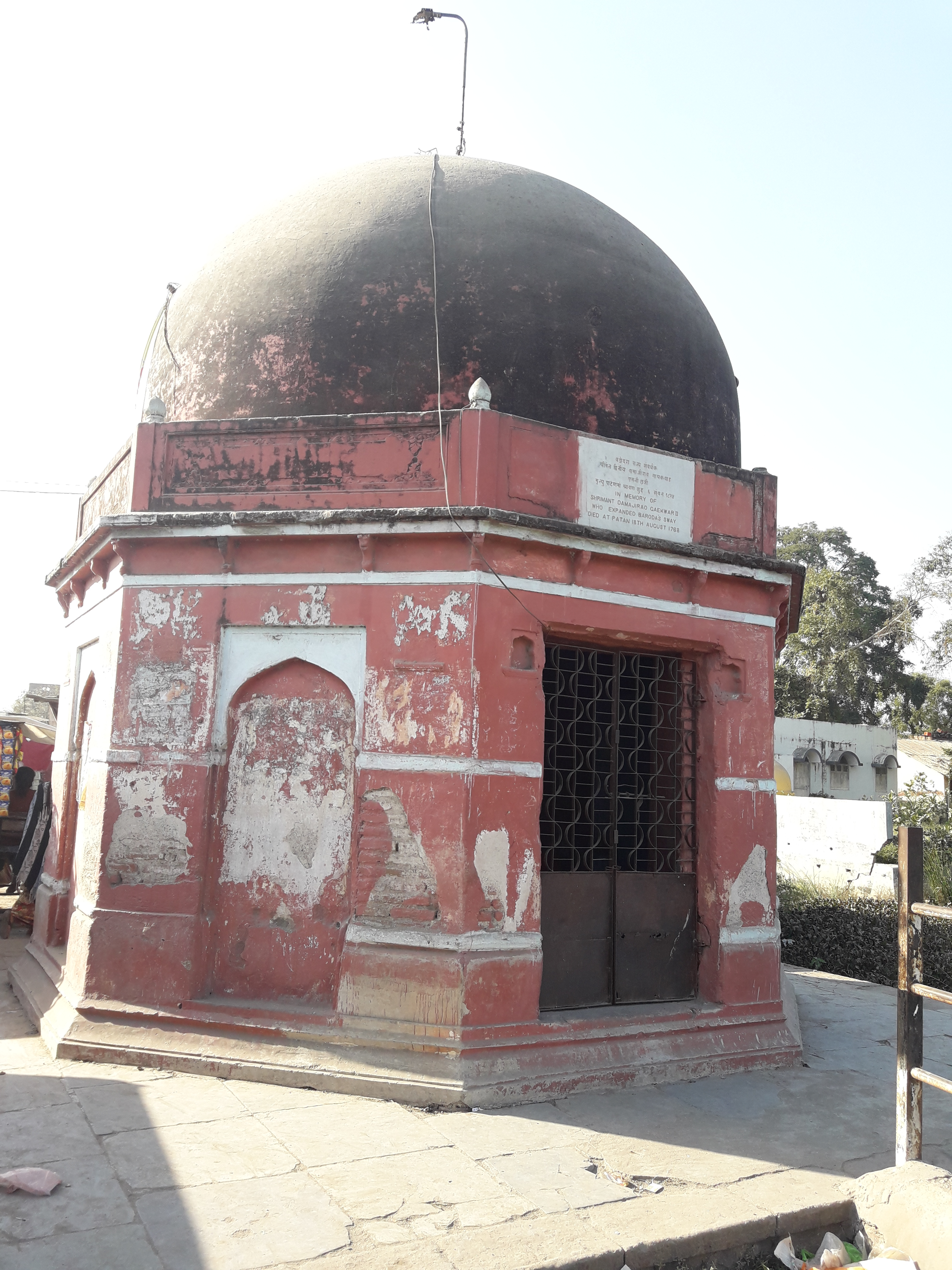
Damajino Dero, a memorial dedicated to him located at Savli, Gujarat

In March 1752, Damaji finally agreed to abandon Dabhades in favour of the Peshwa. In return, he was made the Maratha chief of Gujarat, and the Peshwa offered him assistance in expelling the Mughals from Gujarat. Gaekwad promised to pay an annual tribute of ₹ 525,000 to Peshwa in addition to a one-time payment of ₹ 1,500,000. He was also asked to maintain a cavalry of 20,000 horses in service of the Peshwa. The Dabhade family was respectfully removed from power, and provided an annual maintenance expense by Gaekwad.

On 10 December 1752, Peshwa Balaji Baji Rao dispatched an army from Pune to Gujarat, under the commandment of Raghunathrao. This army was joined by Damaji's troops, resulting in the formation of a 50,000-strong Maratha army. The Marathas sieged Ahmedabad, where the Mughal Governor Jawan Mard Khan Babi put up a strong defence. Babi surrendered Ahmedabad in March 1753 after a long siege. The Peshwa appointed Shripatrao Bapuji as the Governor of Ahmedabad; a part of the city was given to Damaji. In July 1756, the Nawab of Cambay Momin Khan invaded Ahmedabad with Mughal support, while Shripatrao was away in Pune. The Peshwa sent a force led by Sadashiv Shenvi, which regained control of Ahmedabad with Damaji's help. Subsequently, the town remained under the Marathas until the First Anglo-Maratha War. The British later handed it over to Damaji's son Fateh Singh Rao Gaekwad after the Treaty of Salbai in 1782.

He died at Patan on 18 August 1768.

== Gaekwad Navy ==
Northwards of Thana i.e. in Gujarat Damajirao Gaekwad had his own Navy.

Damaji Rao Gaekwad commanded a bold fleet that attacked English and Dutch ships at Surat. In 1757, his forces captured an English boat and the galbat Shark, prompting the Dutch and English to plan a joint attack on his fleet based in Billimora. Appaji Gopal, a notorious pirate known as the Billimora Pandit, was enough to make the British hesitant to confront him.

The relationship between Appaji Gopal and Damaji is unclear; the English were instructed to avoid Damaji's ports while pursuing Gopal, suggesting Gopal operated independently. By 1764, Jayaramrao Appaji led Damaji's fleet, refusing to return an English ship that had washed ashore, citing a prior incident.

The Gaekwad fleet was not under the Peshwa's control, despite their nominal allegiance, and they frequently defied his authority, rarely cooperating during critical moments.
