= Gaekwad =

Gaikwad (also spelt Gaikwar and Gaikwad; Marathi: Gāyǎkǎvāḍǎ) is a clan of Marathas.

It has also been adopted by other communities such as the Kunbi, Koli, Mali & Mahar castes.

== Notable people ==
- Anshuman Gaikwad, Indian cricketer and coach
- Rajeshwari Gayakwad, Indian cricketer
- Raju Gaikwad, footballer
- Ravindra Gaikwad, Indian politician
- Ruturaj Gaikwad, Indian cricketer
- Shivaji Rao Gaikwad, known by his stage name Rajinikanth, Indian actor
- Sunil Gaikwad, Indian politician from Maharashtra

== See also ==
- Caste system in India
