= Saxon (disambiguation) =

The Saxons were a Germanic people during the Early Middle Ages, related to the Anglo-Saxons.

Saxon may also refer to:

== Places ==
=== United States ===
- Saxon, South Carolina, a census-designated place
- Saxon, West Virginia, an unincorporated community
- Saxon, Wisconsin, a town
  - Saxon (CDP), Wisconsin, an unincorporated census-designated place within the town
- Saxon Harbor, a harbor in Wisconsin
- Saxon Boulevard, a road in Volusia County, Florida

=== Elsewhere ===
- Saxon, Switzerland, a district of Martigny, canton of Valais
- Saxon River, New Zealand
- Saxon Elbeland, area near a river in Germany
- Saxon Street, a village in Woodditton parish, Cambridgeshire, England
- Saxon Uplands, hilly countryside in Saxony, Germany

== Arts and entertainment ==
- Saxon (band), a British heavy metal band, formed in 1975
  - Saxon (album), a 1979 debut album by the band Saxon
- The Saxons, the original name of Scottish pop band Bay City Rollers
- Sky Saxon, a stage name of American rock and roll musician Richard Marsh (1937-2009)
- "Saxon", a song by Chase & Status
- Saxon (film), a 2007 independent British film
- Gar Saxon, a Mandalorian commander in the Star Wars universe
- Tiber Saxon, a fictional Star Wars character in the animated series Star Wars Rebels
- Harold Saxon, a pseudonym of The Master, an enemy of Doctor Who
- Saxon Garvey, a character in the Australian soap opera Neighbours
- Peter Saxon, house pseudonym used by various thriller writers from the 1950s to the 1970s
- Machinesmith, a Marvel Universe villain born Samuel "Starr" Saxon
- Saxon Greeting, a gymnastic routine performed by women in Nazi Germany
- Saxon World Chronicle, 13th century German universal history
- The Saxon Stories, series of historical novels by Bernard Cornwell

== People ==
- Saxon (given name)
- Saxon (surname)
- Bruno the Saxon, 11th-century German chronicler of the eleventh century
- nickname of Matthew Saxon McEwan, late 19th century Scottish rugby football player
- Alex Saxon, pen name of Bill Pronzini (born 1943), American writer of detective fiction
- Inhabitants of one of three modern states (Länder) of Germany: Lower Saxony, Saxony and Saxony-Anhalt
- Inhabitants of one of the predecessor states to the modern German states; see Saxony (disambiguation)#Historical German states

== Other uses ==
- Saxon language (disambiguation), various old and modern languages
- Saxon pound, unit of currency in Anglo-Saxon England
- Saxon thaler, historical currency of the Kingdom of Saxony
- Saxon White, a large diamond from India
- Saxon (firework), a ground-based pyrotechnic device
- Saxon (horse), an American racehorse who won the 1874 Belmont Stakes
- Saxon Gold rabbit, a breed of rabbit
- Saxon Colour pigeons, a group of Saxon breeds of fancy pigeons
  - Saxon Fairy Swallow pigeon, a breed of fancy pigeon
  - Saxon Monk, a breed of fancy pigeon
  - Saxon Spot, a breed of fancy pigeon
  - Saxon Shield, a breed of fancy pigeon
- Saxon wasp, common social wasp found in Europe and Asia
- Saxon (vehicle), a British Army armoured personnel carrier
- Saxon Motor Car Company, American car maker from 1914 to 1922
  - Saxon (automobile), produced from 1913 to 1923
- Saxon Mill, former mill at Guy's Cliffe, Warwickshire, England
- Saxon-Upper Lusatian Railway Company, German railway company
- Saxon math, a mathematics learning program for grades K-12
- Saxon Studio International, London reggae sound system
- Saxon XSLT, an open-source XSLT and XQuery processor
- Alfred Saxons, an American collegiate athletic program
- England Saxons, current name of that country's "A" (second-level) men's national rugby union team
- Transylvanian Saxons, an ethnic German minority in Transylvania, Romania, who settled there from 12th century

== See also ==
- Saxån, a river in Sweden
- Saxen, a district in Austria
- Saxony (disambiguation)
