= Saxonia =

Saxonia may refer to:

- Latin for Saxony
- Saxonia (locomotive), first locomotive built in Germany in 1838
- British Rail Class 40 diesel locomotive D229, built by English Electric at Newton-le-Willows, Lancashire
- RMS Saxonia, more than one passenger ship of the Cunard Line
- The Saxonia Guest House in Somerset, England, featured on the show The Hotel Inspector

== See also ==
- Saxon (disambiguation)
- Saxony (disambiguation)
