= Saxony (disambiguation) =

Saxony is a historical region in Germany and a federal state.

Saxony may also refer to:

== Other current German states ==
- Saxony-Anhalt
- Lower Saxony

== Historical German states ==
- Old Saxony (unknown–785), tribal territory of the Saxons
- Duchy of Saxony (804–1296), the settlement area of the Saxons in the late Early Middle Ages
- Electorate of Saxony (1356–1806), a state of the Holy Roman Empire
- Kingdom of Saxony (1806–1918), a state in Germany; successively a member of the Confederation of the Rhine, German Confederation, North German Confederation and German Empire
- Province of Saxony (1816–1945), a province of the Kingdom of Prussia and later the Free State of Prussia
- Gau Saxony (1926–45), an administrative division of Nazi Germany
- State of Saxony (1945–1952), an administrative division of Soviet-occupied Germany and of East Germany

== People ==
- Jordan of Saxony, or Jordan von Sachsen

== Ships ==
- Sachsen-class ironclad (1875)
  - SMS Sachsen (1877), the lead ship of that class
- SMS Sachsen (1916), a Bayern-class battleship
- Sachsen-class frigate, Germany's latest class of highly advanced air-defense frigates
  - German frigate Sachsen (F219), the lead ship of that class
- German weather ship WBS 1 Sachsen, formerly FV Sachsen, a trawler converted to a weather ship during World War II
- FV Sachsen, a sealer built in 1938, requisitioned by the Kriegsmarine in 1940 as German weather ship WBS 11 Hessen

== Other ==
- Upper Saxony, name given to German lands held by the House of Wettin in what is now called Central Germany
- Saxony (duck), breed of duck
- Saxony (wine region), the wine region of Saxony
- Saxony Hotel, in Miami Beach, Florida, US
- Saxony Mill, building listed on the National Register of Historic Places in Rockville, Connecticut, US
- Sachsen bei Ansbach, town in the district of Ansbach, Bavaria, Germany
- Saxony yarn, a fine yarn spun from saxony wool
- Saxony (group), a short-lived Australian band of the mid-1970s

== See also ==
- Saxon (disambiguation)
- Saxonia (disambiguation)
- Saxons, a confederation of Old Germanic tribes, originally from northern Germany
- History of Saxony
- List of rulers of Saxony
- Saxo Grammaticus
- Saxe (disambiguation)
- 13th Mechanized Infantry Division
