= Dresden Green Diamond =

41-carat (8.2 g) natural green diamond

Dresden Green
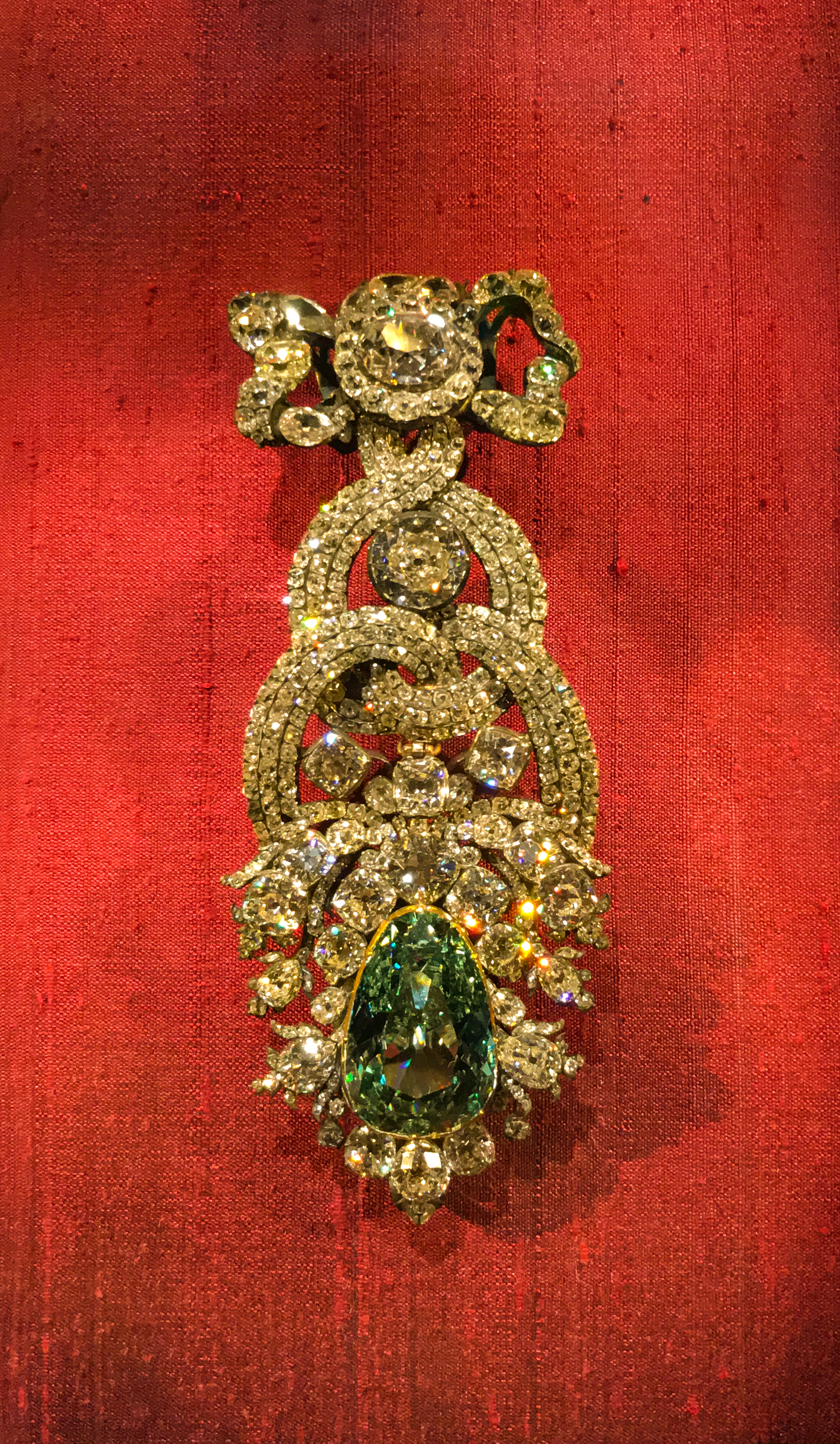
- The diamond in its hat clasp ornament
- Weight: 41 carats (8.2 g)
- Colour: Natural green
- Country of origin: India
- Mine of origin: Kollur Mine
- Discovered: Before 1722

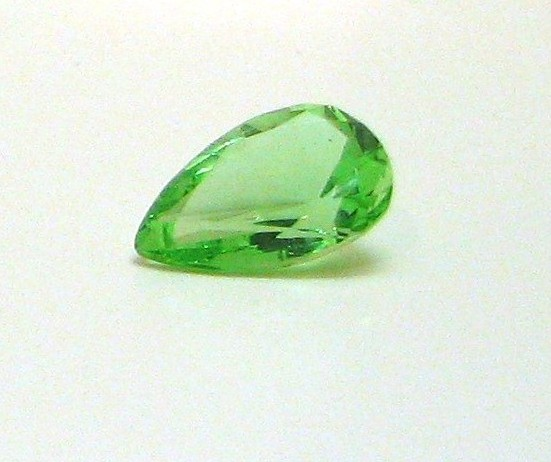
Glass copy of the Dresden Green

The Dresden Green Diamond, also known as the Dresden Green, is a 41-carat (8.2 g) natural green diamond which originated in the mines of India. The Dresden Green is a rare Type IIa, with a clarity of VS1 and is said to be potentially internally flawless, if slightly recut.

It is named after Dresden, the capital of the German state of Saxony, where it has been on display for most of the last two centuries, latterly in the New Green Vault at Dresden Castle. After World War II, it was relocated to Moscow for a decade before being returned to Dresden. In November 2019, it was sent on loan to the Metropolitan Museum of Art in New York City, so it was not taken in the jewel theft of 25 November.

== History ==
The Dresden Green Diamond has a historical record dating back to 1722, when a London news-sheet carried an article about it in its 25 October-27th edition. It was acquired by Augustus III of Poland from a Dutch merchant in 1742 at the Leipzig Fair. In 1768, the diamond was incorporated into an extremely valuable hat ornament, surrounded by two large and 411 medium-sized and small diamonds. This is the setting that the Dresden Green still appears in today.

In 2000, American jewelry firm Harry Winston arranged to display the Dresden Green at the New York flagship store and then at the Smithsonian in Washington, DC, United States, where it was displayed in the Harry Winston pavilion next to the largest blue diamond in the world, the Hope Diamond.

In 2019, the Dresden Green Diamond narrowly escaped being stolen in the Dresden Green Vault burglary, due to it being loaned to New York's Metropolitan Museum of Art at the time.

== Colour ==
The stone's unique apple green colour is due to natural exposure to radioactive materials, as the irradiation of diamonds can produce changes in colour. The Dresden Green Diamond has been used to compare natural versus lab-produced green diamonds — it is hoped that it can be used to devise a test to differentiate between naturally green diamonds, which are quite rare, and lab-produced ones.

== In popular culture ==
The plot of Nicolas Freeling's 1966 novel The Dresden Green concerns an imaginary theft of the Dresden Green diamond and attempts to recover it.

== See also ==
- Golconda Diamonds
- List of diamonds
