= Dresden Green Vault burglary =

2019 jewellery theft in Germany

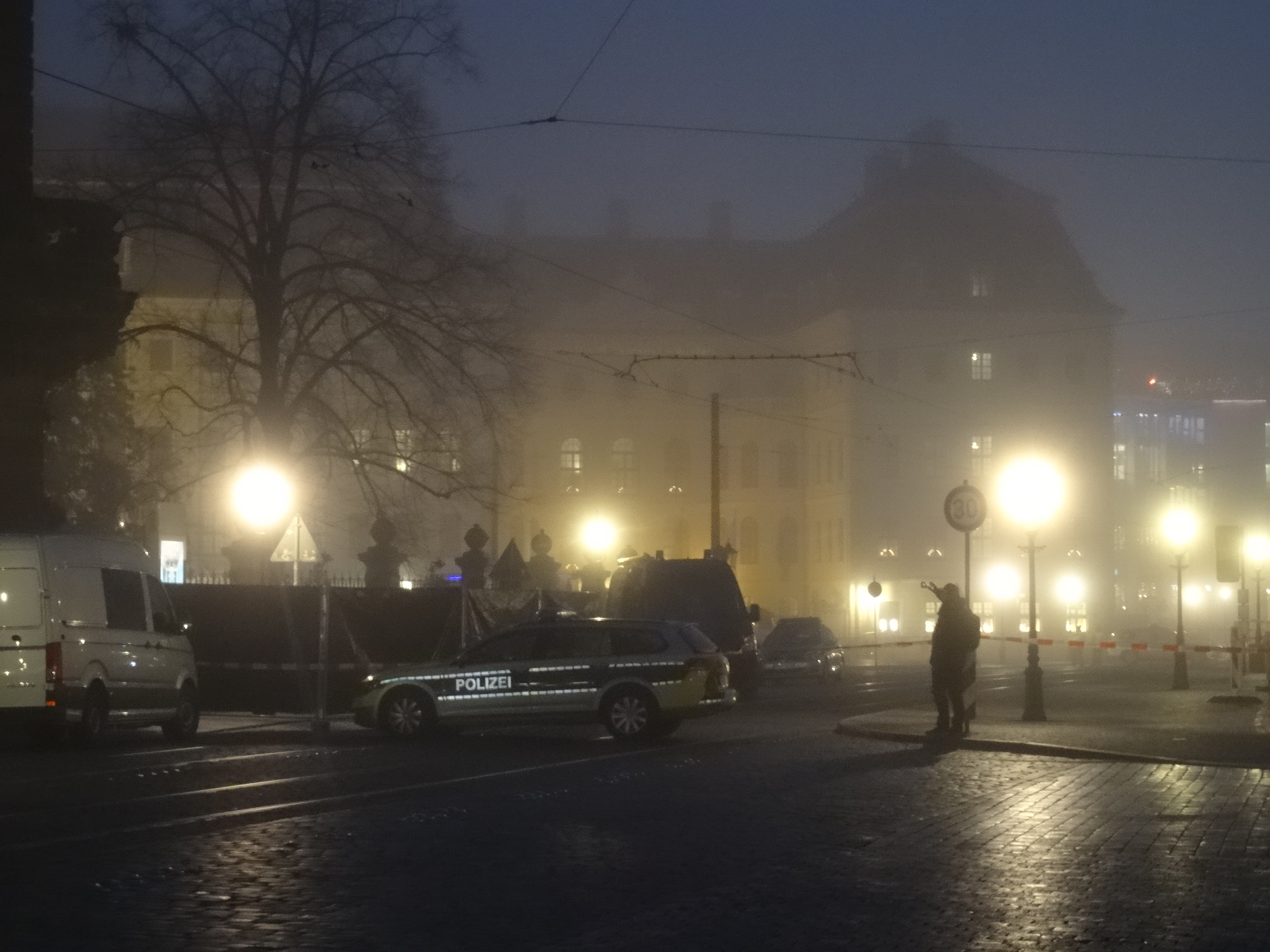
- Crime scene at the window used for entry
- Date: 25 November 2019
- Time: 04:56 a.m CET (UTC+1)
- Venue: The Green Vault, Dresden Castle
- Location: Dresden, Saxony, Germany
- Type: Jewellery burglary
- Suspects: At least two unidentified individuals
- Stolen value: €113 million

On 25 November 2019, royal jewellery was stolen from the Green Vault museum within Dresden Castle in Dresden, Saxony, Germany. The stolen items included the 62-carat Dresden White Diamond, the diamond-laden breast star of the Polish Order of the White Eagle which belonged to the King of Poland, a hat clasp with a 16-carat diamond, a diamond epaulette, and a diamond-studded hilt containing nine large and 770 smaller diamonds, along with a matching scabbard. The missing items were of great cultural value to the State of Saxony and were described as priceless; other sources estimate the total value at about €1 billion. However, in the years following the burglary, more accurate estimates place the total value of the stolen items at around €113 million.

In 2022, thirty-one of the stolen items were recovered by the German authorities in Berlin, reportedly after talks with the lawyers of six men on trial for the theft.

== Museum ==
Jewel Room (labelled 8) within the Green Vault

The burglary took place at the Green Vault (German: Grünes Gewölbe) in Dresden, Saxony, Germany, one of the oldest museums in Europe, founded in 1723 by Augustus II the Strong, Elector of Saxony and King of Poland. At the time of the heist, it displayed about 4,000 items of jewellery and other treasures which were decorated with gold, silver, ivory, pearl, and other precious metals and stones. One of the museum's main treasures, the 41-carat Dresden Green Diamond, was away on loan at New York's Metropolitan Museum of Art.

== Heist ==
External videos
- CCTV footage of the heist
- See the 'Priceless' 18th-Century Jewels Stolen

On 25 November 2019, at 4 a.m. a small fire was started on the nearby Augustus Bridge, which destroyed a power box. The resulting power outage disabled streetlights and security alarms, but CCTV continued to function. The thieves then cut through iron bars around a window to break into the museum's Jewel Room. According to police, the thieves must have been very small to fit through the hole. CCTV footage shows two thieves within the vaults. They smashed the glass displays with an axe to gain access to the jewellery.

The thieves removed three 18th-century jewellery sets consisting of 37 parts each, including diamonds, rubies, emeralds, and sapphires. The thieves were not able to take all of the pieces from the three jewellery sets; some jewellery was sewn into the surface of the cabinet and those pieces remained. However, they also took the Dresden White Diamond worth €9–10 million. The thieves exited through the same window, replacing the bars in order to delay detection. The robbery was detected by the guards at 4:56 a.m. and 16 police cars were dispatched to the museum. Security guards stationed at the museum followed protocol after the heist was discovered and did not engage with the robbers, as the guards were unarmed; they instead notified police.

== Stolen items ==
One of the stolen pieces was a small sword, described as an épée made of silver and gold with a hilt of nine large and 770 smaller diamonds. Another was a brooch-style jewel worn by Queen Amalie Auguste which featured at least 660 gemstones. Police identified a jewelled Polish White Eagle Order and a diamond epaulette as among the items stolen. Also believed to be stolen was a diamond hat clasp comprising 15 large diamonds and more than 100 small ones, the largest being a 16-carat diamond, made in the 1780s and worn by Frederick Augustus III. An Order of the White Eagle breast star by the diamond-cutter Jean Jacques Pallard, made up of a 20-carat diamond at its centre and a Maltese cross of red rubies, was also taken.

=== Estimated value ===
The state prosecutor's office listed the value of the robbery at €113 million. The original estimated total value of stolen items, according to Bild, was more than €1 billion (US$1.1 billion) which would make it the largest museum heist in history, surpassing the Isabella Stewart Gardner Museum theft of 1990. According to NPR, the "material value seems to have fallen short of $1 billion". Marion Ackermann, director of Dresden State Art Collections, said that it was impossible to estimate the price of the stolen items due to their historic cultural value. Saxony's interior minister, Roland Wöller, also stated that the cultural loss "is impossible to estimate".

== Investigation ==
The first police car was called to the building at 4:59 a.m. arriving five minutes later, but by that time the suspects had escaped. The police set up roadblocks on the outskirts of Dresden in an attempt to prevent the suspects from leaving. However, according to police, the museum's proximity to the autobahn is likely to have helped the suspects' escape. The police believe there were four thieves and that they fled in an Audi A6; an identical vehicle was later found on fire in an underground parking lot. Police offered a €500,000 reward for information which could lead to the capture of the perpetrators.

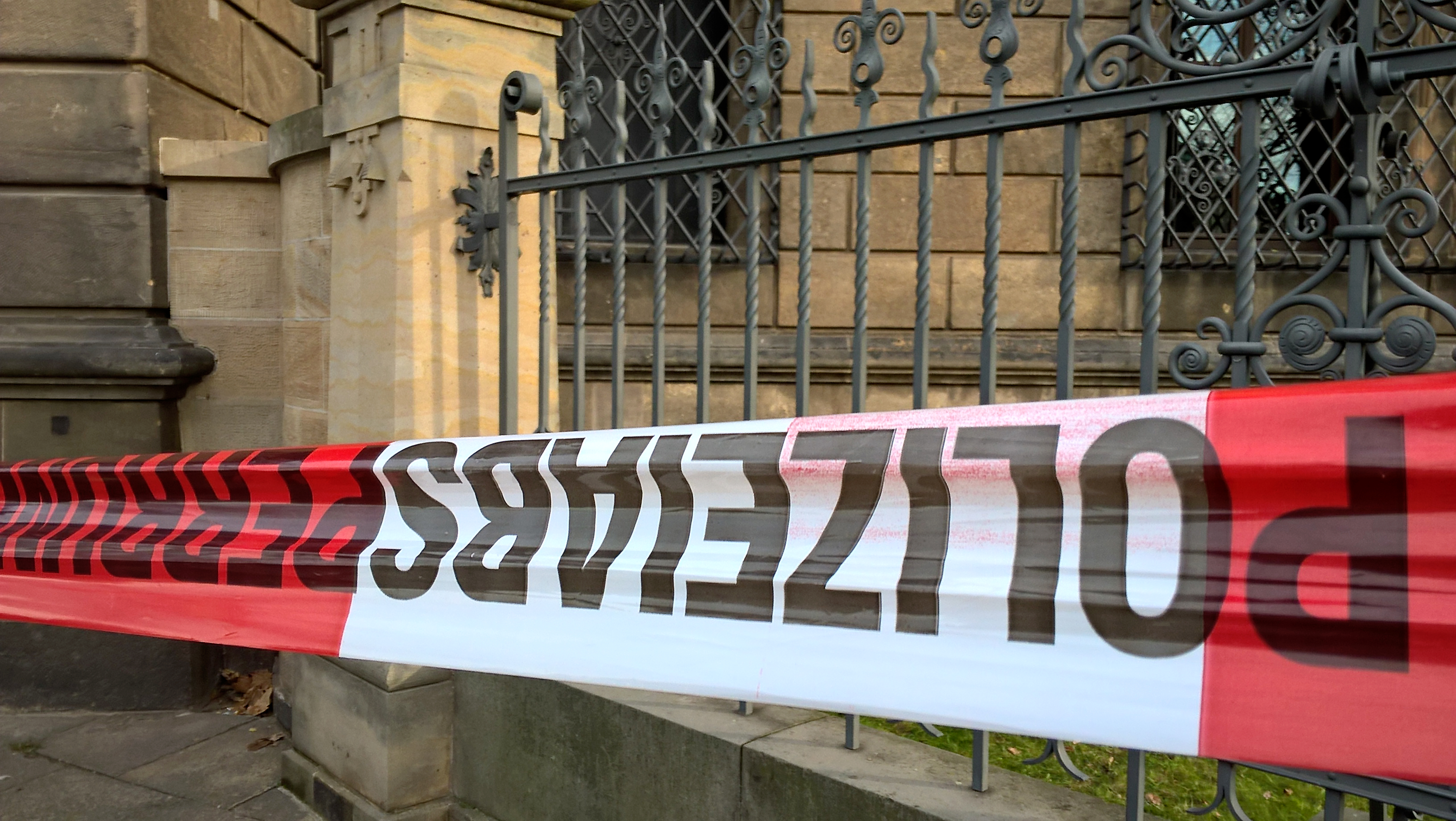
Police Barrier - Dresden Jewel Theft - November 25, 2019 - Historic Green Vault of the Residenzschloss Dresden

Starting 12 December 2019, several German media outlets reported that police were investigating links to an Arab clan in Berlin. In March 2020, police revealed that at least 7 individuals were involved in the robbery. Also in March 2020, German prosecutors announced that they were investigating four security guards as likely culprits, as they failed to "react adequately". In November 2020, thousands of police raided 18 properties in Berlin, and arrested three suspects, all from a Mhallami migrant family, in connection with the heist. Police stated that they had linked the theft to an Arab crime syndicate which had also been involved in a 2017 theft from the Bode Museum which one of the arrested suspects had participated in. Also in November, they released the names of two men, Abdul Majed Remmo and Mohamed Remmo, who they believed had been involved. In December 2020, a fourth person was arrested in connection with the Green Vault burglary, a 21-year-old male.

In January 2020, an Israeli security company said that jewels from the heist were being sold on the dark web, a claim which German investigators rejected.

== Legal ==
In September 2021, German prosecutors charged six men over the theft, accusing them of organised robbery and arson. The German nationals, aged 22 to 28, who belong to the Remmo Clan, an infamous family of Mhallami background in Berlin, were accused of breaking into the eastern city's Green Vault museum and stealing 21 pieces of jewellery containing more than 4,300 diamonds with a total insured value of at least €113.8 million ($120 million).

Prosecutors said they laid a fire just before the break-in to cut the power supply for street lights outside the museum, and also set fire to a car in a nearby garage before fleeing to Berlin. Prosecutors said the suspects, who were all in custody, had not responded to the accusations against them. CCTV footage showed suspects using a hammer to break a glass case inside the museum.

Two of the suspects were already serving sentences for participating in another major heist, the theft of a 100-kilogram Canadian gold coin dubbed the "Big Maple Leaf" from Berlin's Bode Museum in 2017. The coin, with an estimated value of €3.75 million, has not been recovered. Authorities suspect it was cut into smaller pieces and sold off. The indictment was filed at the state court in Dresden, which will now have to decide whether and when to bring the case against the men to trial.

On May 16, 2023, five members of the Remmo family were convicted by a court in Dresden. They are Rabieh Remmo, Wissam Remmo, Bashir Remmo, and two younger people whose identities were not released to the public.

== Response ==
It was feared that the thieves would alter the stolen works to sell them on the black market. Museum officials begged the thieves not to melt down any of the gold or otherwise harm the artifacts. The General Director of Dresden's state art collections told reporters that the stolen jewels could not be sold on the art market legally as they were too well known to collectors.

Saxony's Minister-President Michael Kretschmer denounced the crime on Twitter, saying "not only the state art collections were robbed, but we Saxons."

The museum reopened on 27 November 2019, although the Green Vault remained closed until reopening in August 2024 with most of the stolen items returned to their displays.

== Recovery ==
In December 2022, it was announced that a large portion of the stolen items had been recovered. Thirty-one of the items were returned to the museum after being seized by Berlin authorities following the disclosure of their location by the lawyers of the six suspects in custody.
