= Saxon language =

Saxon language may refer to:

- Old Saxon, a Germanic language and the earliest recorded form of Low German
  - Middle Saxon, a language that is the descendant of Old Saxon and the ancestor of modern Low German
  - Low Saxon language or Low German, modern successor language of Old Saxon
- Anglo-Saxon language or Old English, the ancestor of modern English
  - West Saxon dialect, one of the four main dialects of Old English
- Upper Saxon German, an East Central German dialect spoken in much of the modern German State of Saxony
- Transylvanian Saxon dialect, dialect of the Transylvanian Saxons in the Moselle Franconian group of West Central German dialects

== See also ==
- Saxon (disambiguation)
- Anglo-Frisian languages
