= Saxon (given name) =

Saxon is the given name of:

- Saxon Gregory-Hunt (born 1993), New Zealander competitive weightlifter
- Saxon W. Holt (1871-1940), American politician from Virginia
- Saxon Huxley (born 1988), British professional wrestler
- Saxon Jenkins (1907-1989), Welsh landscape painter
- Saxon Judd (1919–1990), American football player
- Saxon McEwan, Scottish rugby football player
- Saxon Rice (born 1976), Australian politician
- Saxon Sharbino (born 1999), American actress
- Saxon Sydney-Turner (1880-1962), member of the Bloomsbury Group
- Saxon White (born 1934), American medical researcher and academic and former rugby union player
