= Dresden White Diamond =

62-carat (12.4 g) cushion-cut diamond

Dresden White
- Weight: 62 carats (12.4 g)
- Color: D
- Type: IIa
- Cut: Cushion
- Country of origin: India
- Discovered: 17th –18th century

The Dresden White Diamond (also known as Dresden White or the Saxon White) is a 62-carat (12.4 g) cushion-cut diamond that probably originated from the Golconda mines in Southern India.

The Dresden White's name is derived from Dresden, the capital city of Saxony, Germany, and from the gem's white color.

== History ==
When the diamond was first shown to Frederick Augustus I, the King of Saxony, he was so captivated by the cut, clarity, and color of the gem that he chose to acquire it at any cost. He supposedly paid somewhere between $750,000 and $1,000,000 for the diamond.

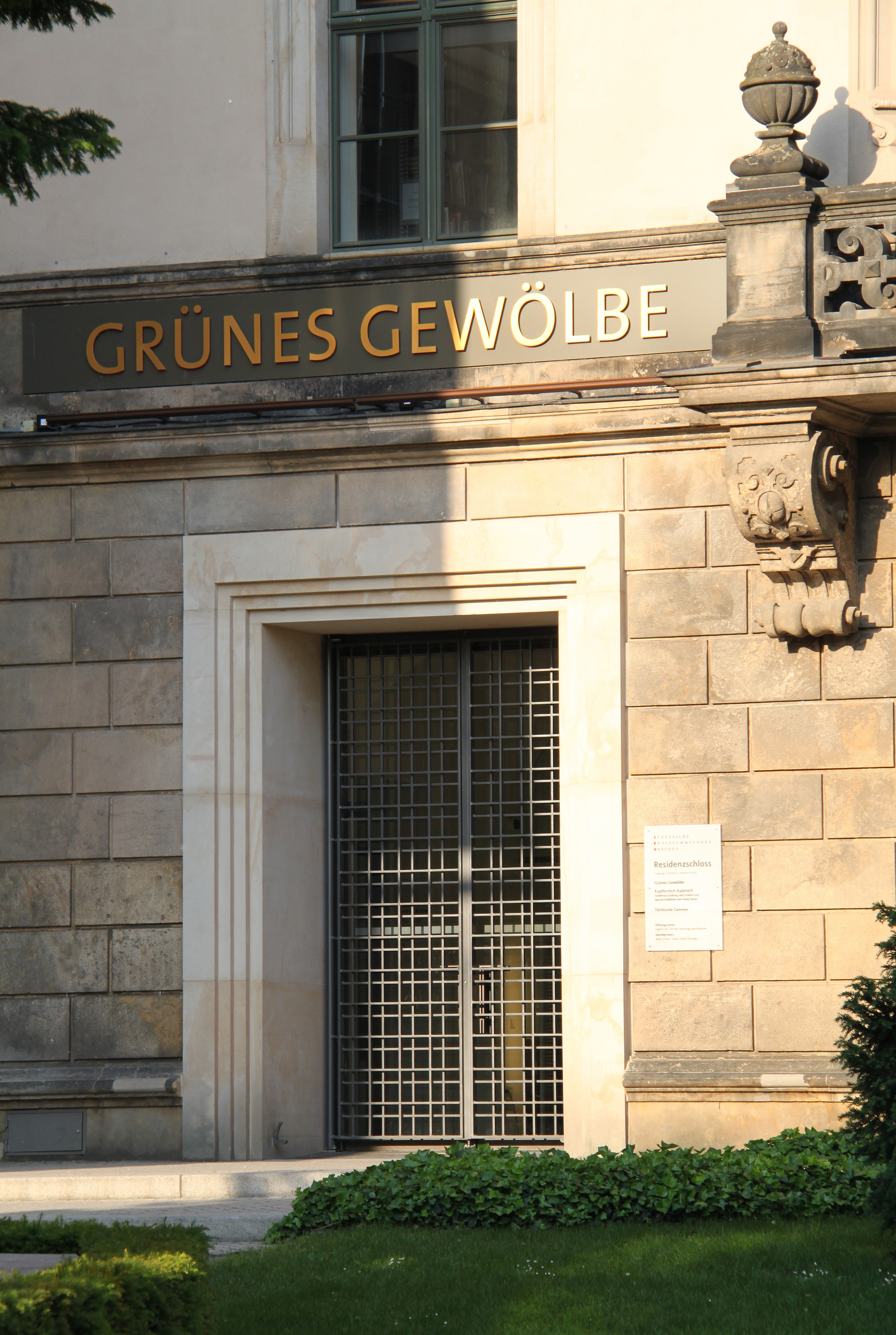
The Green Vault in 2012

In order to house his enormous collection of treasures, he set up the Green Vault in Dresden Castle.

In 1746, goldsmith Jean Jacques Pallard designed the elaborate Golden Fleece ornament for Frederick Augustus and the Dresden White was placed at the top of the design. However, after the end of the Seven Years' War the Golden Fleece was broken up. The Dresden White was then incorporated into a shoulder knot ornament designed around 19 large diamonds and 216 small stones.

After World War I, the items in the Green Vault were put on public display. They remained there until the beginning of World War II, when they were placed back under lock and key. At the height of the war in 1942, the items were transferred to the Königstein Fortress.

In 1945, the Soviet Trophies Commission took the Green Vault contents to Moscow, but safely returned them in 1958. The contents were then placed on display in Dresden's Albertinium, which was built on the same site as the original Dresden museum.

On November 25, 2019, a group of thieves stole much of the jewelry in the Green Vault during the 2019 Dresden heist, including the White Diamond.

On November 17, 2020, three people were arrested in Berlin in connection with the theft. The police operation of 1,638 officers focused their search mainly in Neukölln, southern Berlin.

== See also ==
- List of diamonds
