= Saxon Fairy Swallow pigeon =

Breed of pigeon

Saxon Fairy Swallow
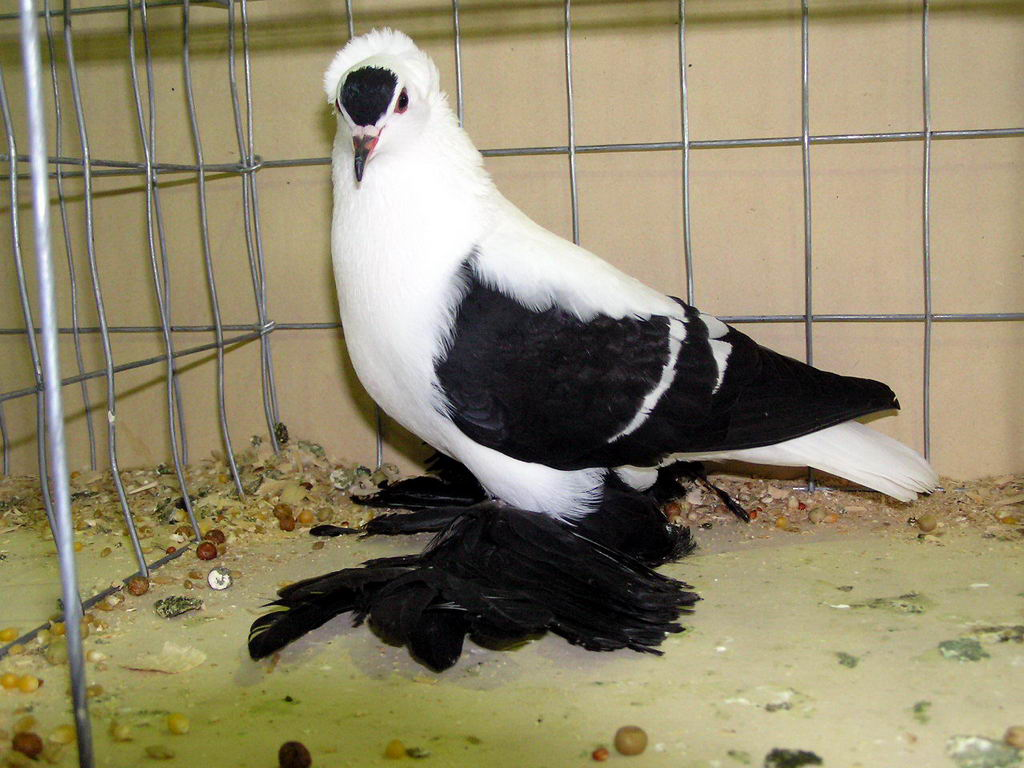
- Black
- Conservation status: Common
- Other names: Fairy Swallow
- Country of origin: Saxony
- Distribution: Europe, US, Australia
- Type: Show

Traits
- Weight: Male: 14 oz; Female: 13 oz
- Crest type: shell to fan shape
- Feather ornamentation: High luster, Foot feathering
- Color: black, blue, silver, red, yellow,
- Lifespan: 12 years
- markings: colored wings and spot on forehead
- Length: 14 inches
- eye color: bull

Classification
- Australian: Color breeds Group 2
- European: Color
- US: Color

The Saxon Fairy Swallow is a breed of fancy pigeon developed over many years of selective breeding. Saxon Fairy Swallows, along with other varieties of domesticated pigeons, are all descendants from the rock pigeon (Columba livia). The Saxon Swallows and Wing Pigeons have various markings and patterns (spot marking, cap marking etc.).

Saxon Fairy Swallow pigeons are well known for the odd feathered feet, as seen in the images.

== Gallery ==
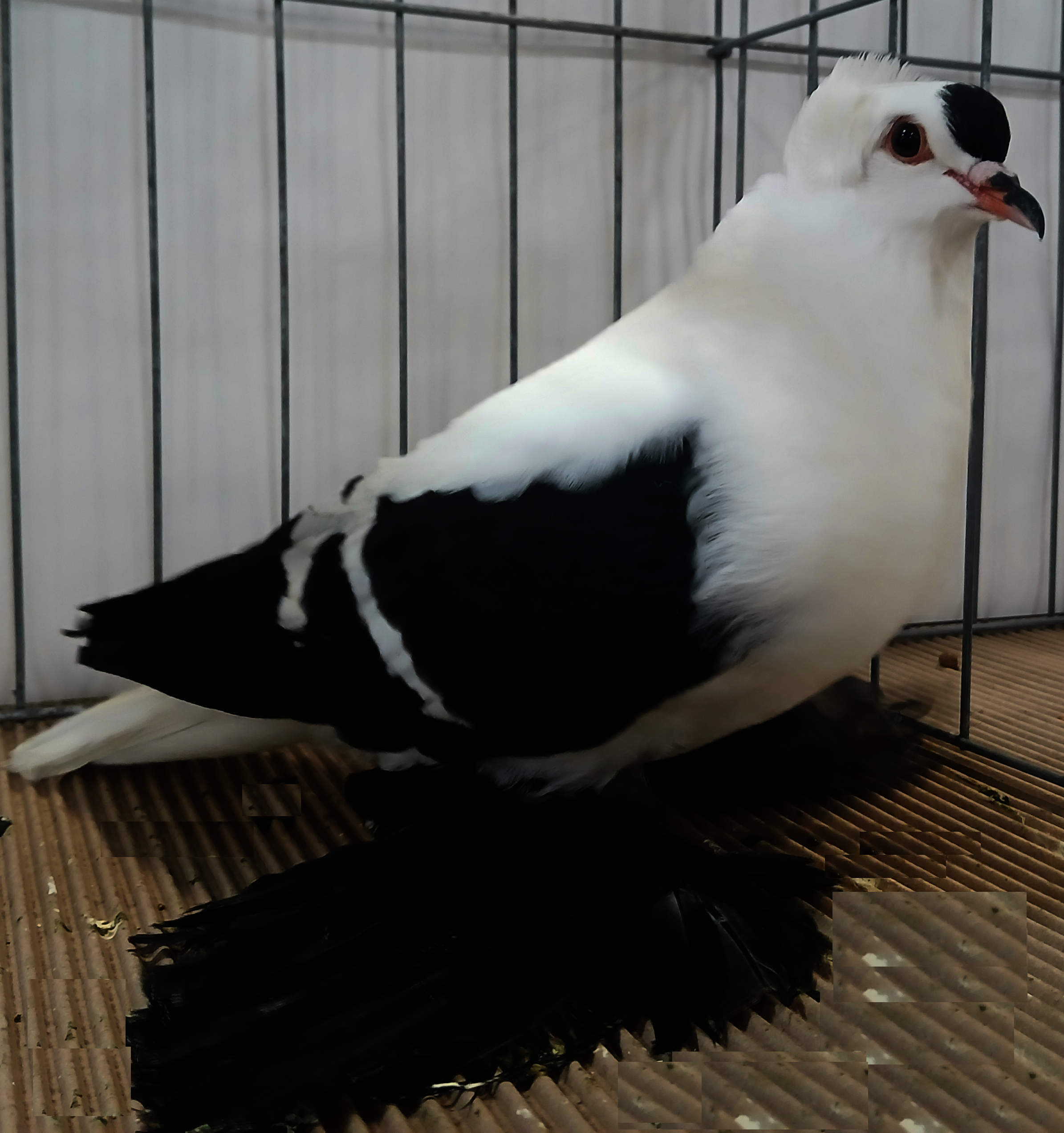
Black

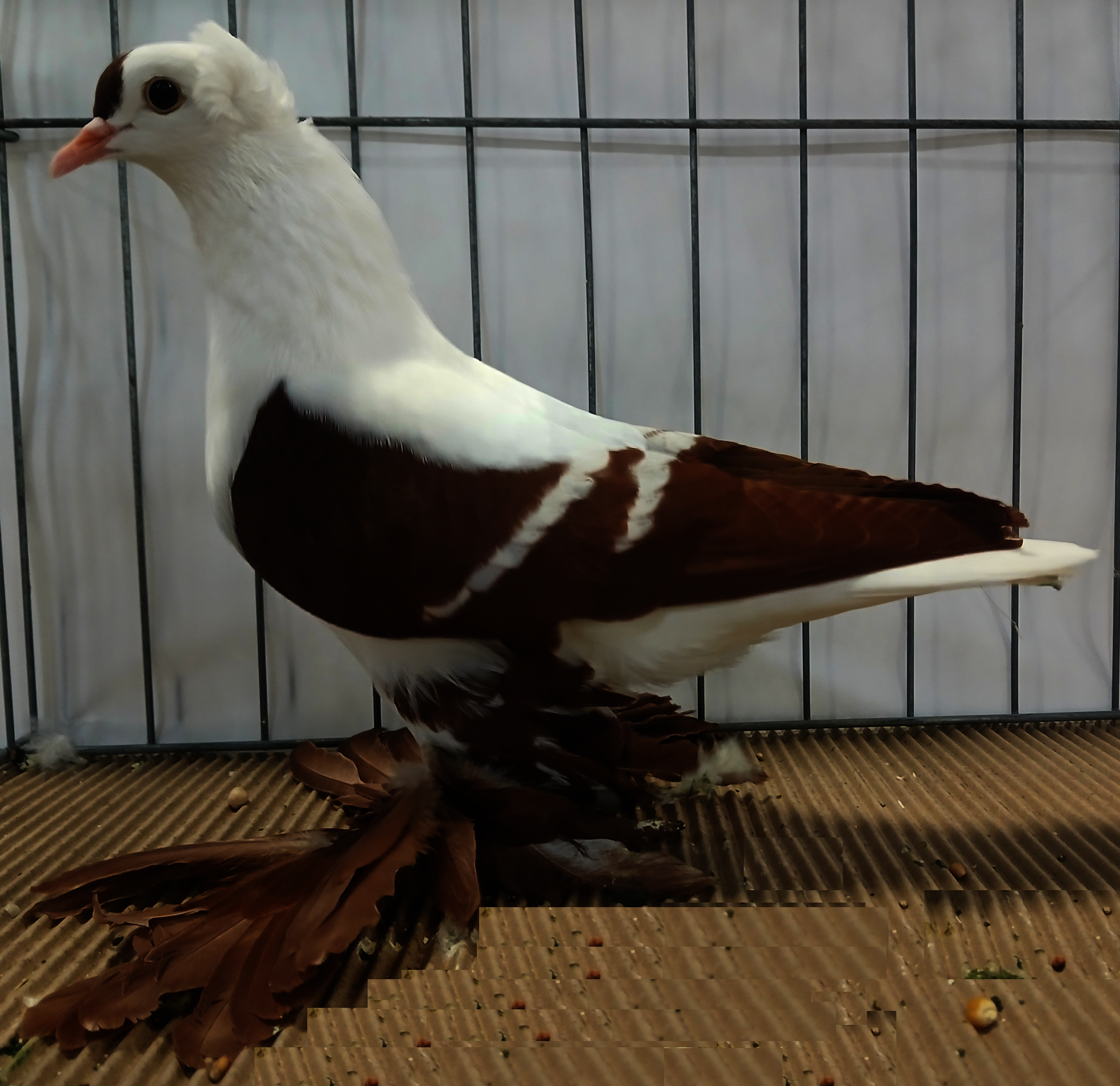
Red

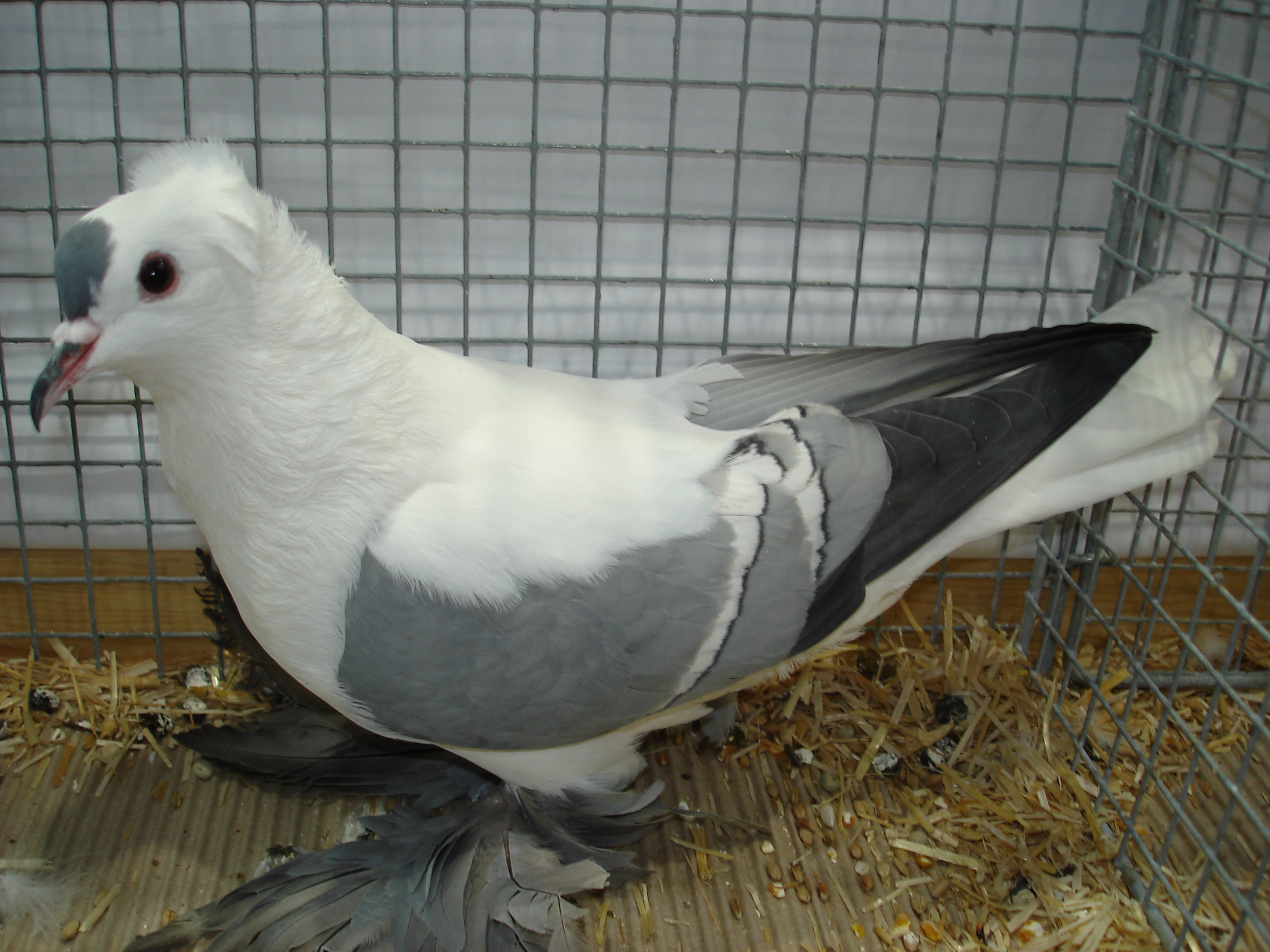
Saksońska czajka Blue

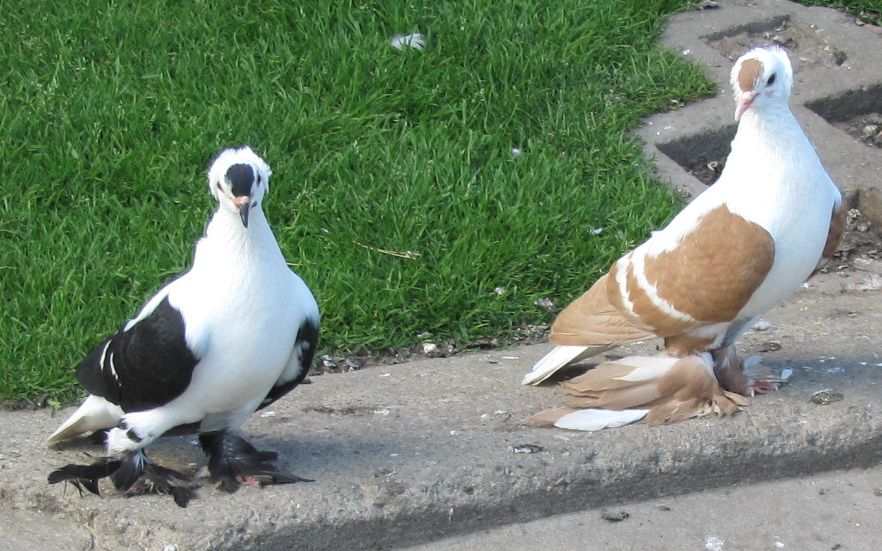
Saksonska czajka Black and Yellow

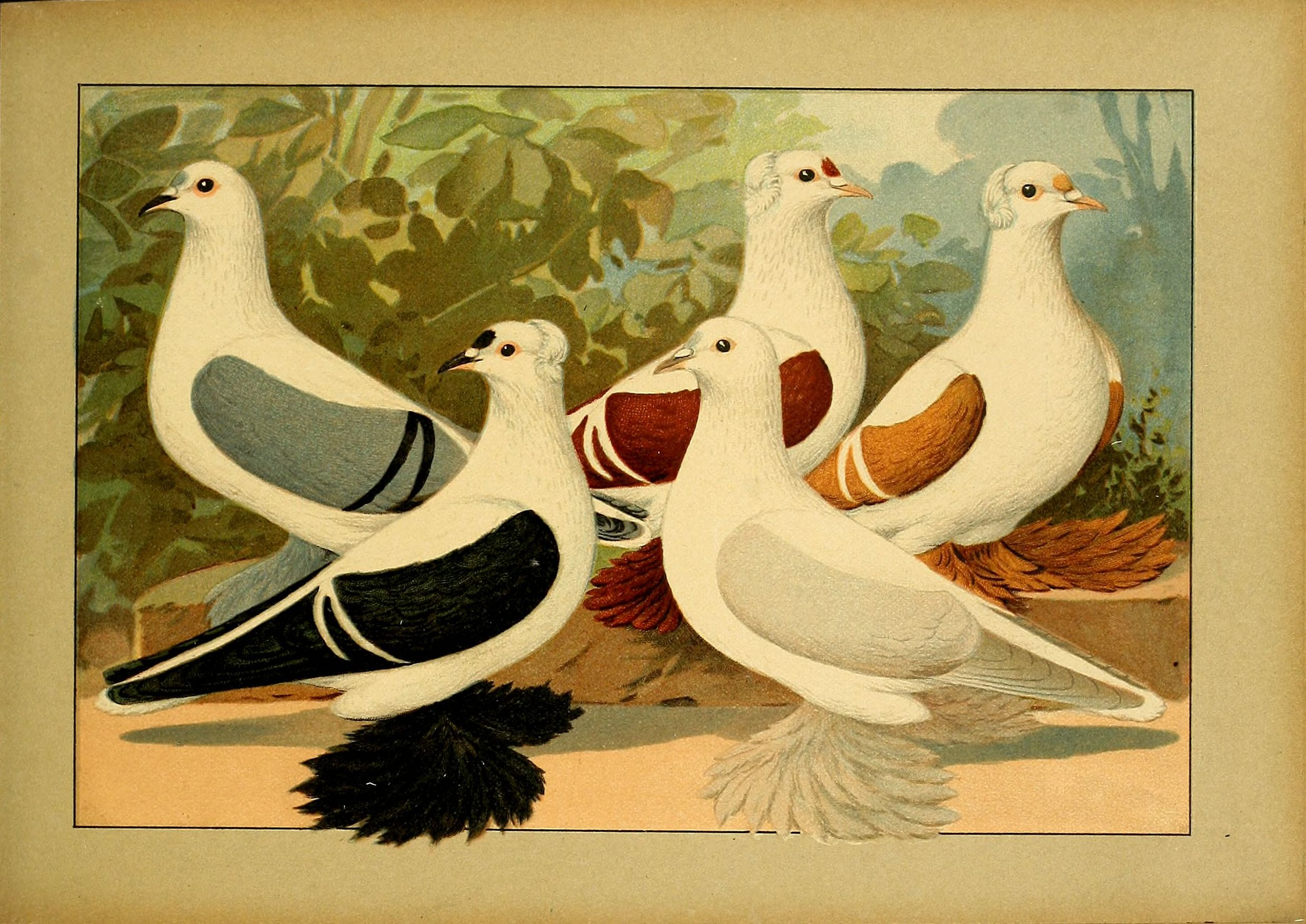
Schachtzabel 1906 Tafel 40

== See also ==
- Pigeon Diet
- Pigeon Housing
- List of pigeon breeds
