= RMS Saxonia =

RMS Saxonia may refer to the former Royal Mail Ships:

- RMS Saxonia (1899), a British Cunard Line passenger ship launched in 1899 and scrapped in 1925
- RMS Saxon (1900), was a Royal Mail Ship of the British Cunard Line launched in 1900 for the passenger and mail run between Southampton, England and Cape Town, South Africa. She was scrapped in 1932. She was the fourth ship by this name.
- RMS Saxonia (1954), a British Cunard Line passenger ship launched in 1954 and renamed RMS Carmania in 1962, sold to a Soviet shipping company and renamed SS Leonid Sobinov in 1973, and scrapped in 1999
