= Saxon, West Virginia =

- Unincorporated community
- Location within West Virginia Location within the United States
- Coordinates: 37°47′53″N 81°24′53″W
- Country: United States
- State: West Virginia
- County: Raleigh
- Elevation: 1,752 ft (534 m)
- Time zone: UTC-5 (Eastern (EST))
  - Summer (DST): UTC-4 (EDT)
- ZIP code: 25180
- Area codes: 304 & 681
- GNIS feature ID: 1555578

Saxon is an unincorporated community in Raleigh County, West Virginia, United States. Saxon is 12.5 miles (20.1 km) west of Beckley. Saxon had a post office, which closed on June 27, 2009.
