= Saxon Spot =

Breed of pigeon

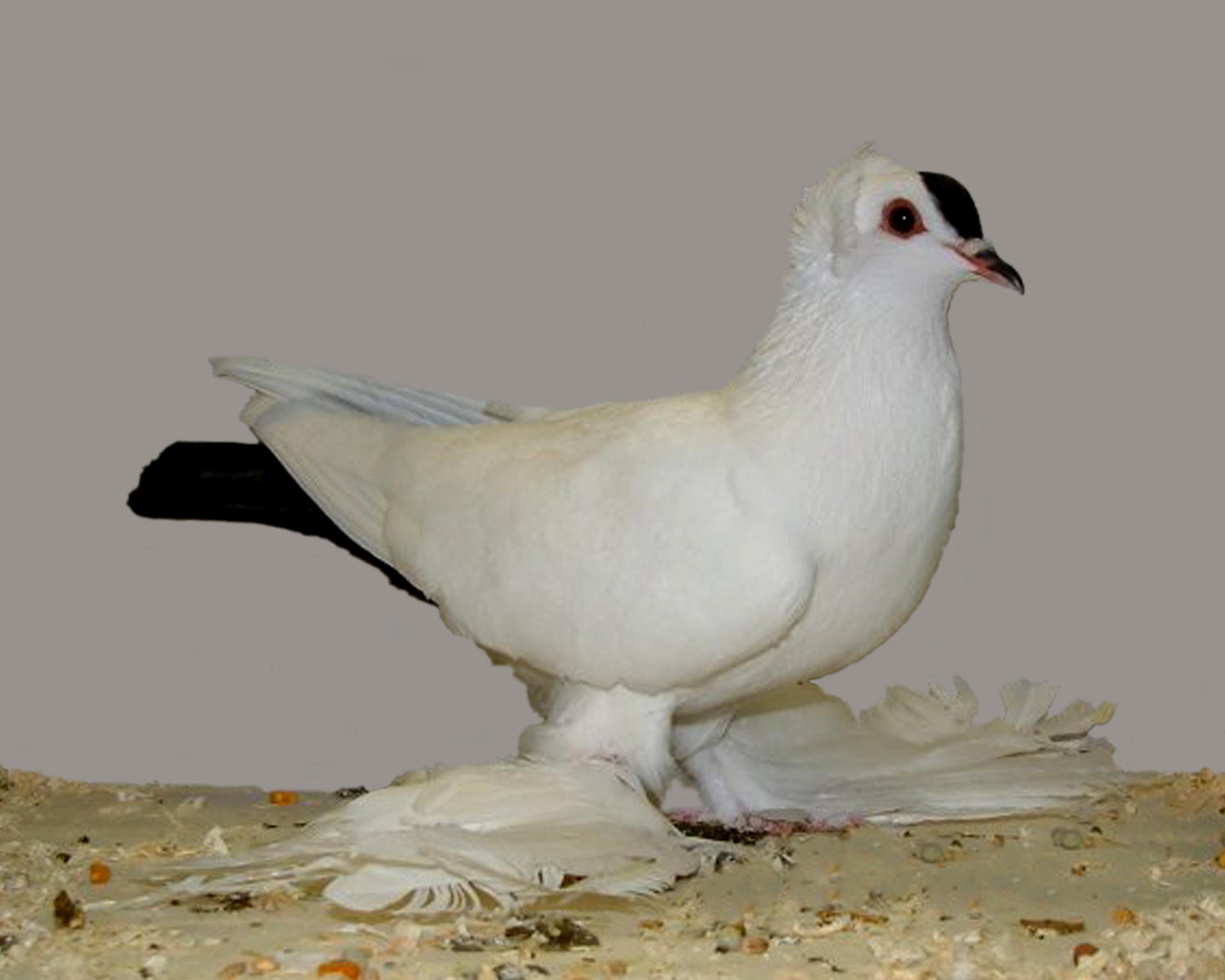
- Black Spot Pigeon
- Conservation status: Rare
- Other names: snip
- Country of origin: Germany

Traits
- Crest type: shell
- Feather ornamentation: foot feathering

Classification
- US Breed Group: Fancy
- EE Breed Group: Tumbler and Highflyer

The Saxon Spot (German: Sächsische Schnippe) is a breed of fancy pigeon. Saxon Spots, along with other varieties of domesticated pigeons, are all descendants of the rock dove (Columba livia). It is one of the oldest of the Toy breeds, already known in Southern Germany in 1735

== Appearance ==
The Saxon Spot comes in four color varieties: black, blue, red and yellow. The signature characteristic of the breed is a coloured spot on the top of their head. Their neck is short and their beak is long, with the upper beak being dark blue. The Saxon Spot's feet are well muffed. Their back is broad and their wings rest on the top of the birds tail

== Origin ==
The Saxon Spot originated in Saxony.

== See also ==
- List of pigeon breeds
- Saxon Shield
- Saxon Monk
- https://commons.wikimedia.org/wiki/File:American_Pigeon_Journal_1951_03.pdf
