= Saxon Monk =

Breed of pigeon

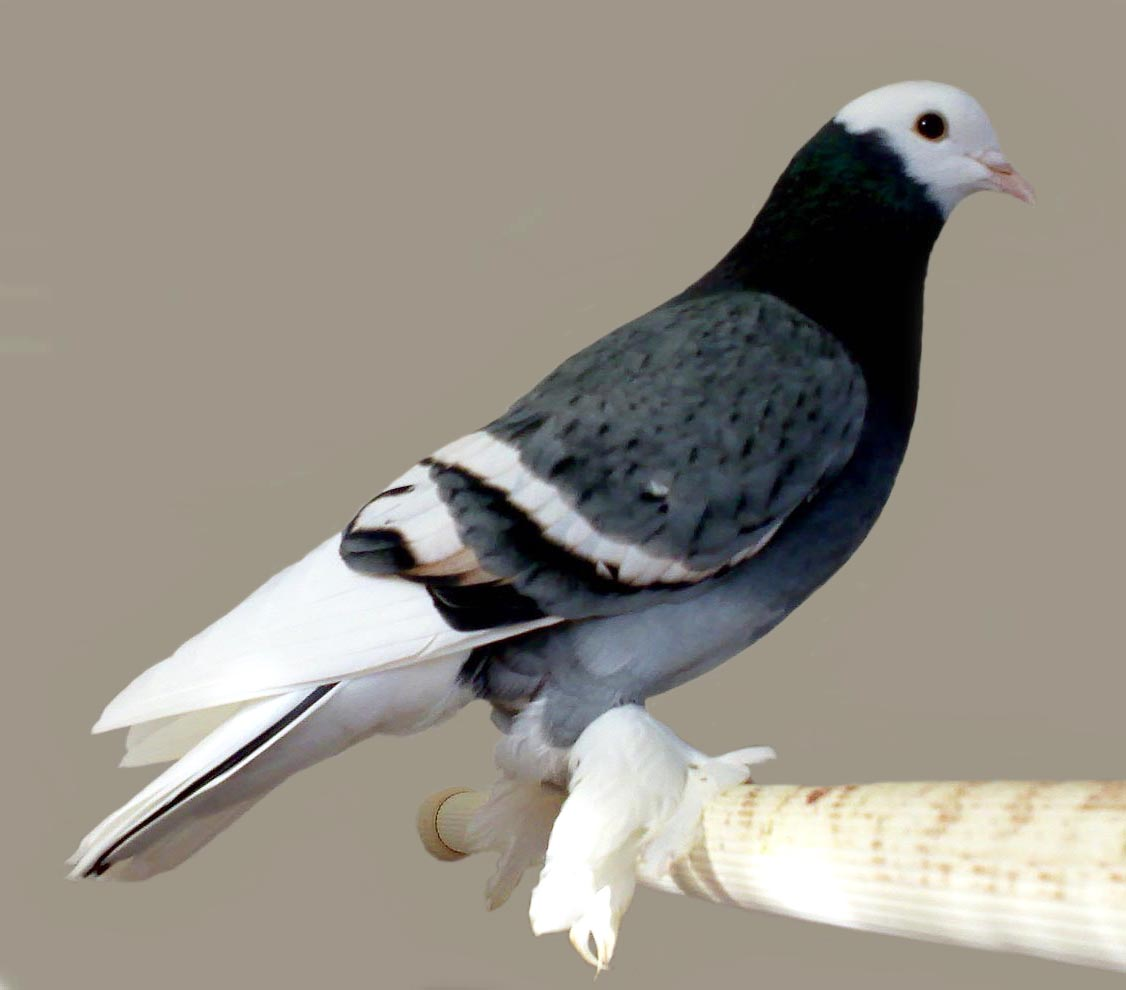
Saxon Monk, (blue-laced barred)

The Saxon Monk is a breed of fancy pigeon. Saxon Monks, along with other varieties of domesticated pigeons, are all descendants from the rock pigeon (Columba livia).

== Appearance ==
The Saxon Monk comes in five colors including blue, black, purple, red, yellow and silver with white bars or spangles with pink wings

== See also ==
- List of pigeon breeds
- Saxon Shield
- Saxon Spot
