= Saxon Colour pigeons =

Group of pigeon breeds

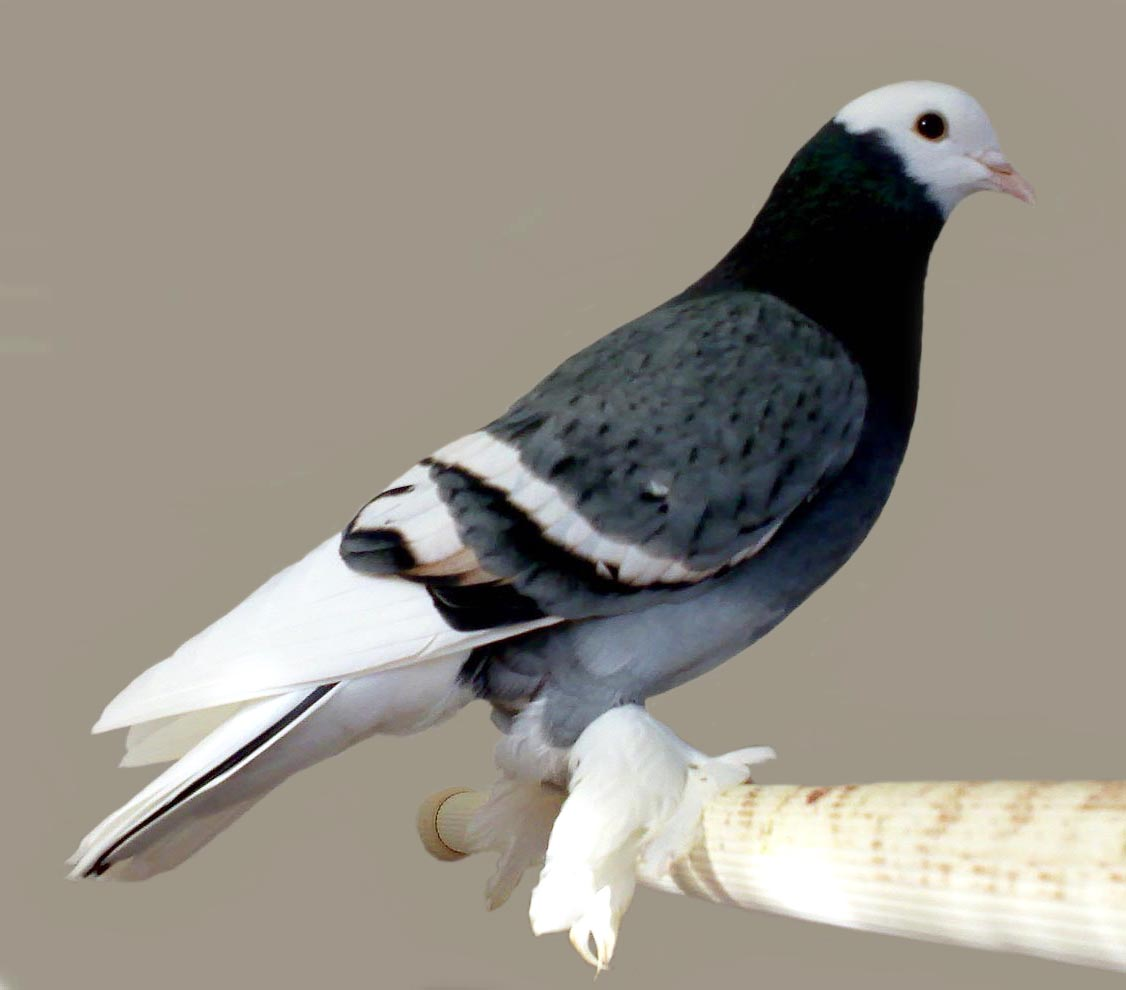
Saxon Monk

The Saxon Colour pigeons are a group of Saxon breeds of fancy pigeons developed over many years of selective breeding. Saxon Colour pigeons, along with other varieties of domesticated pigeons, are all descendants from the rock pigeon (Columba livia). Saxon Colour pigeons are a combination of various varieties which are basically the same type differing only in colour and markings. Some varieties include: Saxon Breast pigeon, Saxon Monk (pictured), Saxon Priest, Saxon Reversewing, Saxon Shield, Saxon Spot and Saxon Whitetail. Saxon Colour pigeons have similar colour varieties to the Thuringian Colour pigeons but the Saxons are all Muff (feathered) legged.

== See also ==
- List of pigeon breeds
