= Saxon Shield =

Breed of pigeon

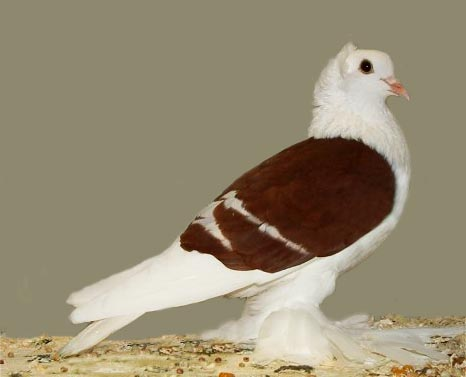
- A Saxon Shield
- Conservation status: Common
- Country of origin: Germany

Classification

The Saxon Shield is a breed of fancy pigeon. Saxon Shields, along with other varieties of domesticated pigeons, are all descendants from the rock pigeon (Columba livia).

== Appearance ==
The Saxon Shield comes in many colors including black, blue, red and yellow with white bars or spangles, blue with black bars or barless, blue check or silver check.

== Origin ==
The Saxon Shield originated in Saxony.

== See also ==
- List of pigeon breeds
- Saxon Spot
- Saxon Monk
