= Saxony (group) =

Australian pop rock band

- Origin: Australia
- Genres: Pop rock
- Years active: 1975–1976
- Labels: Chicago Records
- Past members: Col Chammings; Nicky Saxon

Saxony were a short lived Australian pop rock band formed in Adelaide, South Australia in 1975. The group released two singles, both of which peaked inside the Australian top 100.

== Discography ==
=== Singles ===
List of singles, with Australian chart positions
| Year | Title | Peak chart positions |
| Year | Title | AUS |
|---|---|---|
| 1975 | "Smokey" | 56 |
| 1975 | "A World of Illusion" | 100 |
