= Green Vault =

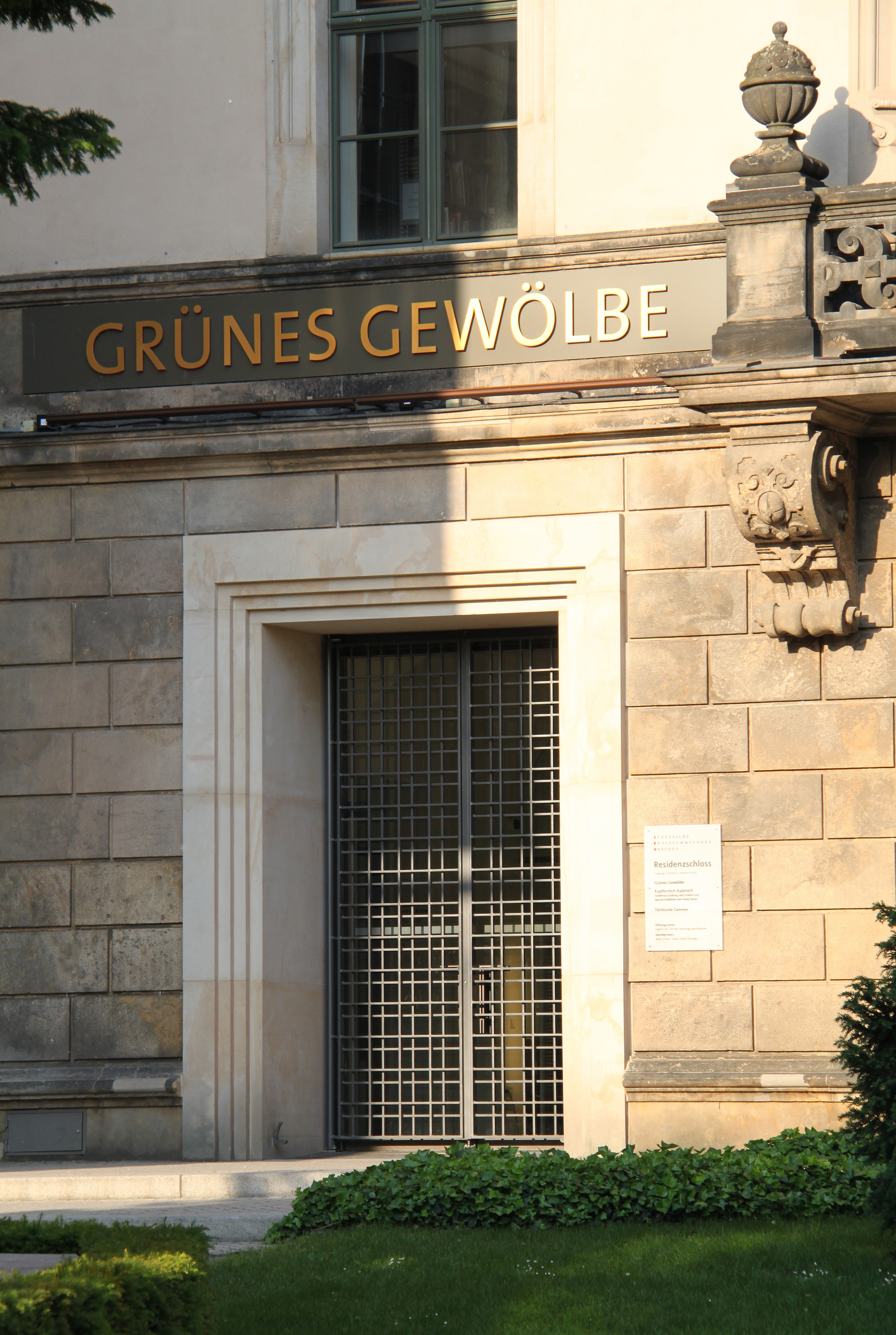
- Grünes Gewölbe (Green Vault)
- Interactive fullscreen map
- Established: 1723; 303 years ago
- Location: Dresden, Germany
- Coordinates: 51°03′10″N 13°44′11″E
- Type: Art museum
- Website: https://gruenes-gewoelbe.skd.museum/

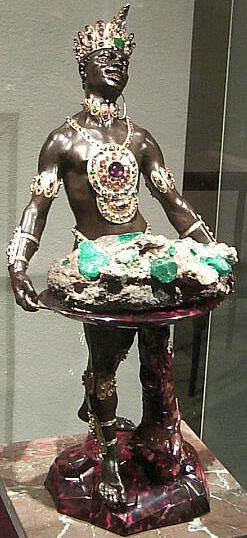
Moor with Emerald Cluster

The Green Vault (German: Grünes Gewölbe; pronounced [ˈɡʁyːnəs ɡəˈʋœlbə]) is a museum located in Dresden, Germany, which contains the largest treasure collection in Europe. The museum was founded in 1723 by Augustus the Strong of Poland and Saxony, and features a variety of exhibits in styles from Baroque to Classicism. The Green Vault is named after the formerly malachite green-painted column bases and capitals of the initial rooms. It is one of the oldest museums in the world; it is older than the British Museum, opened in 1759, but the Kunstkamera in St. Petersburg, Russia was opened in 1714 and the Vatican Museums date their foundation to the public display of the newly excavated Laocoön group in 1506.

After the bombing of Dresden during World War II, the Green Vault was completely restored. Today, its treasures are shown in two exhibitions: The Historic Green Vault (Historisches Grünes Gewölbe) is famous for its splendors of the historic treasure chamber as it existed in 1733, while the New Green Vault (Neues Grünes Gewölbe) focuses the attention on each individual object in neutral rooms.

The Green Vault is located on the first and second floors of the western section of Dresden Castle. It is now part of the Dresden State Art Collections.

== History ==
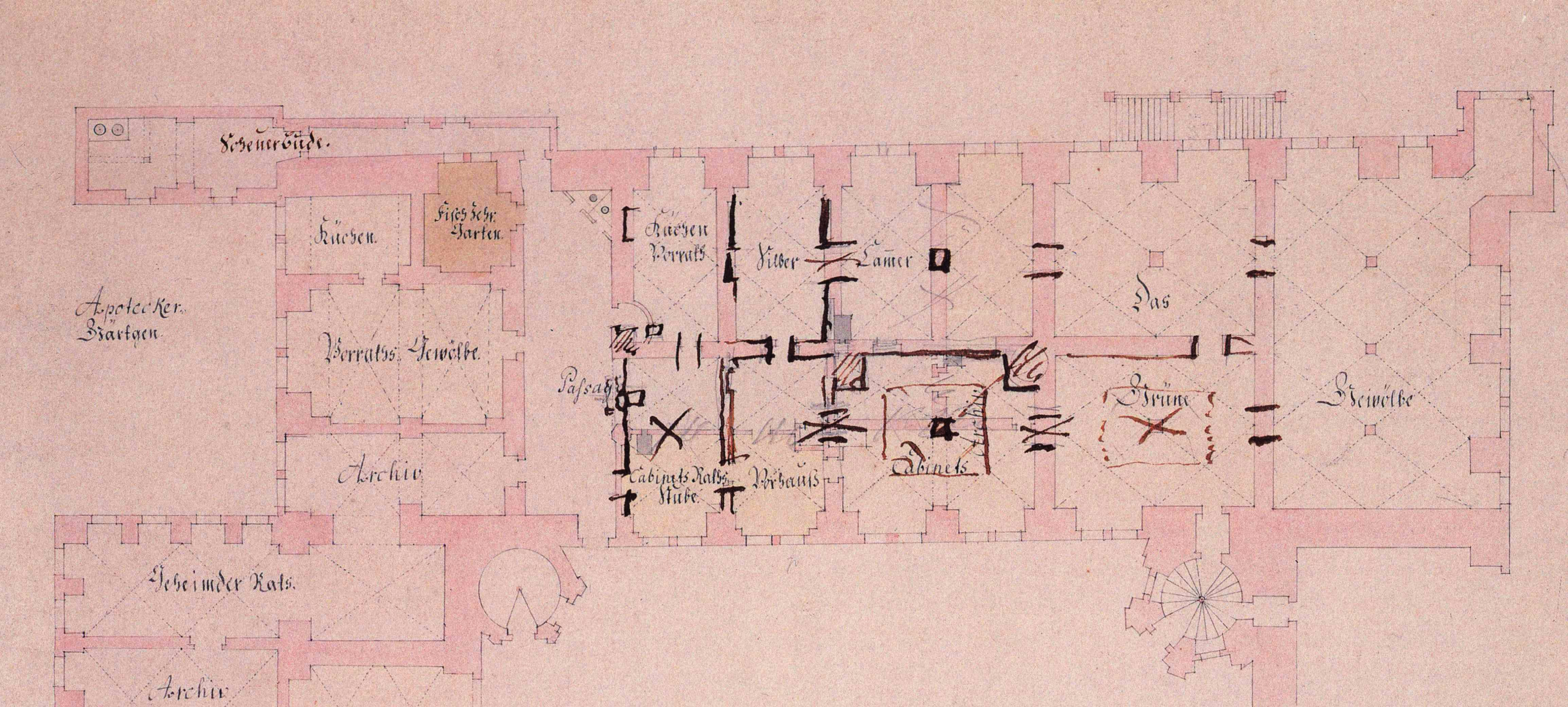
Ground plan from 1727 with handwritten notes by Augustus the Strong marking his intentions

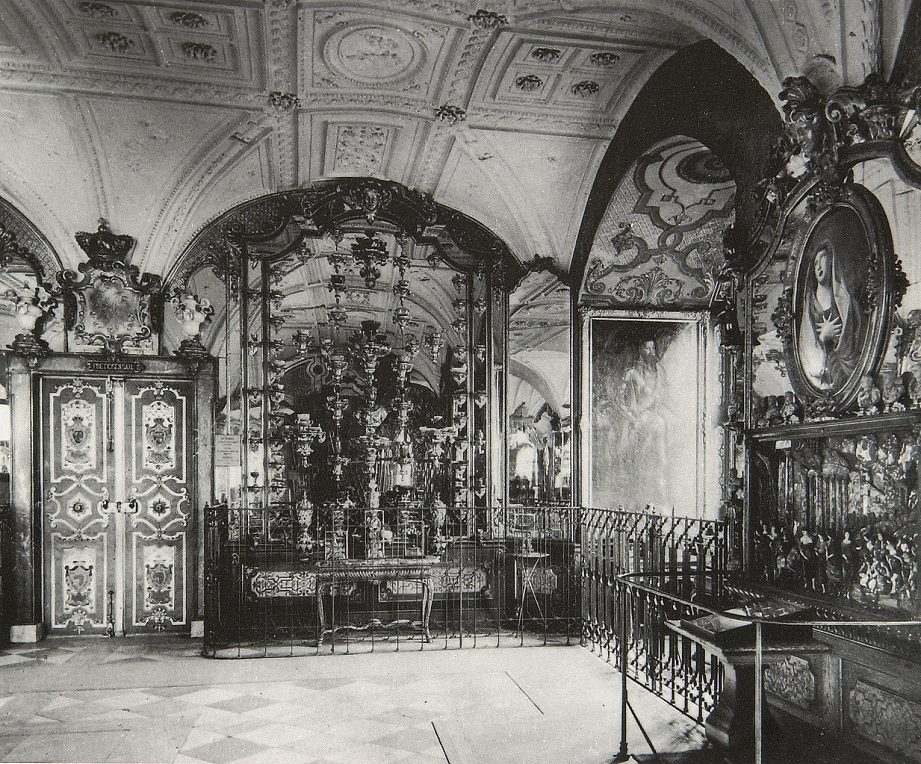
Juwelenzimmer in 1904 (destroyed 1945)

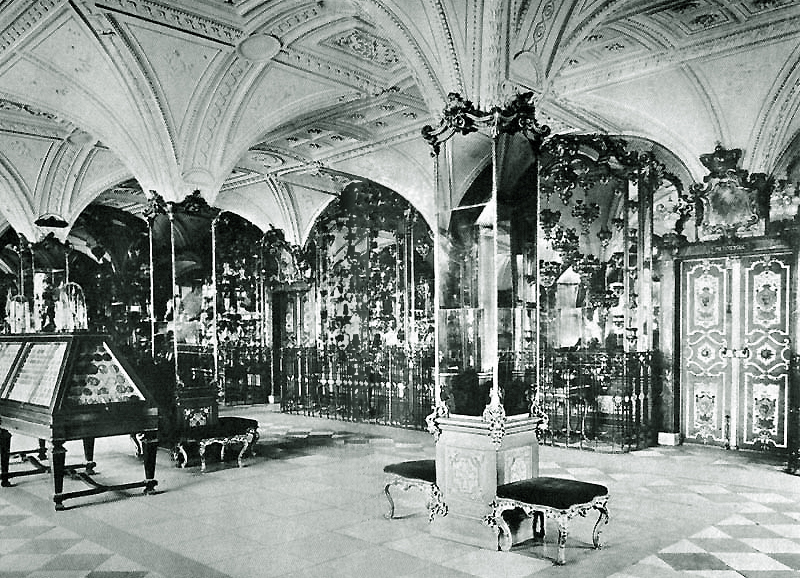
Pretiosensaal in 1904

=== Monarchial period ===
In 1547, Holy Roman elector Moritz of Saxony ordered the construction of an additional wing to Dresden Castle. Four of the added rooms on the first floor of the palace were given elaborate, molded plaster ceilings. In these rooms, the column bases and capitals were painted a bluish-green color. Due to this coloring, the rooms were referred to as the "Green Vault." The official name of these rooms, which were protected against fire and robbery by thick walls and iron shutters and doors, was "Privy Repository" (Geheime Verwahrung).

Throughout the 17th century, the Privy Repository was used by the rulers of the Electorate of Saxony as a private treasure chamber for important documents and jewelry. Then, between 1723 and 1729, the elector Frederic Augustus I, today referred to as Augustus the Strong, turned the private chambers into a public museum. First, he commanded splendid rooms to be created in which to display his collection. The Pretiosensaal (Hall of Treasures) and the Eckkabinett (Corner Cabinet) were listed as completed in the inventory of 1725; they reached their present-day form in this construction phase. An extension followed in 1727. Augustus’ intentions have been preserved on a ground plan from 1727 on which he drew his ideas. As in the first construction phase, the architect Matthäus Daniel Pöppelmann planned and built a museum-like, artistic structure of German Baroque grandeur. A suite of eight interconnecting rooms was constructed whose architectural beauty complemented the abundance and quality of the priceless treasures. Augustus the Strong could now exhibit his entire collection of valuables, including bronze statues and works of art in silver, gold, amber and ivory. The sequence of rooms was deliberately staged, presenting the objects according to their materials. By the end of his almost four-decade-long reign in 1733, Augustus the Strong had made his crown treasures and his inherited riches accessible to the public – an unprecedented innovation in the Baroque period.

=== 20th century ===
These rooms remained unchanged for almost two centuries. When war was imminent in 1938, the art treasures were taken to the Königstein Fortress.

The Green Vault was severely damaged in the February 13, 1945 bombing of Dresden in World War II. Three of the eight rooms were totally destroyed. At the end of the war in 1945, the treasures were confiscated by the Red Army and transported to the Soviet Union. After their return to Dresden in 1958, part of the collection was displayed at the Albertinum.

=== 21st century ===
In 2004, the New Green Vault was opened on the second floor of the rebuilt Dresden castle. Its modern style of presentation centers on the works of art. In 2006, the reconstructed Historic Green Vault was reopened in the magnificent suite of rooms on the first floor as it had existed in 1733 at the time of its founder's death.

On 25 November 2019, the Green Vault was broken into, and three sets of early 18th century royal jewellery were stolen. Each set consists of 37 items, made up of diamonds, rubies, emeralds, and sapphires. It was estimated that the stolen items were worth up to 1 billion euros (US$1.1 billion).

In December 2022, investigators found 31 objects stolen in the 2019 burglary, reportedly after talks with the lawyers of six men on trial for the theft.

In May 2023, five men were found guilty of the heist. The robbers were a part of the Remmo clan, a criminal clan that is involved in organised crime and conducted raids on a department store and a bank robbery. One of the thieves was also involved in the theft of a gold coin from the Bode museum in Berlin.

== Collection ==
Prior to the 2019 heist, the collection consisted of over 4,000 pieces, with almost 1,100 on display in the New Green Vault and about 3,000 shown in the Historic Green Vault.

Entrance to the Historic Green Vault requires advance purchase of tickets for a specific entry time slot. A limited number of tickets is also sold every morning. The New Green Vault can be visited at any time.

=== Historic Green Vault ===
The Historic Green Vault has approximately 3,000 pieces of jewelry on display, including works in gold, amber, and ivory. Gemstone vessels and bronze statuettes are on display without showcases, in front of mirrored display walls. The Historic Green Vault is located on the first floor of Dresden Castle, and spans roughly 2,000 square metres.

With these treasure chambers, Augustus the Strong realised his vision of a Baroque Gesamtkunstwerk (synthesis of the arts) as an expression of wealth and absolutist power. He presented his treasures to a select public, thus establishing the Green Vault as one of Europe's oldest museums.

==== Exhibition rooms ====
Structure of the Historic Green Vault

The Historic Green Vault consists of nine rooms and one entrance chamber:

1. The Vorgewölbe (Entrance Chamber, Foyer): a collection of Schatzkunst (artworks using precious materials) of the Middle Ages and early Renaissance; enamel works from Limoges; artifacts used by Martin Luther; and photographs depicting the pre-war condition of the Green Vault.
2. The Bernsteinkabinett (Amber Cabinet): artworks made of amber.
3. The Elfenbeinzimmer (Ivory Room): great variety of carved art pieces and small statues, all made from real ivory.
4. The Weißsilberzimmer (Silver Room or White Silver Room): silver artworks, including silver table service of Augustus the Strong.
5. The Silbervergoldete Zimmer (Silver Gilt Room): gilded silver as well as gold drinking vessels and works of art.
6. The Pretiosensaal (Pretiosa Room or Hall of Treasures): largest room, completely mirrored; most of the mirrors are silvered with mercury. Contains vessels made of colored gems and amber, mussels and ostrich eggs. Also on display is a collection of artworks made from rock crystal.
7. The Wappenzimmer (Coats of Arms Room, Heraldry Room): copper and gilded coats of arms of the Saxon provinces, the Polish state coat of arms and the initial plates of the House of Wettin electorates.
8. The Juwelenzimmer (Jewel Chamber): crown jewels of the Saxon-Polish royalty and rings, chains, medallions and gems. Includes the statues "Moor with Emerald Cluster", "Jewel Garniture" and "Obeliscus Augustalis".
9. The Bronzezimmer (Bronze Room): so named for the numerous Renaissance bronze statues as well as for contemporary bronze figures and figure groups.
10. The Raum der Renaissancebronzen (Room of Renaissance Bronzes).

==== Selected exhibits ====
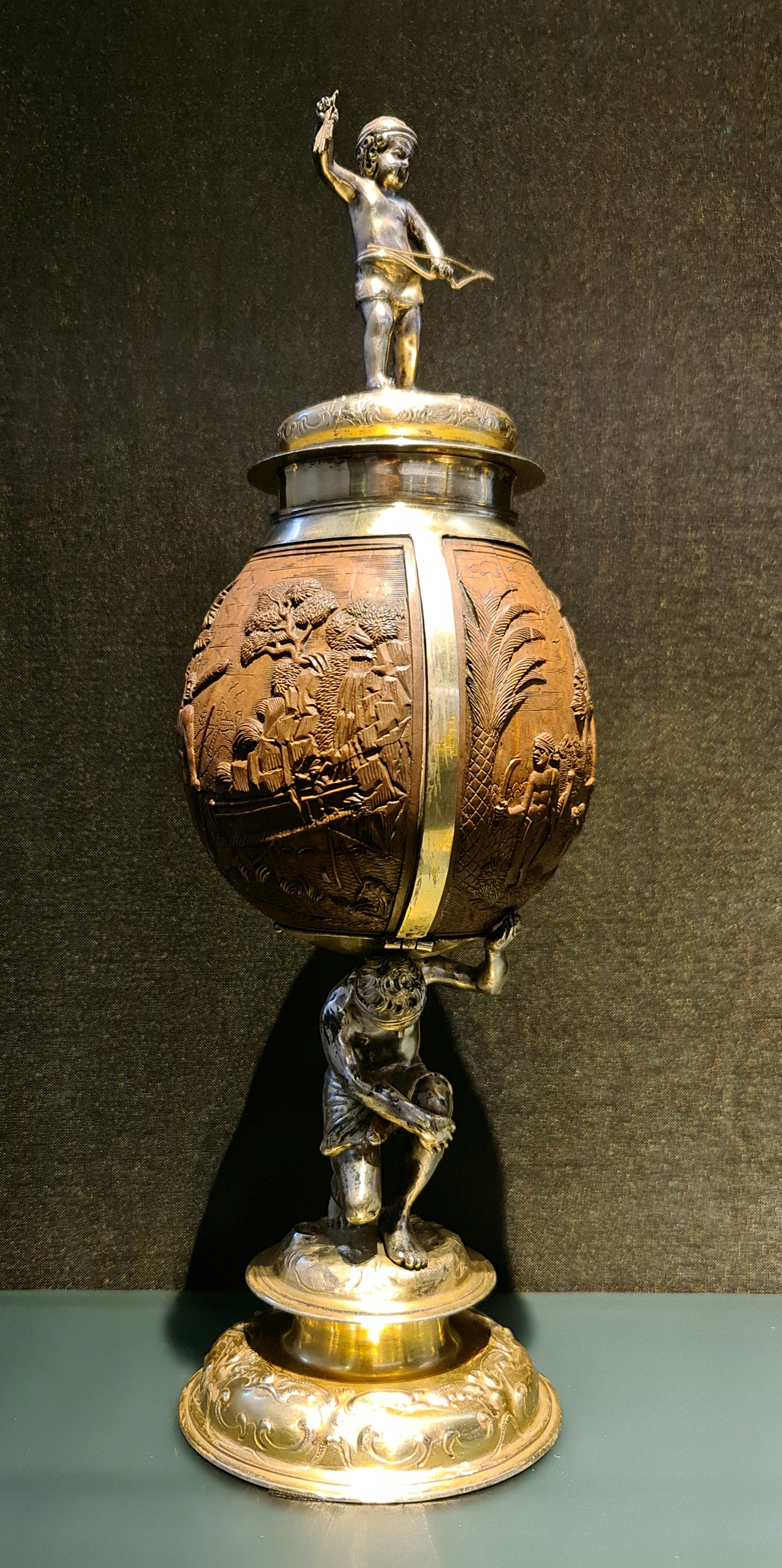
Coconut cup carved with Brazilian scenes, c. 1656, Neues Grünes Gewölbe

One of the most important statues in the collection is the "Moor with Emerald Cluster" (Mohr mit Smaragdstufe; also known as "Moor with Emerald Plate" or "Moor with Platter of Emeralds"). It was manufactured by the royal goldsmith Johann Melchior Dinglinger together with Balthasar Permoser, probably in 1724. The statue is 63.8 centimetres (2.09 feet) high and richly decorated with jewels. It was created because Augustus the Strong wanted to exhibit a precious emerald cluster, studded with 16 dark green emeralds, in his new Schatzkammer museum. The emerald cluster, a "miracle of nature" which originally came from a Colombian mine, was given to Elector Augustus by Emperor Rudolf II as a gift in 1581. The "moor" is actually an elegantly dressed South American Indian, who presents the Colombian emerald cluster on a tray of tortoiseshell.

The Jewel Garnitures (Juwelen-Garnituren) constitute the largest collection of jewels in Europe. They represented the monarchs' claim of absolute power. Here, the "Dresden White" or "Saxon White" (Sächsische Weiße), a 49.71-carat (9.942 g) carat cushion-shaped diamond, is on display. Also unique is a 648-carat (129.6 g) sapphire, a present from czar Peter I of Russia.

Three of the Jewel Garnitures were removed during a robbery on 25 November 2019. So far they have yet to be recovered.

The jewel-studded obelisk Obeliscus Augustalis was made by Johann Melchior Dinglinger in 1719–21. The 2.28 metres (7.5 feet) high obelisk with 240 stones and figures was acquired by Augustus the Strong directly from Dinglinger's workshop. This cabinet piece, conceived as an indoor monument, shows a portrait of Augustus the Strong at the centre of the monument. He is presented as a king revered by peoples from classical antiquity, as becomes obvious by the cameos of famous men and women from this classical period skillfully carved on the shaft of the obelisk.

=== New Green Vault ===
The New Green Vault contains works of the royal goldsmith Johann Melchior Dinglinger and other jewelry from the Baroque era. In total, there are roughly 1,100 pieces on display in the New Green Vault. The New Green Vault is located on the second floor of the castle, and is roughly the same size as the Historic vault, at approximately 2,000 square metres.

==== Exhibition rooms ====
Structure of the New Green Vault

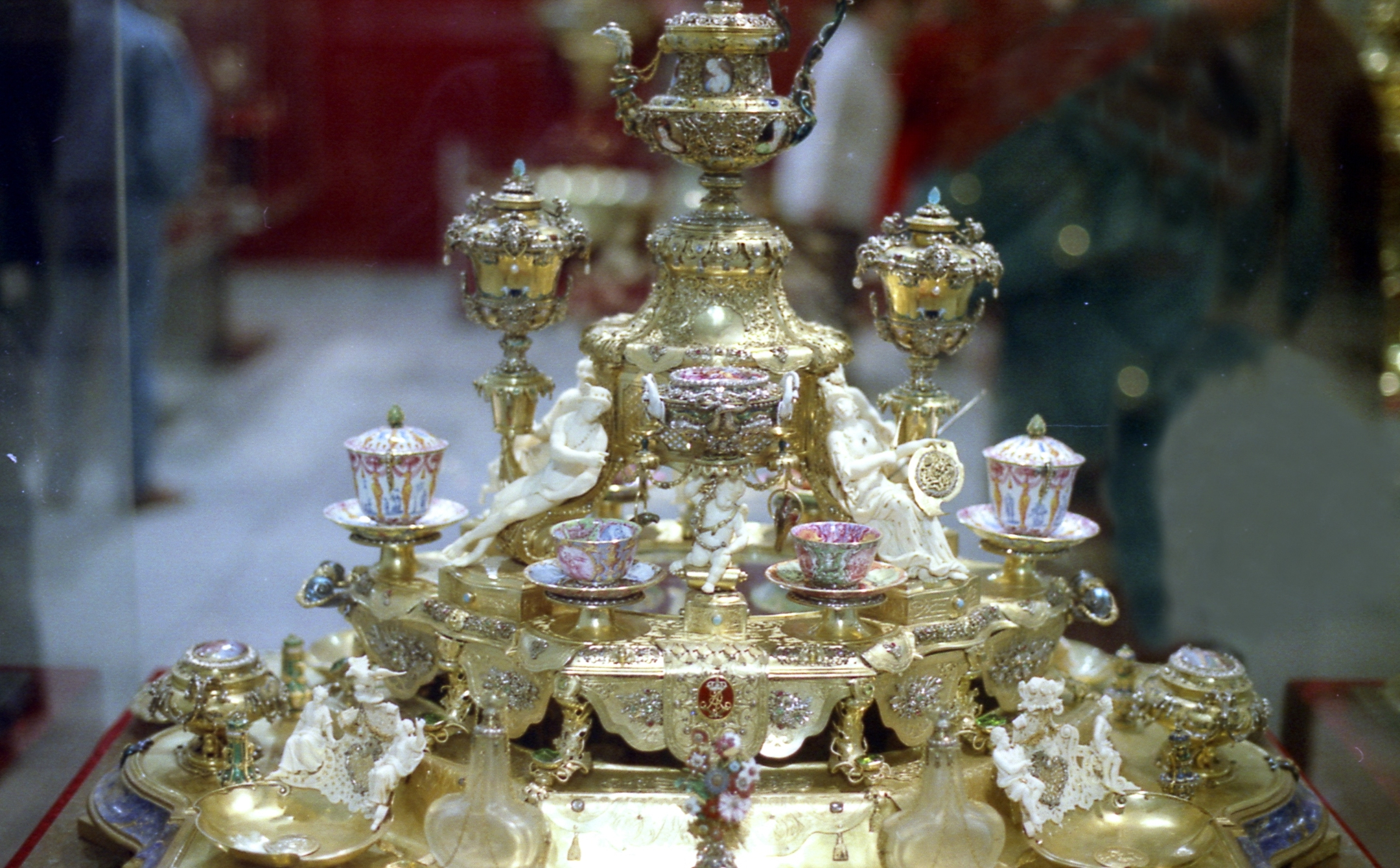
Golden Coffee Service (1697–1701)

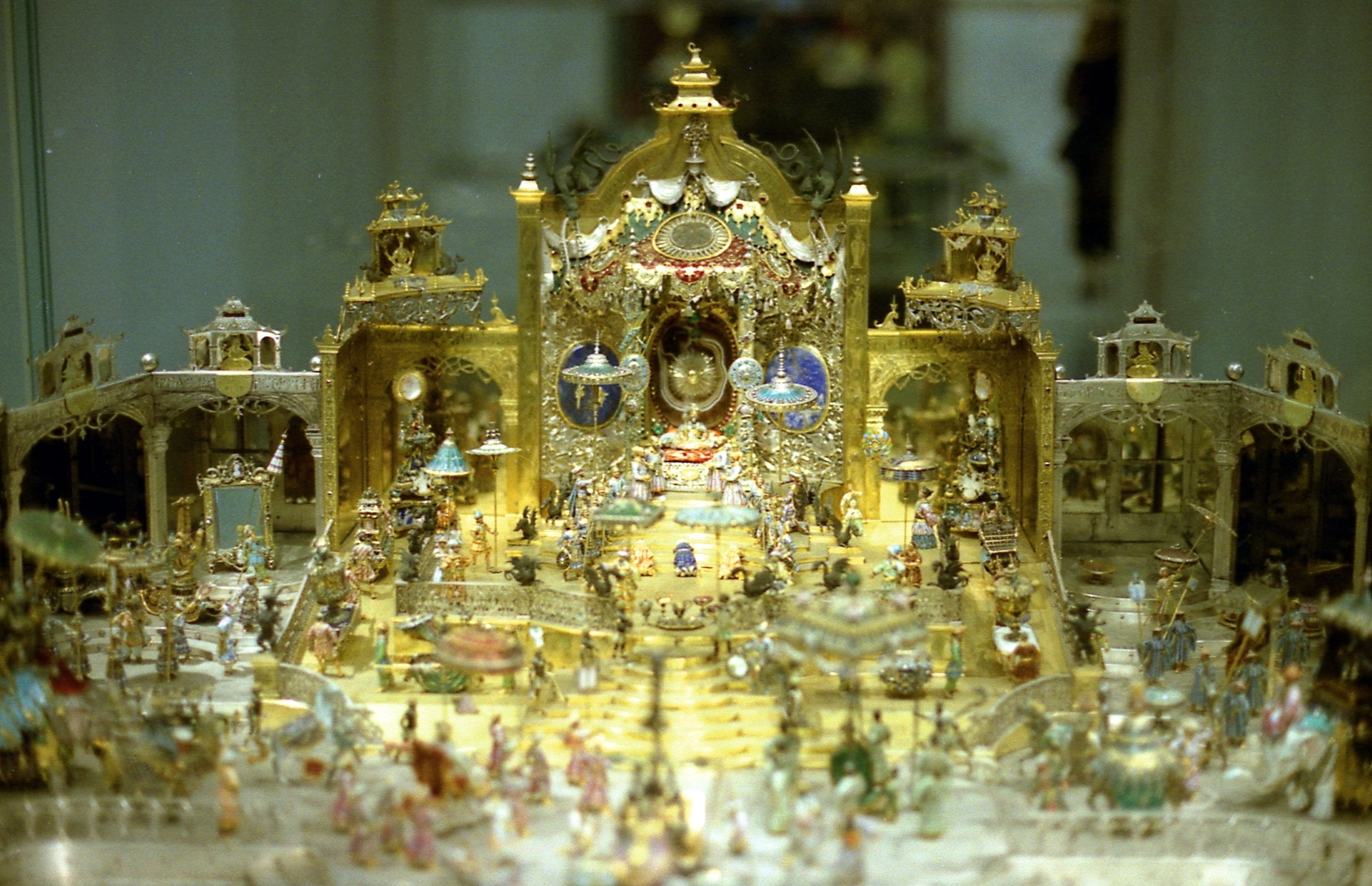
Royal Household at Delhi (1701-1708)

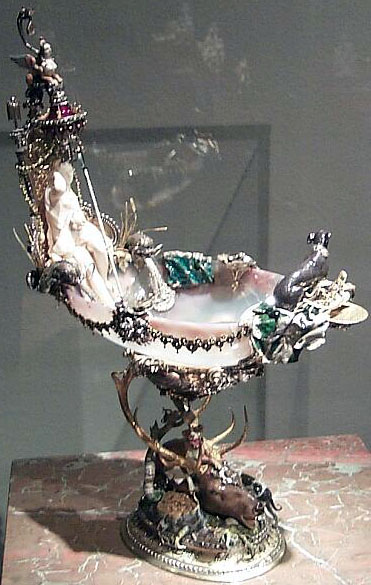
Bath of Diana (1705)

The New Green Vault consists of 12 rooms:

1. Saal der Kunststücke (Hall of Works of Art): Treasures from the second half of the 16th century, such as "Drinking Vessel in the Shape of Daphne".
2. Mikro-Kabinett (Micro Cabinet): Masterpieces of micro-carving, such as the "Cherry Stone With 185 Carved Faces".
3. Kristall-Kabinett (Crystal Cabinet): Pieces made of rock crystal, such as a rock crystal galley with scenes from classical mythology that accompanied Augustus the Strong on the journey to his coronation in Poland.
4. Erster Raum des Kurfürsten (First Elector's Room): Treasures from the first half of the 17th century, such as the "Large Ivory Frigate Supported by Neptune".
5. Zweiter Raum des Kurfürsten (Second Elector's Room): Treasures from the second half of the 17th century, such as table clocks and rock crystal pitchers.
6. Raum der königlichen Pretiosen (Room of Royal Precious Objects): Ivory and pearl pieces, clocks and watches, such as "Nautilus Goblet With Venus" ("Venus Bowl").
7. Dinglinger-Saal (Dinglinger Hall): Pieces made by court goldsmith Johann Melchior Dinglinger, such as the "Golden Coffee Service", "The Royal Household at Delhi on the Occasion of the Birthday of the Grand Mogul Aureng-Zeb", and the "Bath of Diana".
8. Email-Kabinett (Enamel Cabinet): Painted enamels and a large enamel painting depicting Cleopatra's Feast.
9. Raum der reisenden Pretiosen (Travelling Treasures Room): Historical cases for the transport of masterpieces; they were shaped in such a way that the objects they were intended to hold fitted exactly.
10. Neuber-Raum (Neuber Room): Contains masterpieces of Johann Christian Neuber, such as the fragments of a decorative fireplace.
11. Sponsel-Raum (Sponsel Room): Special exhibition room.
12. Watzdorf-Kabinett (Watzdorf Cabinet): Hat clasp decorated with the Dresden Green Diamond, the only large naturally green diamond that has ever been found.

==== Selected exhibits ====
The "Cherry Stone with 185 Carved Faces" was created before 1589 by an unknown artist, probably using a magnifying glass. Actually, only 113 faces can be distinguished on this cherry pit, which is integrated into an earring. This tiny work of art was given as a present to Elector Christian I of Saxony in 1589.

The "Large Ivory Frigate Supported by Neptune" was the last work of Jacob Zeller. It was completed in the summer of 1620, a few months before his death. The frigate, with a crew of almost 50 tiny sailors made of ivory, is supported by the god of the seas. One of the mainsails, also made of extremely thin ivory, displays the coat of arms of elector Johann Georg I and his wife Magdalene Sibylle.

The "Golden Coffee Service" presents the cups and saucers and sugar bowls on an elaborate pyramidal etagère surmounted by the coffeepot, all in enameled gold, a cabinet piece unique in Europe. Here, Dinglinger masterfully combines the most diverse artistic forms to produce an avantgarde work of art which can be regarded as one of the first manifestations of the fashion for chinoiserie. Augustus took the recently completed ensemble with him to Warsaw at Christmas 1701, to dazzle the nobles of the Polish–Lithuanian Commonwealth, of which he was the nominal ruler.

"The Royal Household at Delhi on the Occasion of the Birthday of the Grand Mogul Aureng-Zeb" represents contemporary European fantasies of "Oriental despotism" in India. At the time, Augustus the Strong was under serious threat due to setbacks in the Nordic Wars. In contrast, the Grand Mogul embodies the dream of absolute power and immeasurable riches. This masterpiece of European jewelers’ art comprises 4,909 diamonds, 164 emeralds, 160 rubies, a sapphire, 16 pearls and two cameos. It was created by the royal goldsmith Johann Melchior Dinglinger, his brothers and others, between 1701 and 1708. The elector paid almost 60,000 talers for it, more than he did for the construction of Moritzburg Castle.

The "Bath of Diana" (or "Diana Bathing") was Dinglinger's favorite work: the goddess Diana, carved out of ivory, is seated at the edge of a chalcedony bowl in a filigree that is supported between the horns of a stag's head. Two dolphins spew water into the bowl for her bath. A pearl is suspended in place of the shaft, while the bowl seems to float on the tips of the stag's antlers. This piece depicts the mythological scene in which the unapproachable Diana changes the hunter Actaeon into a deer and has him torn to pieces by his own dogs for having watched her bathing. The base of the piece presents the forest floor, upon which lies the head of the stag Actaeon, with the dogs falling ravenously upon it. The inscription picked out in diamonds on the rim of the base reads, "DISCRETION SERT EFFRONTERIE PERD" ("Discretion is laudable, indiscretion unwise").

The 41-carat (8.2 g) Dresden Green Diamond is the most valuable diamond in the whole Green Vault. The stone's unique green color is due to natural exposure to radioactive materials. It was acquired by Augustus III of Poland from a Dutch merchant in 1742 at the Leipzig Fair. Augustus ordered his "house diamond" to be mounted into a decorative badge of the Golden Fleece. His grandson Frederick Augustus I of Saxony commissioned the Dresden court jeweler Diesbach to alter it radically. The framed diamond was incorporated into an extremely valuable hat ornament. It became the focal point of a 14.1 cm (5.6 in) high hat clasp, where it was surrounded by two large colorless diamonds of 19.3-carat (3.86 g) and 6.3-carat (1.26 g) carat plus 411 additional medium-sized and small diamonds. This is the setting that the Dresden Green Diamond still appears in today.

== See also ==
- List of museums in Saxony
