= Saxon Jenkins =

Harold David Saxon Jenkins, known as Sax, (15 April 1907 - 1989) was a Welsh landscape painter during the inter-war years. Most of his work is now believed to have been lost.

== Early life and family ==
Jenkins was born in Skewen, Swansea on 15 April 1907. At the time of the 1911 census he was living in the household of his grandmother in Swansea. He married and had five daughters and one son.

== Career ==
Jenkins joined Ely Mill as an office boy in 1921. His art career as an amateur was during the inter-war years when he produced landscapes and submitted to the Royal Academy of Arts. As far as is known, he ceased painting around the time of the outbreak of the World War II when he was a policeman and he did not resume painting. He rejoined Ely Mill in 1953 as an electrician.

== Death ==
Jenkins died in 1989.
