= Chimnabai Clock Tower =

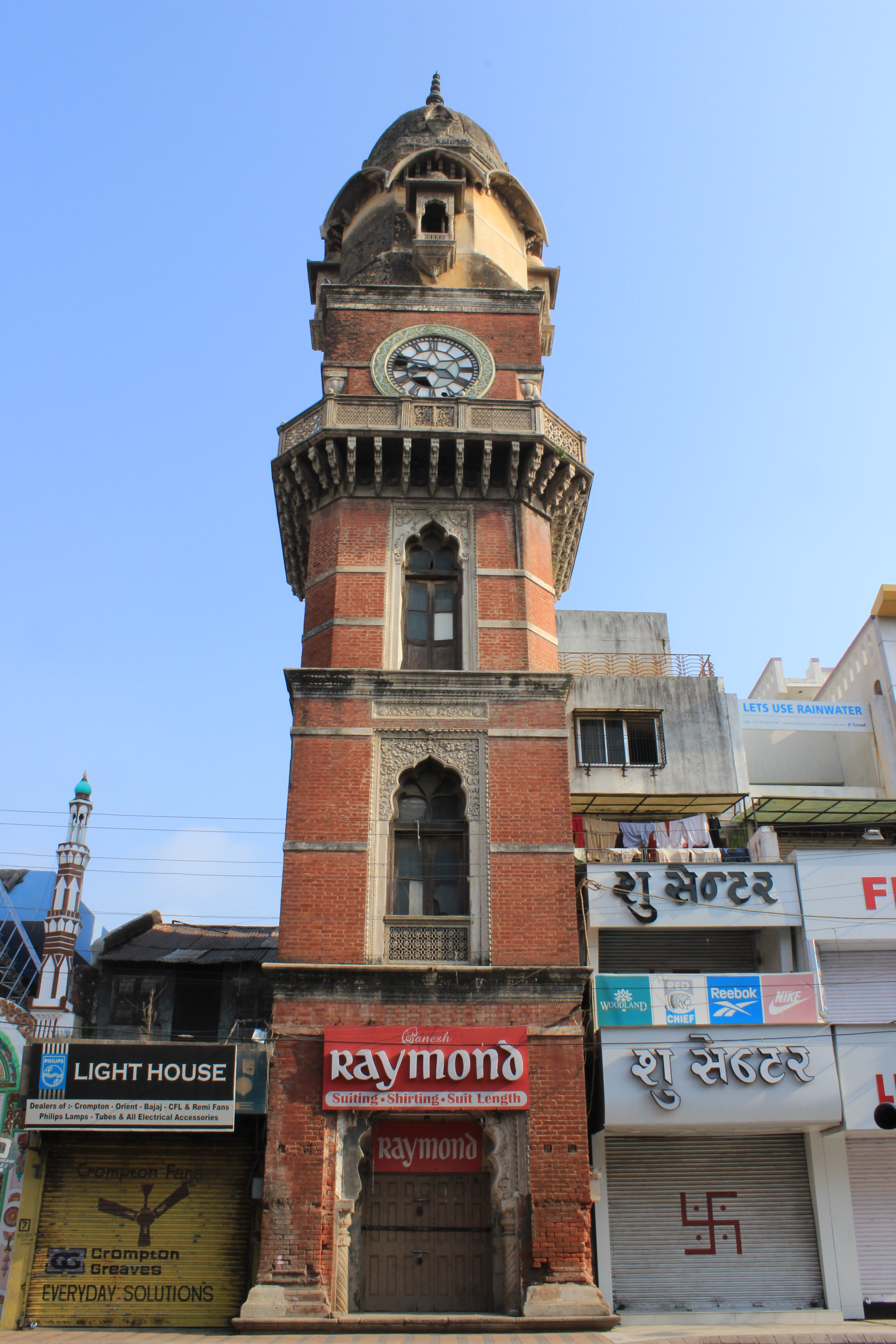
- Chimnabai Clock Tower

- Location within Gujarat

General information
- Architectural style: Indo-Saracenic architecture
- Location: Vadodara, Gujarat, India
- Coordinates: 22°18′14.3″N 73°12′02.7″E
- Completed: 1896
- Cost: ₹25,000
- Client: Baroda State

Technical details
- Structural system: Red brick and Yellow sandstone
- Size: 108 ft (33 m)

Design and construction
- Architect: unknown

The Chimnabai Clock Tower, also known as the Raopura Tower, is a clock tower situated in the Raopura area of Vadodara, Gujarat, India. It was completed in 1896 and named in memory of Chimnabai I (1864–1885), a queen and the first wife of Sayajirao Gaekwad III of Baroda State. It was built in Indo-Saracenic architecture style.

== History ==
Chimnabai Clock Tower was built in 1896. The tower was named after Chimnabai I (1864–1885), a queen and the first wife of Sayajirao Gaekwad III of Baroda State. It was inaugurated by Mir Kamaluddin Hussainkhan, the last Nawab of Baroda. During the rule of Gaekwad, it was a stoppage for horse-drawn trams. The clock tower was erected at the cost of ₹25,000 (equivalent to ₹9.3 million or US$110,000 in 2023). It was constructed from the funds raised by the citizens of Baroda State.

The premises of the tower were rented by the Vadodara Municipal Corporation for the last three decades. In 2017, the municipal commissioner, Vinod Rao, ordered to vacate the tower to conserve it as a heritage monument. The mechanical system of the tower clock was replaced by DC motor. The tower is lit up in the evening.

== Architecture ==
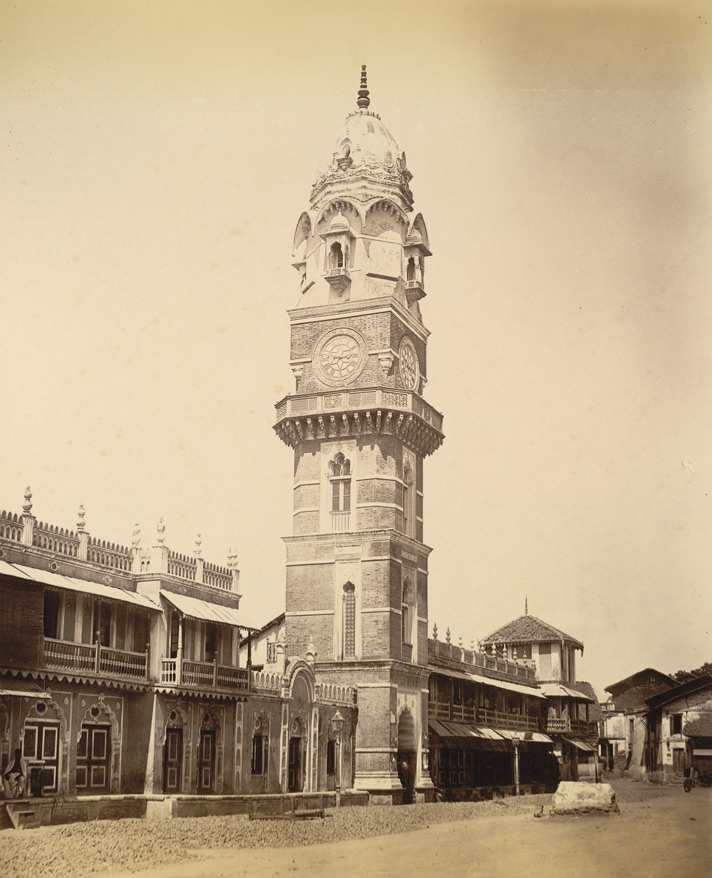
The tower in the 1890s

The tower was built in Indo-Saracenic architecture style. The five storied tower is built with red bricks. The ground floor has a narrow spiral staircase that leads to upper floors. The first three floors have cusped arched openings decorated with fine stucco work on each side. A huge clock made by John Taylor & Co was brought from London by Sayajirao and fitted to fourth floor. The clock is six feet in diameter and its minute hand is of 3 feet in length. The top floor is octagonal. It has the jharokha with jali-work on all eight sides of the parapet. A steeple stands at the top.

== Chimes ==
During the Gaekwad rule, the mechanical system was used to play tunes every 15 minutes, which later changed to every hour. Later, the mechanical system was replaced by an electric connection and now the chimes are muted.

== See also ==
- Chimnabai Lake
- Nyay Mandir
