= List of tourist attractions in Vadodara =

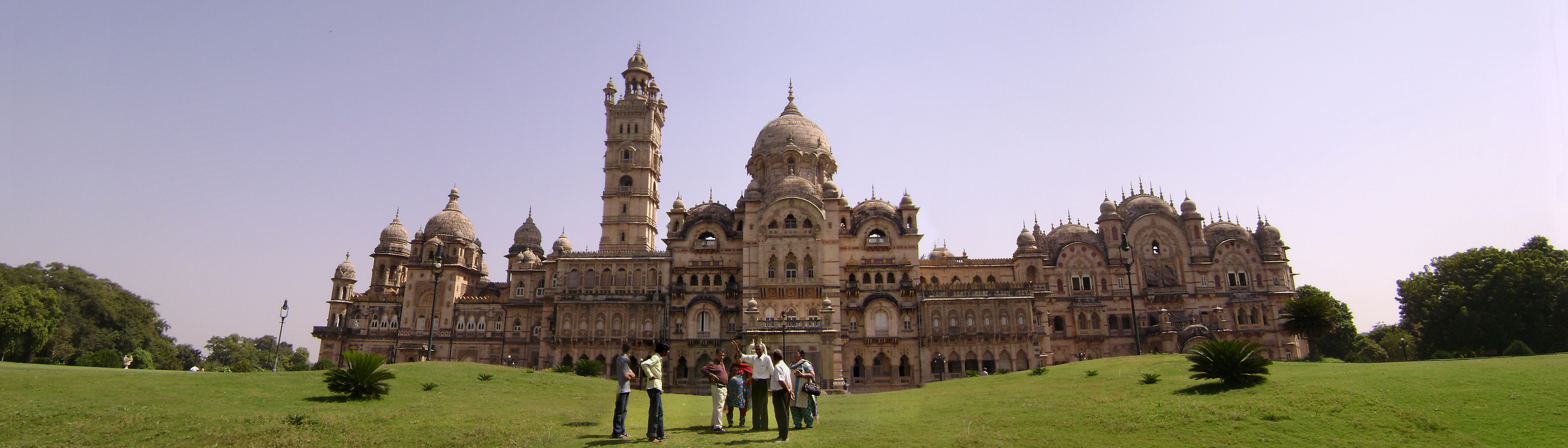
Lakshmi Vilas Palace

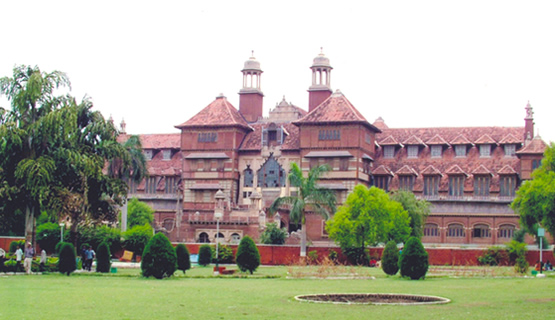
Baroda Museum & Picture Gallery

This is a list of tourist attractions in Vadodara, a city in Gujarat, India.

== Prime attractions ==
- Laxmi Vilas Palace - The largest and most iconic palace in Vadodara.
- Sayaji Baug - The extensive garden house contains Vadodara Zoo and Baroda Museum & Picture Gallery.
- Maharaja Fateh Singh Museum
- Nazarbaug Palace
- Makarpura Palace
- Wadhvana Wetland - A shallow water body created as a result of a stop dam built in 1910. It eventually became a bird sanctuary and was declared a Ramsar site in 2001. It is one of the most important birding spots in Gujarat.
- Champaner-Pavagadh Archaeological Park - A UNESCO World Heritage site located about 45 kilometres northeast of Vadodara. Rebuilt by the Gujarat Sultans in the early 16th century over an ancient site, the medieval city consists of various mosques, tombs and other significant monuments which reflect the richness of the Gujarat Sultanate architecture.

== Other attractions ==
- Kirti Mandir
- Nyay Mandir
- Hazira Maqbara
- Khanderao Market and Kirti Stambh
- Sursagar Lake
- National Academy of Indian Railways
- EME Temple

== Gallery ==
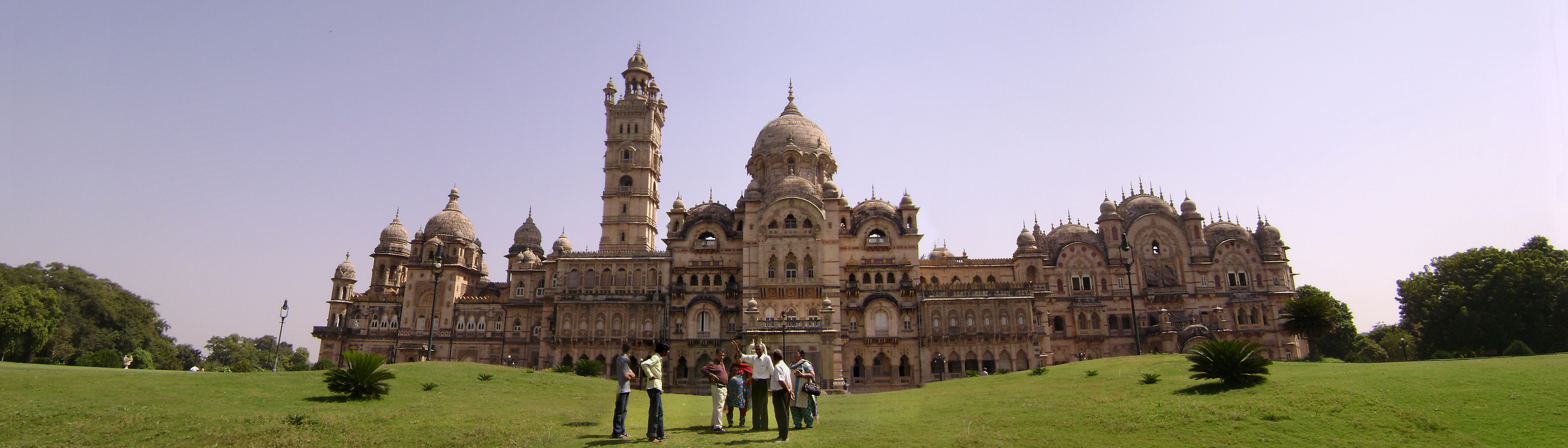
Lakshmi Vilas Palace

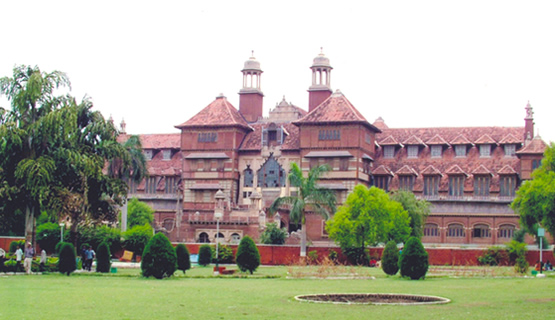
Baroda Museum & Picture Gallery
