= Chimnabai I =

Queen of Baroda State (1880–1885)

Maharani Chimnabai I
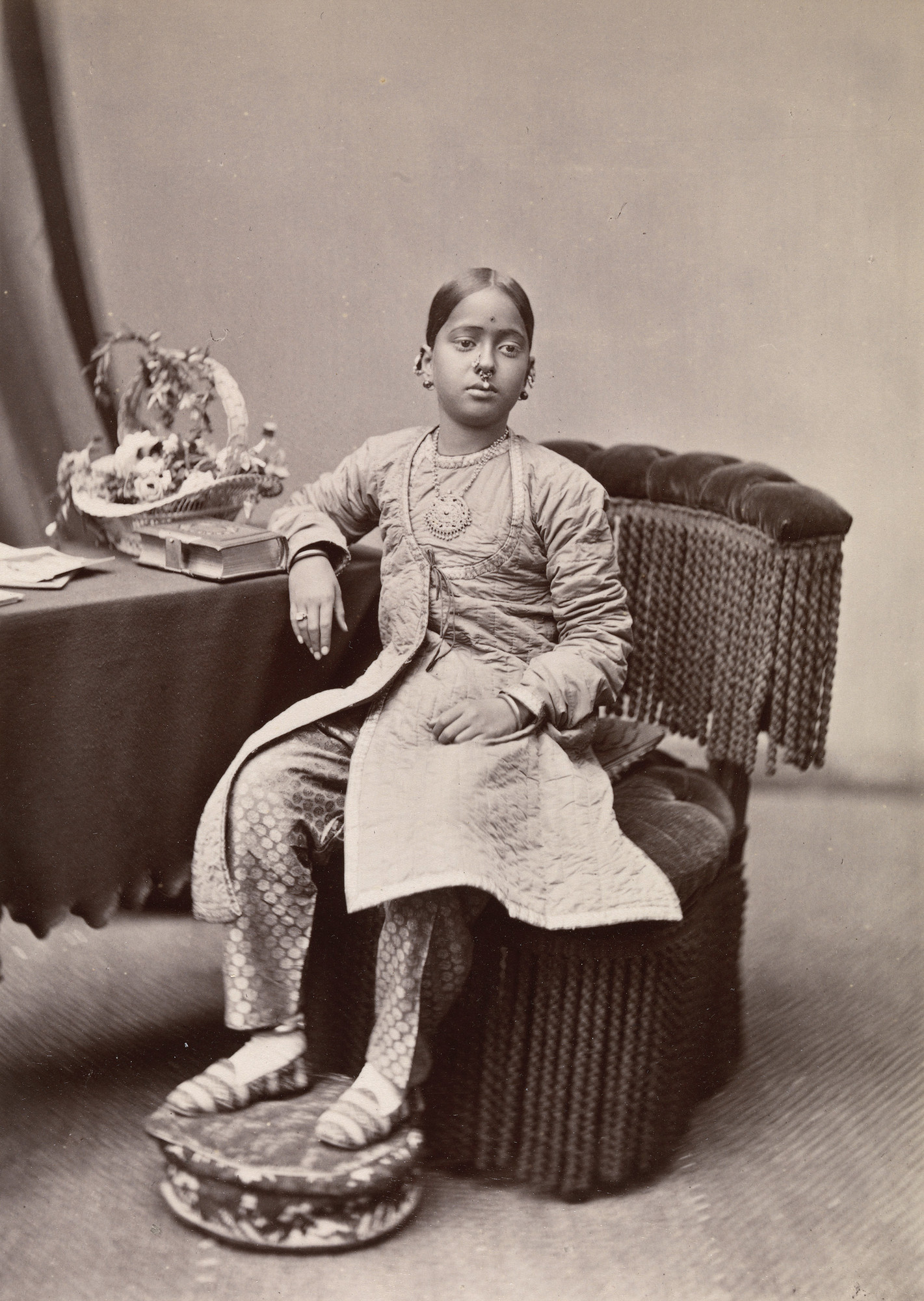
- Full-length portrait as Princess Srimant Lakshmibai

Maharani of Baroda
- Tenure: 1880–1885
- Born: Lakshmibai Mohite; 1864; Tanjore
- Died: 7 May 1885 (aged 20–21); Baroda
- Spouse: Sayajirao Gaekwad III (m. 1880)
- Issue: Bajubai (1881–1883); Putlabai (1882–1885); Fatehsingh Rao (1883–1908)
- House: Gaekwad
- Father: Shrimant Sardar Haibat Rao Sahib Chavan Mohite
- Mother: Nagamma Bai Sahib Mohite
- Religion: Hinduism

Maharani Chimnabai I (1864 – 7 May 1885) was a queen and the first wife of Maharaja Sayajirao Gaekwad III of the princely state of Baroda (now in Gujarat), British India. Several memorials were built by Sayajirao following her early death.

== Biography ==
Chimnabai was born Lakshmibai in a Maratha family to her parents Shrimant Sardar Haibat Rao Sahib Chavan Mohite and Nagamma Bai Sahib Mohite in 1864. Her father was Amirrao of Tanjore and known as Daji Sahib. Her mother was a daughter of Sri Abaji Rao Ghatge, Serjirao, of Tanjore. Lakshmibai, along with her two sisters, were adopted by princess Vijaya Mohana (1845–1885) who was the daughter of Sivaji, the last Maharaja of Tanjore. There is not much details about her life. She was educated at the Tanjore Fort. She had training in Sadir Attam dance and she played veena. As a dowry, a Sadir Attam dance troupe was sent with her to Baroda which introduced the dance form there.

She changed her name to Chimnabai I when she married Sayajirao Gaekwad III of Baroda State on 6 January 1880. They had two daughters and a son. Both of their daughters; Bajubai (1881–1883) and Putlabai (1882–1885); died at an early age.

The foundation stone of the present royal residence of the Gaekwad family was laid by Sayajirao and Chimnabai. The palace is named Lakshmi Vilas Palace after her birth name Lakshmi.

She died on 7 May 1885 of pregnancy related complications. After the birth of Fatehsingh Rao (b.1883), she died due to pregnancy related complications. According to Hirschfeld J., she died from tuberculosis.

== Memorials ==
"I wish to commemorate the virtues of Her Late Highness and the admiration I entertained for her-the mild, charitable, amiable woman, the devoted mother and loving wife."

—Words by Sayajirao Gaekwad III as he laid the foundation stone for ‘The Maharani Chimnabai Market’ in memory of his queen.

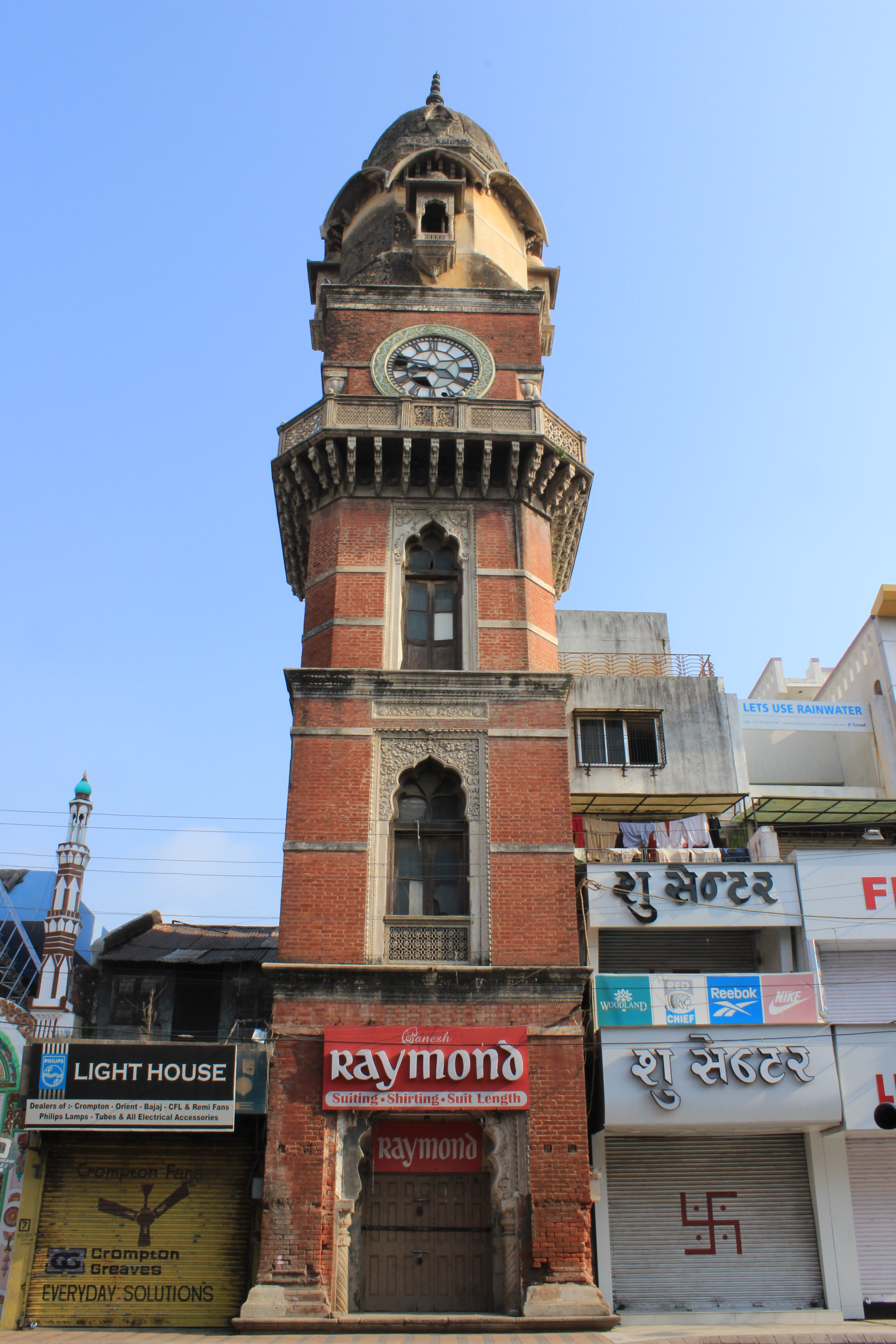
Clock tower at Raopura area of Vadodara named as Chimnabai Clock Tower

Sayajirao Gaekwad III built the clock tower at Raopura area of Vadodara and named it as Chimnabai Clock Tower (1896) in her memory.

A vegetable market near Sursagar Lake was built and named 'The Maharani Chimnabai Market', which was later used as a town hall. The building was then converted in an imperial court named Maharani Chimnabai Nyay Mandir. A white marble statue of the queen is placed in the main room of the Nyay Mandir.

As Chimnabai had died due to pregnancy-related complications, a hospital was built in 1885 in Baroda by Sayajirao for the well-being and safe delivery of other women of the state. The hospital was named Dufferin Hospital as it was inaugurated by Lord Dufferin, the then governor of the Bombay Presidency. At present, the hospital is known as Sir Sayajirao General Hospital.

A lake was constructed by Sayajirao in Kadarpur village near Kheralu in memory of Chimnabai I and named Chimnabai Lake. The construction was started in 1898 and completed in 1905. It has a water storage capacity of 632 million cubic feet.

The girl students who have excelled in medical education at the Baroda Medical College are honoured with the prize named after Chimnabai I.

A white marble statue of Chimnabai I is placed in the Baroda Museum & Picture Gallery.
