= Central Library, Vadodara =

Public library in Vadoara, India

Central Library
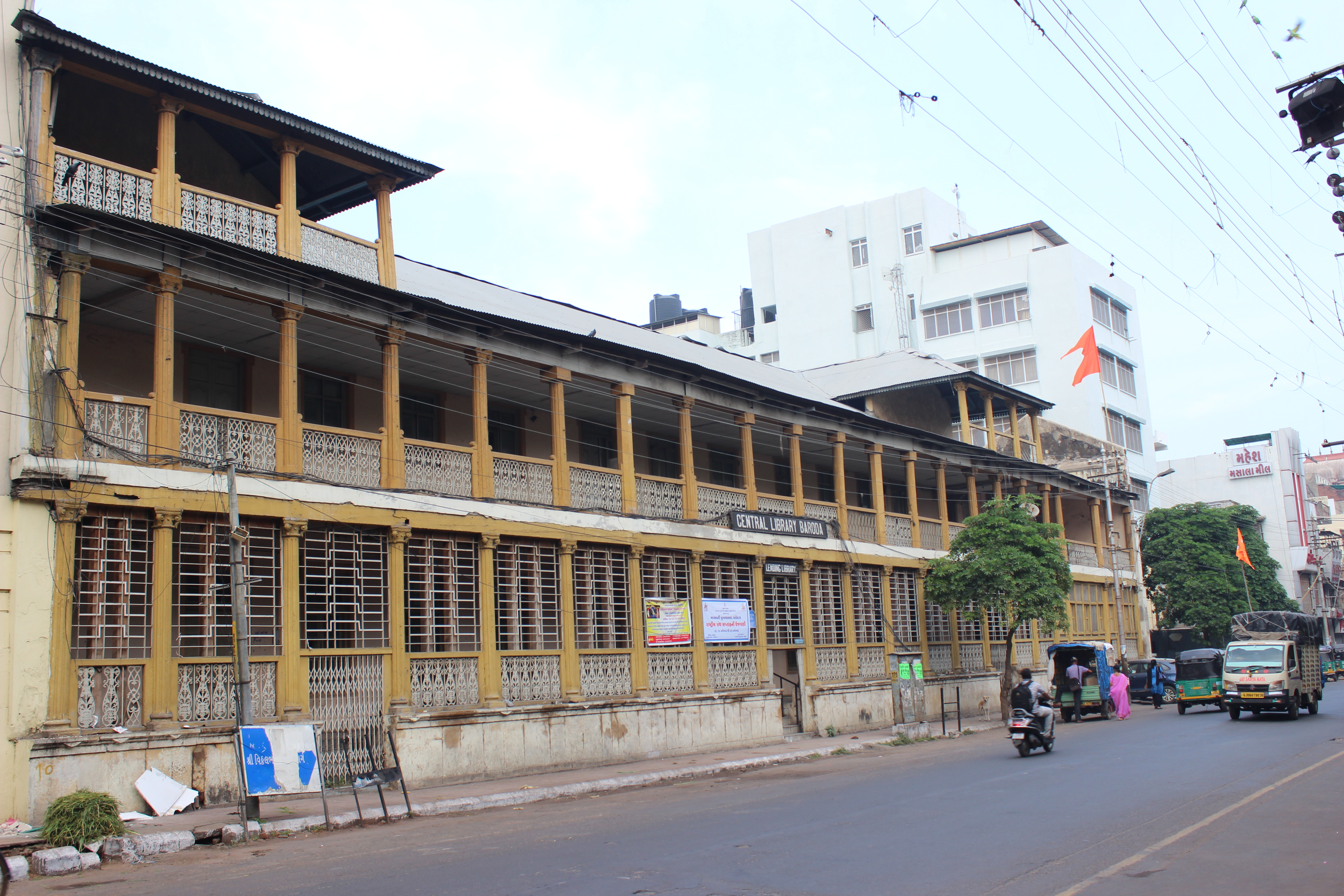
- 22.184°N 73.1237°E
- Location: Bank of Baroda Road, Mandavi, 390006, India
- Type: Membership library
- Branches: 1

Collection
- Size: c. 290,000

Access and use
- Members: c. 8000

Central Library, also known as Madhyavarti Pustakalay, is a public library situated in Vadodara, Gujarat, India. It was built up by Sayajirao Gaekwad III and is now managed by the Directorate of libraries, Government of Gujarat.

== Background ==
Central Library was established in 1910. Originally, it was a part of personal library of Sayajirao Gaekwad III, located in Laxmi Vilas Palace which was later transferred to the present building in front of Sarkarwada, Mandvi. Books from the Palace Library and the personal collection of Sampatrao Gaekwad were added to its collection.

== Building ==
The library building was designed by William Alanson Borden along with Sir Edward Lutyens, based on the design of the Library of Congress, Washington, D.C. It's a four storyed building made up of various materials such as wooden beams, bricks, cement, steel, mica, Belgian glass and copper.

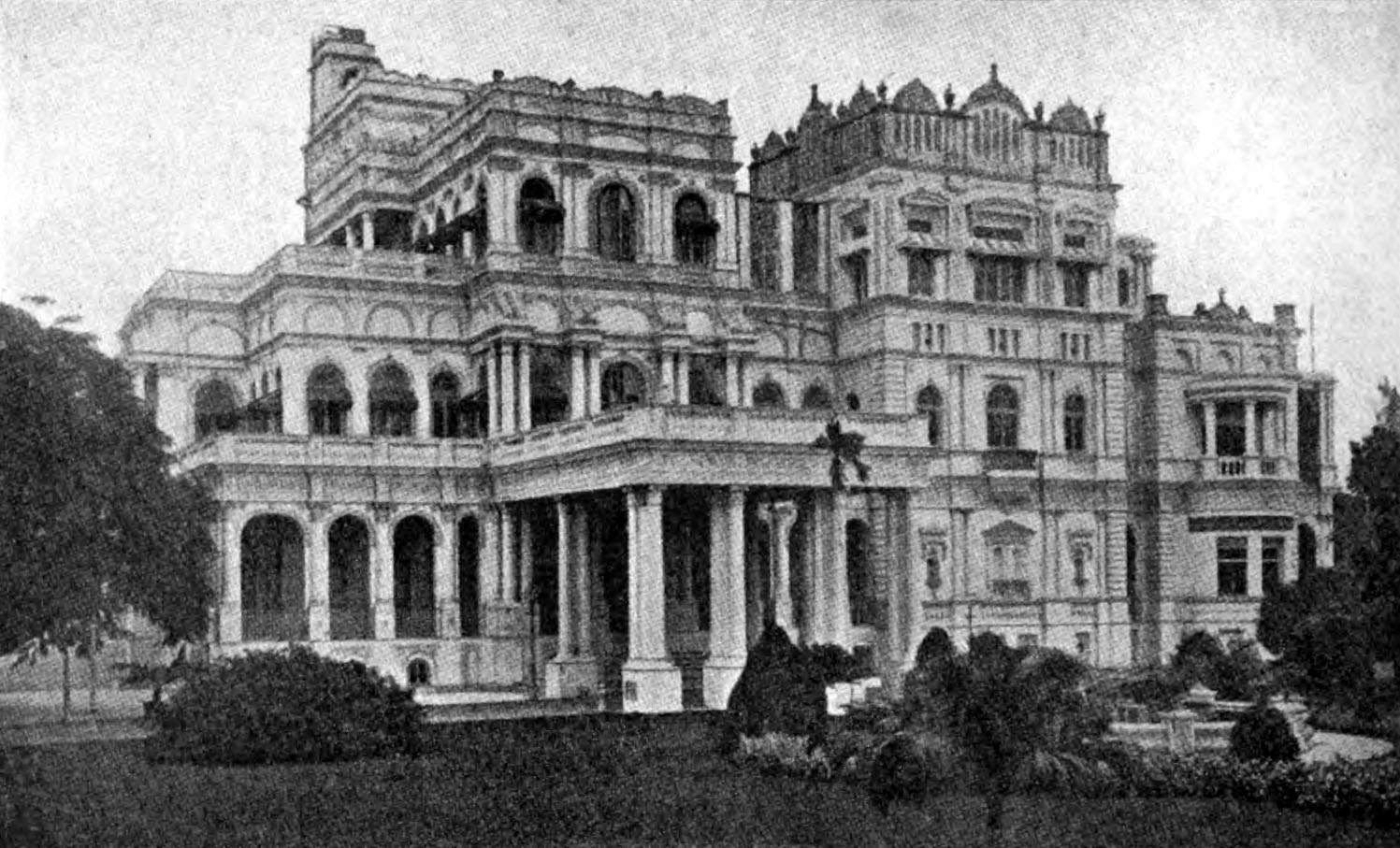
Photograph of the Central Library building of Baroda India, formerly a majarajah's palace

== See also ==
- List of tourist attractions in Vadodara
- List of libraries in India
