= Dabhoi =

Dabhoi ડભોઈ
- Town
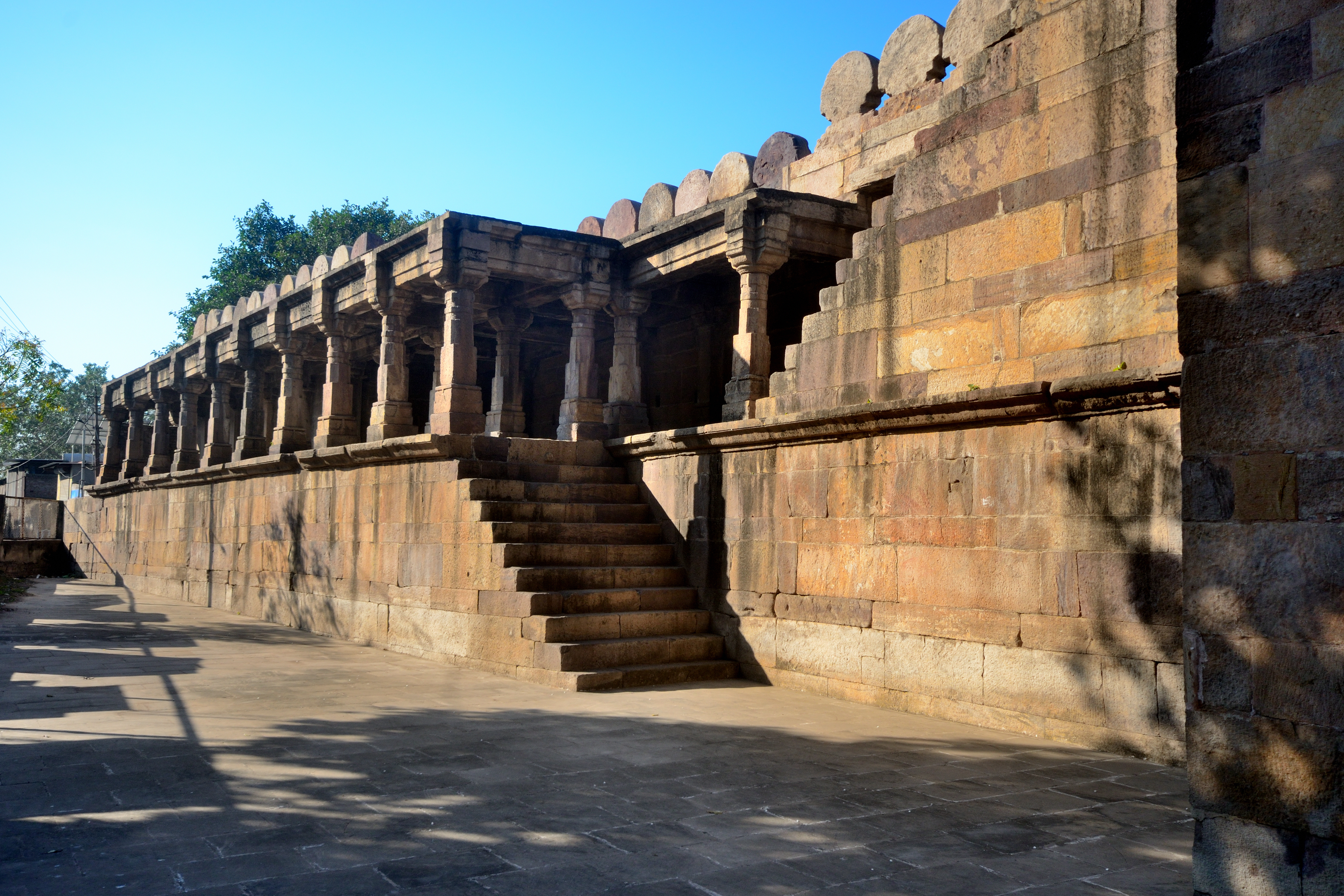
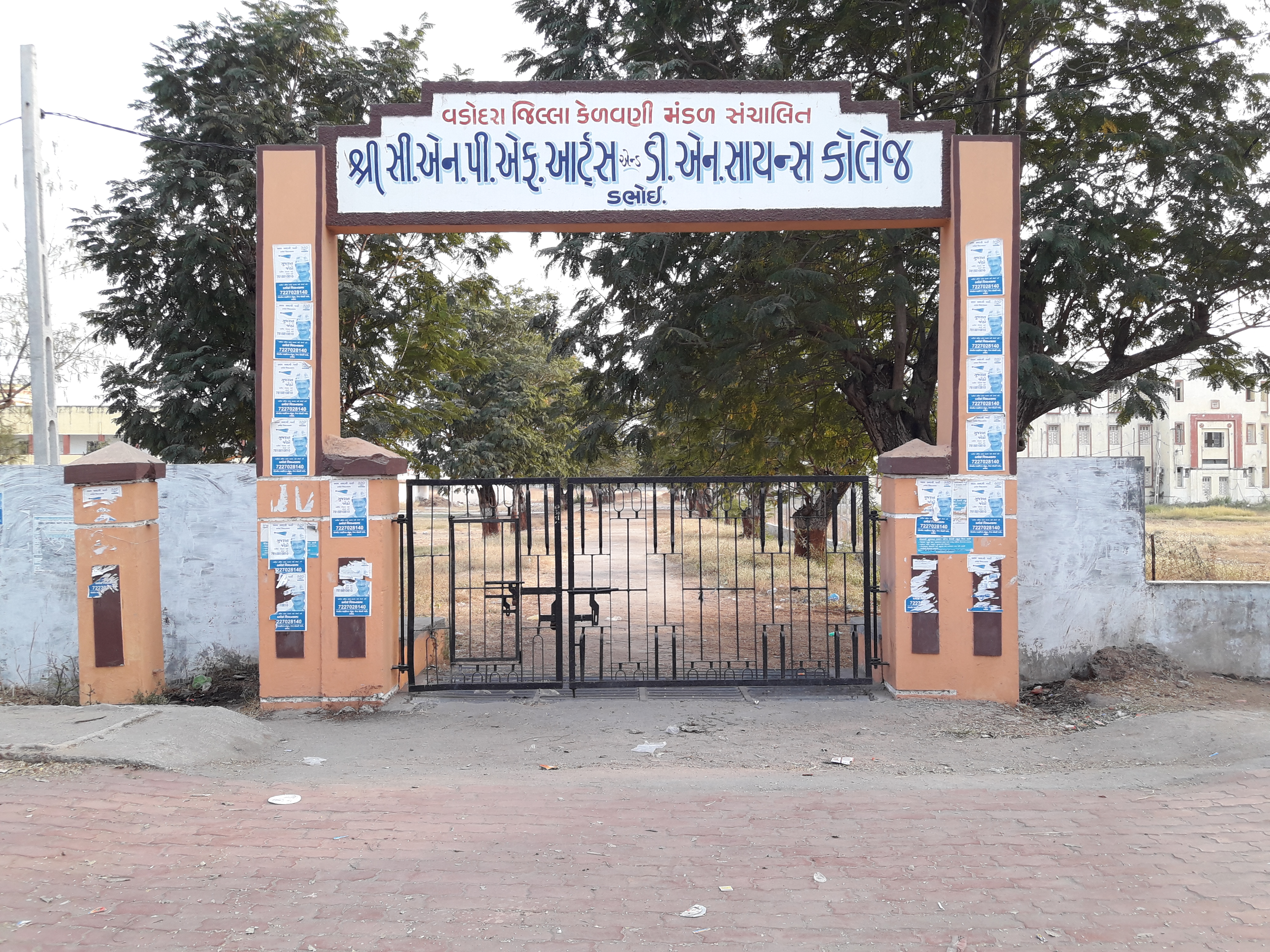
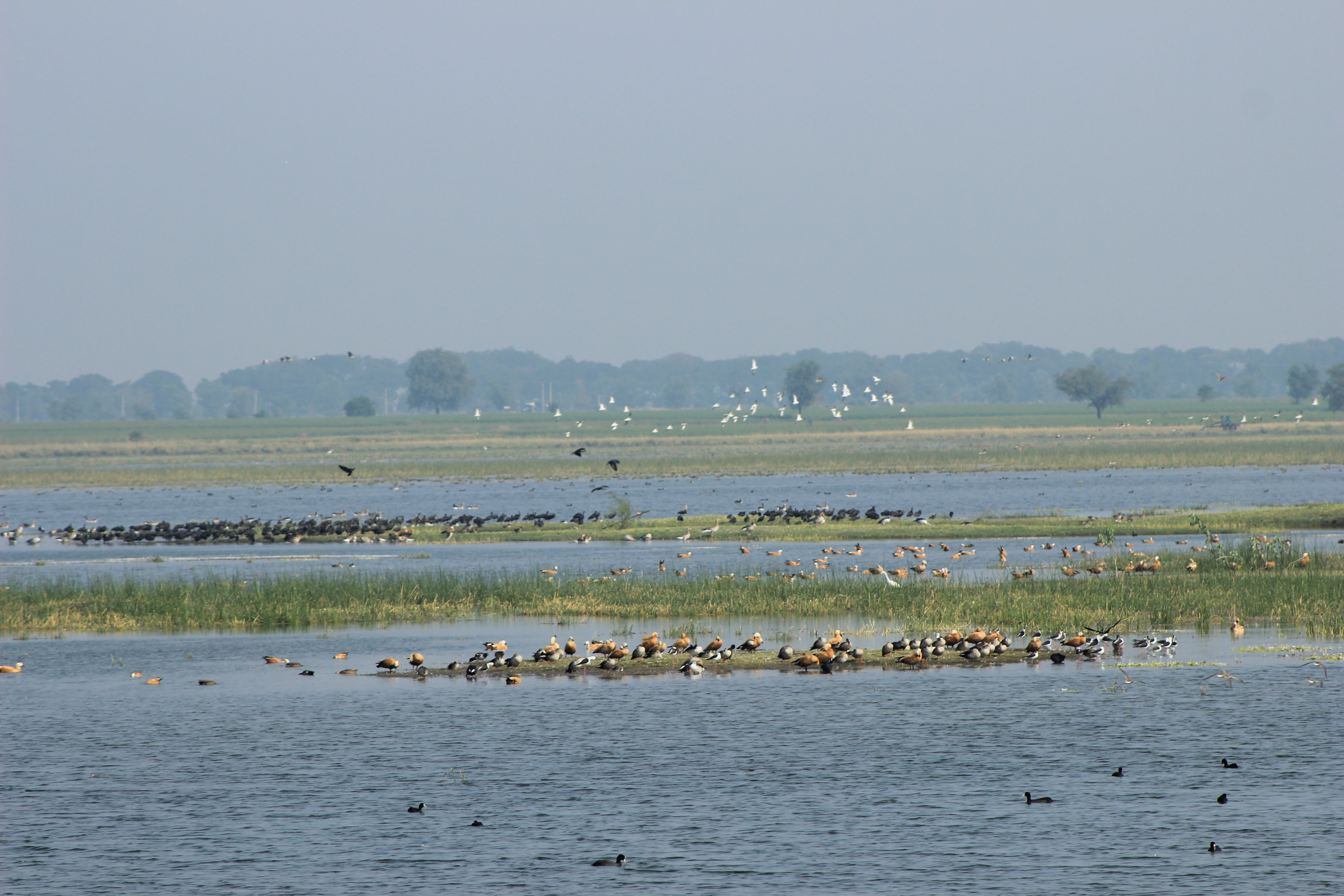
- Top: A historical outer wall of the Vadodari Gate. Bottom left: A gate of Arts & Science College. Bottom right: A Wadhavana bird sanctuary in Wadhavana lake.

- Location in Gujarat, India
- Coordinates: 22.1376000°N 73.4161719°E
- Country: India
- State: Gujarat
- District: Vadodara

Government
  - Body: Municipality
- Elevation: 99 m (325 ft)

Population (2011)
  - Total: 51,240

Languages
  - Official: Gujarati, Hindi, English
- Time zone: UTC+5:30 (IST)
- PIN: 391110
- Telephone code: +91-2663
- Vehicle registration: GJ-06
- Lok Sabha constituency: Chhota Udaipur
- Vidhan Sabha constituency: Dabhoi

Dabhoi is a town and a municipality in the Vadodara district in the state of Gujarat, India.

Dabhoi has a big popular sunni masjid (mosque) named Kaziwad Masjid.

== Name ==
Dabhoi (Gujarati: ડભોઈ, romanized: Ḍabhoī) is the tadbhava (inherited) form of the Sanskrit name Darbhavatī, also spelled Darbhāvatī. The name Darbhavatī refers to a place with an abundance of the sacred kusha grass, Desmostachya bipinnata. The first known attestation of the name Darbhavatī is in the Romaka Siddhānta, a 6th-century astronomical treatise. Other historical names used for Dabhoi were Darbhikāgrāma, used in the Vikramacharita of Rāmachandra-sūri, which was written at Dabhoi in the year 1433, and Darbhavatīpura, used in some Jain texts.

== History ==
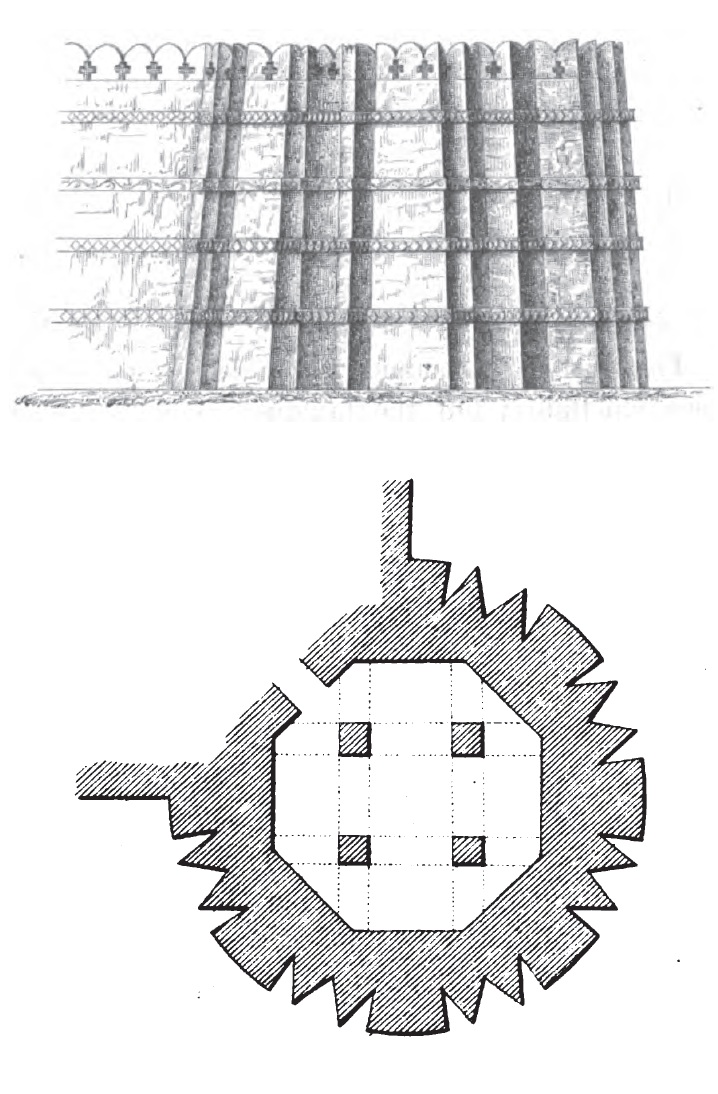
Plan and elevation of the corner tower of fortress of Dabhoi

Dabhoi has presumably existed since at least the 6th century, since it is mentioned in the 6th-century Romaka Siddhanta|Romaka Siddhānta. It historically was an important pilgrim site for Hindus due to the Kalika temple and for Jains as well. It is also mentioned in several Jain works, such as Hemachandra's Yogartrevritti and Ramchandra's Vikramcharitra.

The town and its surroundings were under Chavda and later under Chaulukya rulers who built few buildings and temples from the ninth century.

The fortification of it is ascribed to the Chaulukya king of Gujarat, Jayasimha Siddharaja (1093-1143 AD), who made this his frontier fortress. The architectural style and the exquisite stone carving and iconography on the fort walls and gates suggest that it was conceived and constructed in the same period as Rudra Mahalaya and Zinzuwada Fort. It is mentioned as an important city in the Jain inscriptions of Girnar (VS 1288).

In the 13th century, the town came under Vaghela rule. The information on Dabhoi can be found in prashastis and inscriptions such as Someshwar prashasti, which mentions that the fort surrounding the town was built (1231 CE) during the reign of Vaghela ruler Viradhavala, father of Visaladeva, who made it his frontier fortress. He carried out the construction as a celebration of the birth of his son. The gates of it were said to construct by his ministers Vastupala and Tejapala.

The Vaidyanatha-Mahadeva temple, Parsavanath Jain temple, torana in white marble, Vireshwara temple, and Kumbeshwara complex was also built in the 13th century. Of all these, only gates, Vaidyanatha Mahadeva temple, and Parshwanath Jain temples are in good condition. The ruins of other structures and a kund suggest the grandeur of the town in the 13th and 14th centuries. It came under the Gujarat Sultanate later.

It was a district headquarter during the Mughal rule in Gujarat.

The battle of Dabhoi was fought on 1 April 1731 between Trimbakrao Dabhade and Bajirao Peshwa.

Later it was under the Baroda State.

== Monuments ==
The fort of Dabhoi is one of the rare surviving examples of Hindu military architecture, based on the shastri traditions described in various Vastu scriptures.

According to the 19th century source, the fort complex covered an area of 800 x 1000 sq. yards. There are four gates in the town, one in each cardinal direction, having indirect entry, located in the middle of each side of the fort wall. These gates are: Hira gate or Hira Bhagol in the east, Baroda or Vadodara gate in the west, Chandod or Nandod gate in the south, and Champaner, Mori, Mahudi or Mahmudi gate in the north. Baroda or Vadodara, Chandod, and Champaner gates lead to the cities by those names, whereas the Hira gate was the entrance to the Kalika Temple.

The origin of the name "Hīrā" (literally "diamond" or "jewel") for the Hira gate is unclear. According to legend, it was named after its builder, a master mason named Hīrā. Hiranand Sastri dismissed both this and the literal interpretation as "a jewel of gates" as unsatisfactory; he suggested a possible connection to Hīra, an epithet of Shiva, since a now-ruined temple of Shiva-Vaidyanatha exists immediately south of the gate, but called his own suggestion "pedantic".

The Hira gate has been heavily modified since its original construction, especially the outer side; the inner, city-facing side is more intact, although its middle part has also been rebuilt. The gate was probably originally covered in intricate carvings, but very little has survived on the actual gate part; the extant carving is mostly on the northern side adjoining the Kalika-Mata temple, and on parts of the south side where the Vaidyanatha shrine partly survives (although most of this area is also no longer extant).

The Vadodara gate is the best-preserved of the four gates, and is mostly intact. It originally had six bracketed supports, resting atop pilasters and each supporting an architrave, but the third from the outside was later replaced with an archway. The original cornices overhanging both sides are only partially preserved today.

The Mahudi and Nandod gates are not as tall as the Vadodara gate, and they each have only four brackets instead of six, but they are ornately carved. The Mahudi gate was completed in VS 1344 (i.e. 1287-88 CE), about 33 years after the Someshvara prashasti. Among its elaborate sculptures (helpfully labelled), the largest and most prominent is Shiva, depicted here as Naṭarāja, the king of dancers. This depiction portrays Shiva as the divine creator, with the movement of his dancing setting the universe in motion. The other deities depicted here (all smaller than Shiva) include Parvati, Ganesha, Bhringi, Brahmani, and Chamunda.

As for the Nandod gate, it originally featured a sculptural depiction of the Trimurti, but the sculpture of Vishnu is now missing, leaving only Shiva (seated on Nandi) and Brahma.

The city walls are now mostly demolished, presumably dismantled to provide stone for building other structures. A few stretches of the walls remain, especially a mostly-intact section by the Vadodara Gate. One of the corner towers, by the train station, has become a Muslim religious site called the pānch-bībī-kī-dargāh, where supposedly five young Muslim women are buried.

There is a large artificial tank in the middle of the town, irregular in shape and with a piece of land jutting out into it on the south side. There is a small shrine on the west side of this piece of land, with its floor now submerged beneath the water's surface; it was probably originally a temple of Shiva.

Gates of Dabhoi
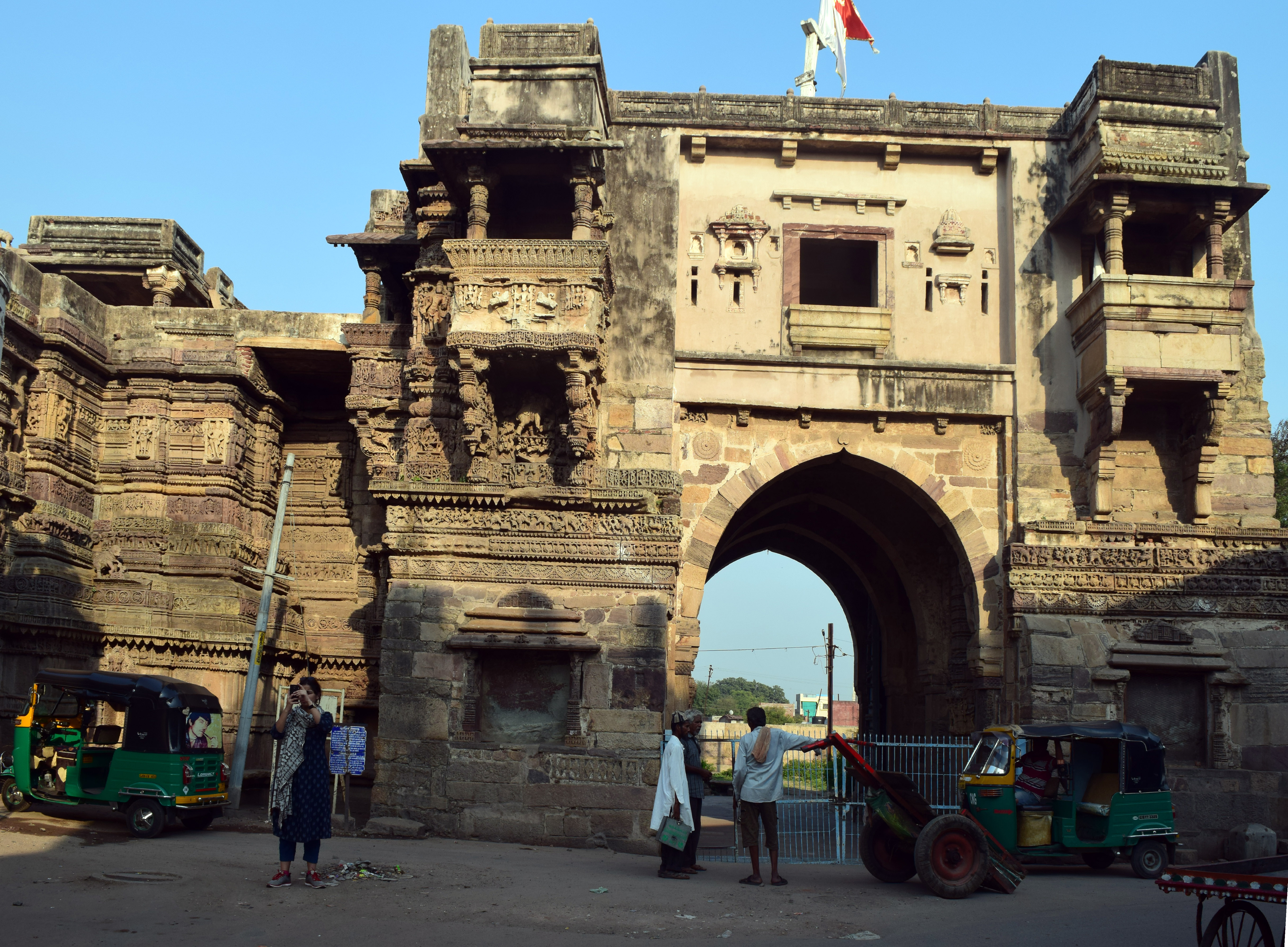
Inner (city-facing) side of the Hira Gate. Most of the original carving has been lost, and the structure has been heavily modified.

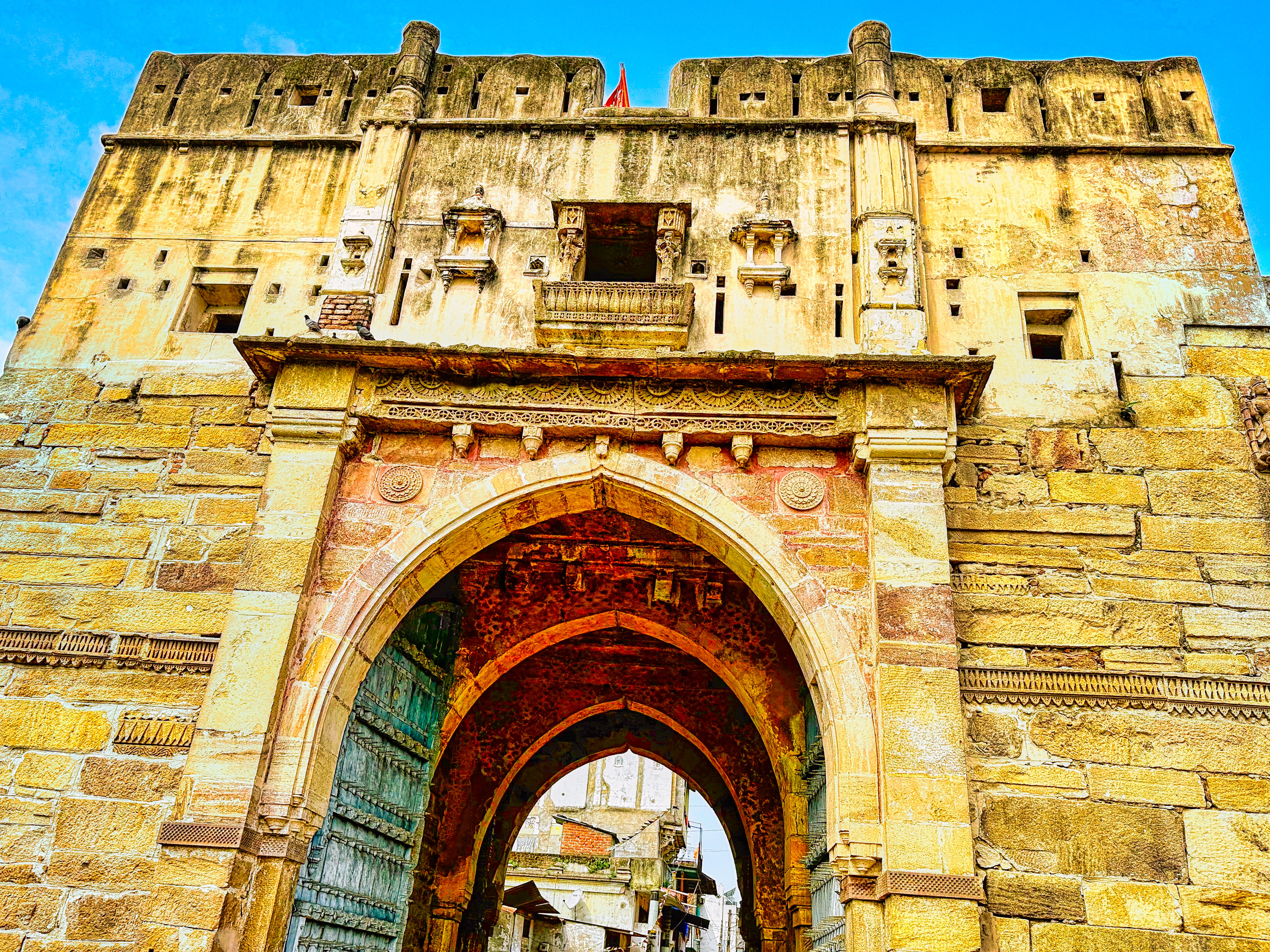
The outer side of the Hira Gate has been almost completely rebuilt since its original construction.

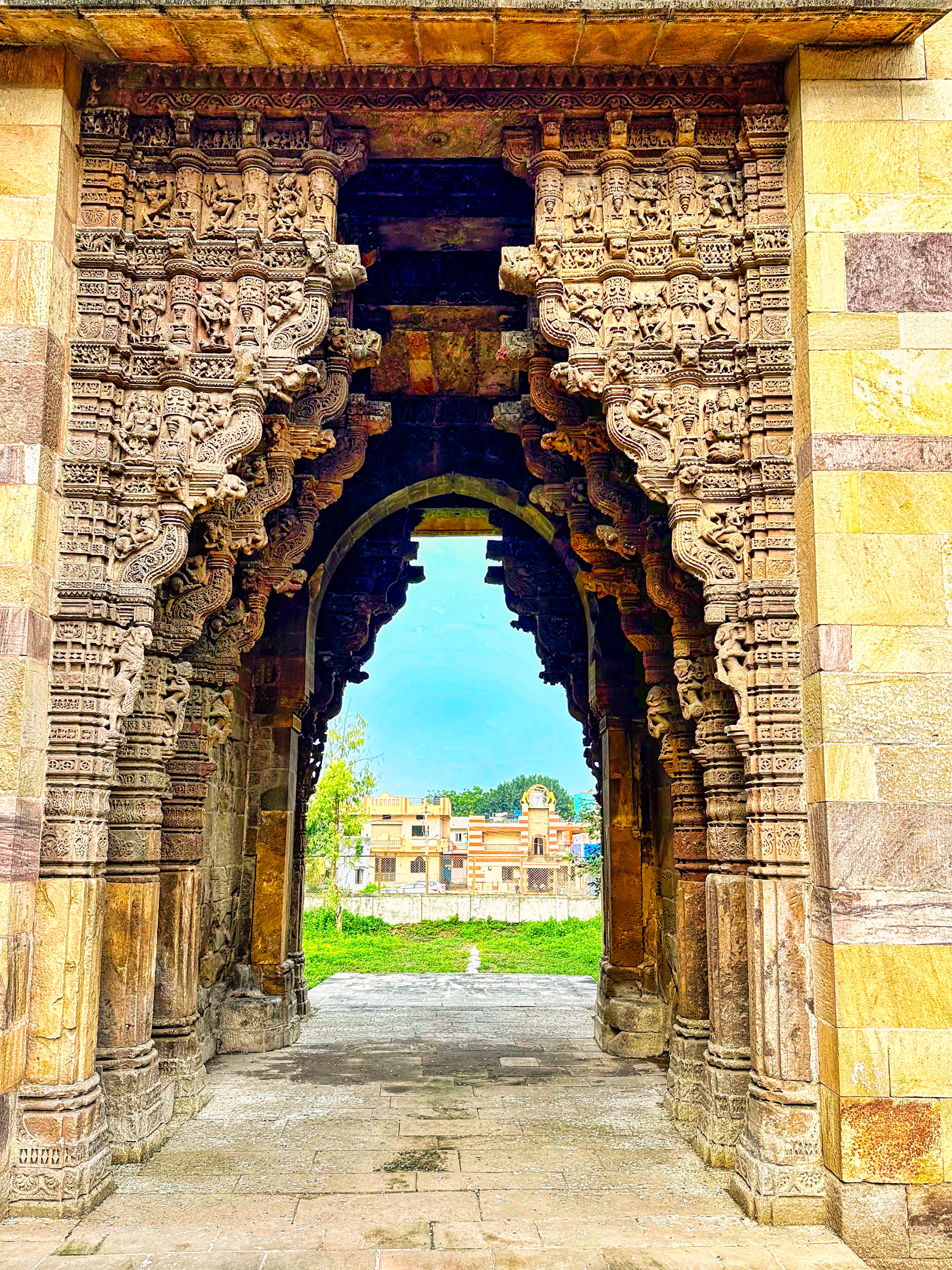
The Vadodara Gate is the best-preserved of the four gates, and features ornate carvings.

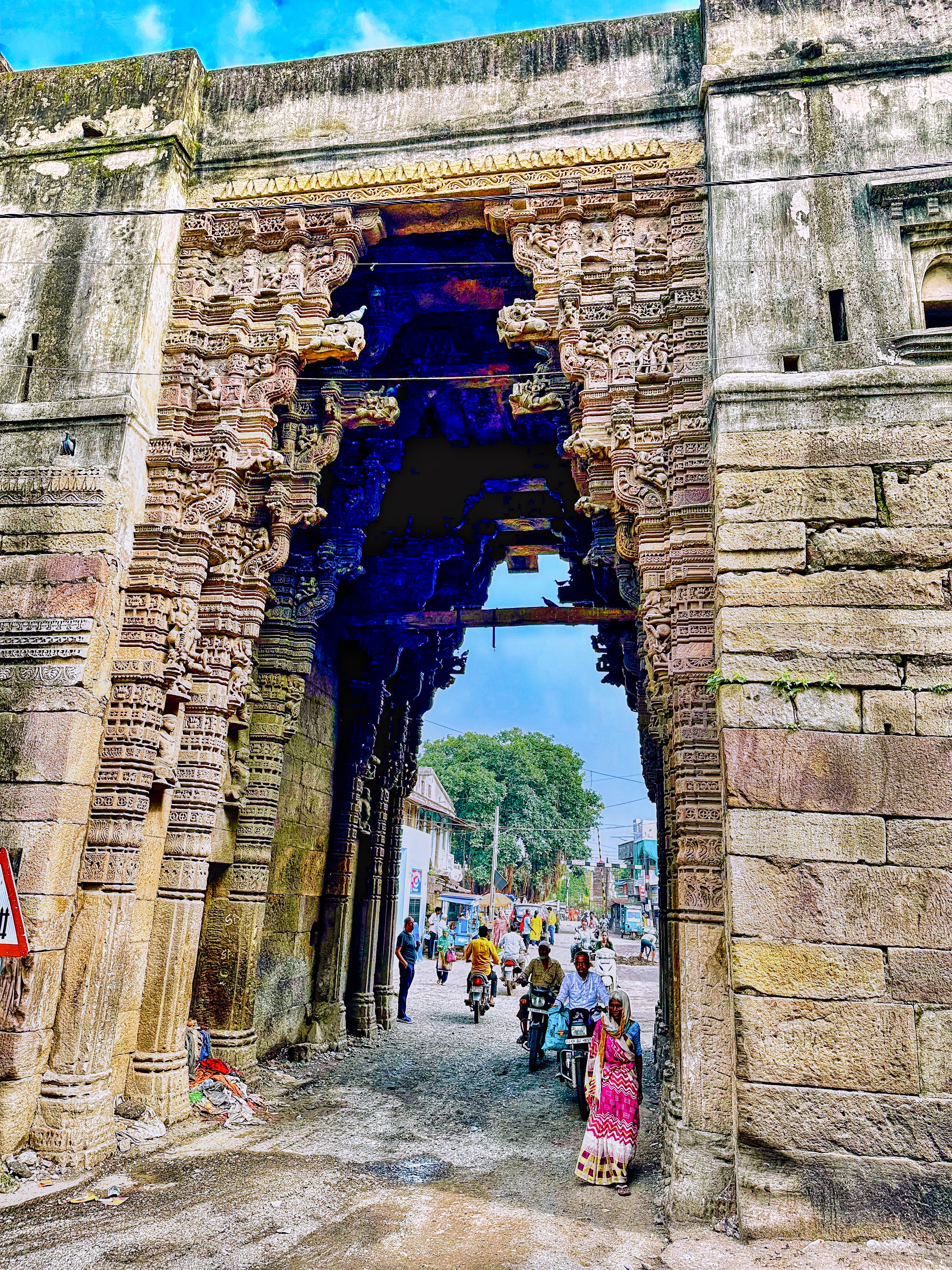
The Mahudi Gate features a depiction of Shiva as Nataraja.

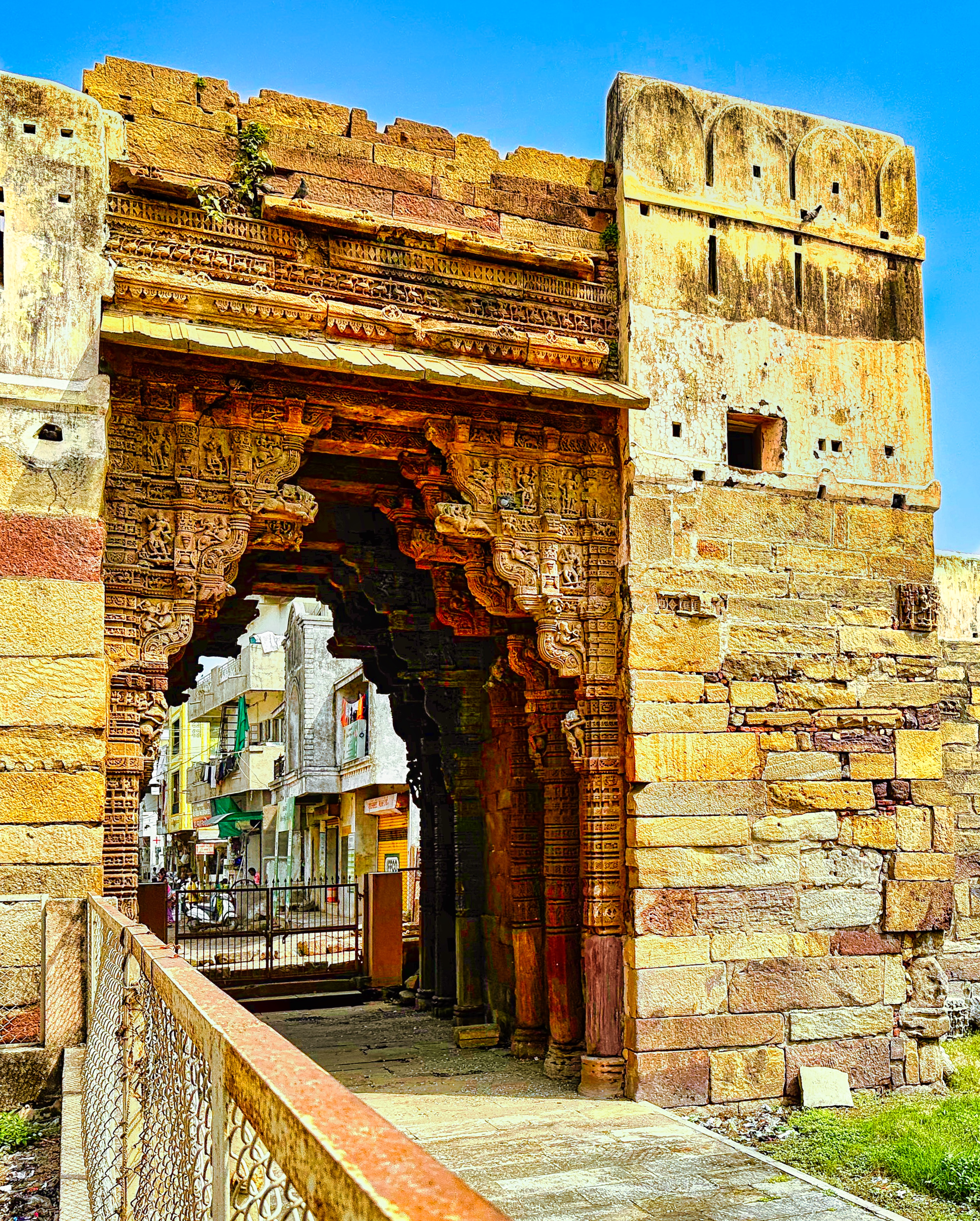
The Nandod Gate features a depiction of the Trimurti, although the sculpture of Vishnu is now missing.

== Geography ==
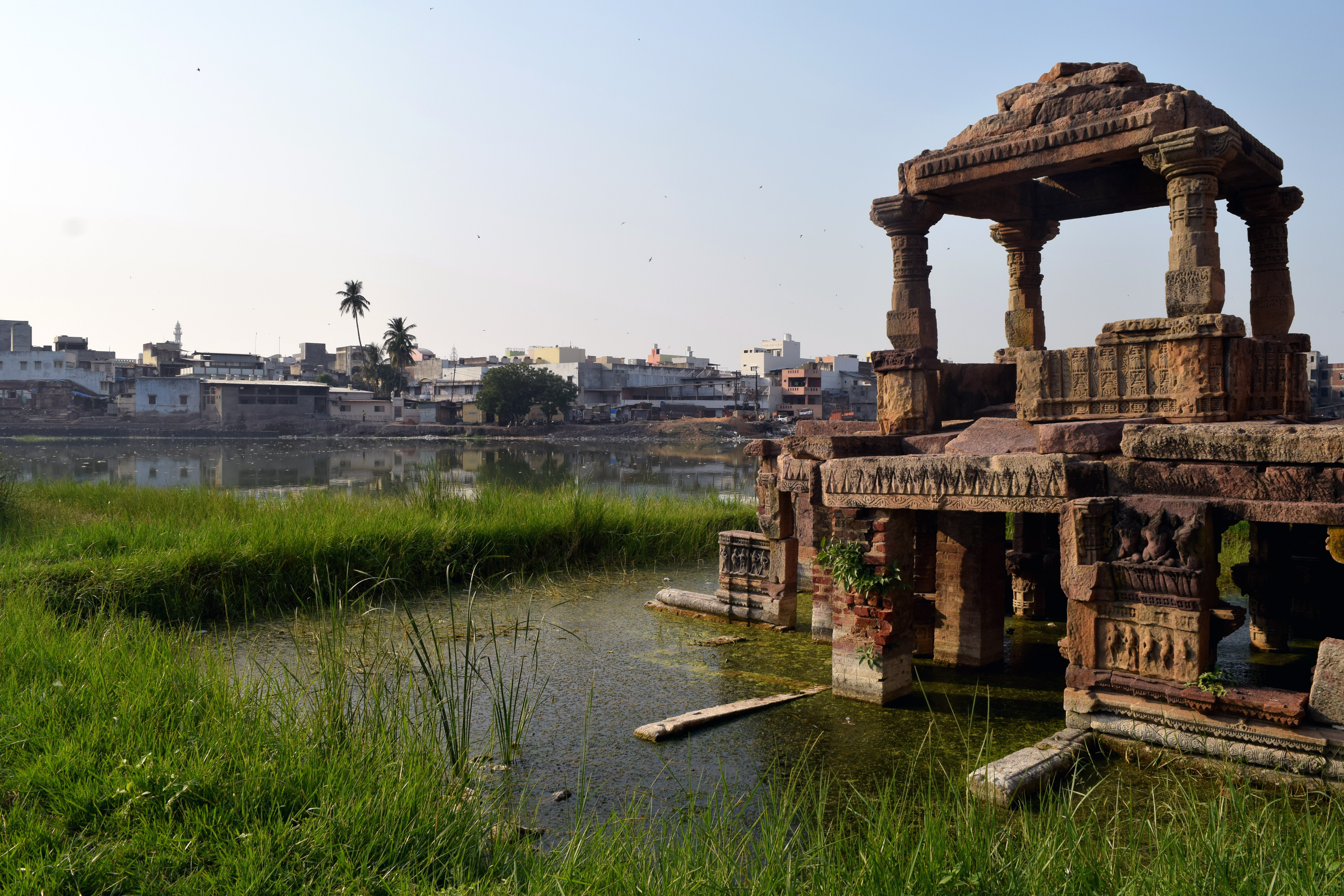
The Saptamukhi Vav, located in the corner of a peninsula into the town's large tank, was originally a temple to Shiva.

Dabhoi is located at 22.18°N 73.43°E. It has an average elevation of 99 metres (324 feet).

== Demographics ==
As of the 2001 India census, Dabhoi had a population of 54,930. Males constitute 52% of the population and females 48%. Dabhoi has an average literacy rate of 68%, higher than the national average of 59.5%: male literacy is 75% and, female literacy is 61%. In Dabhoi, 10% of the population is under 6 years of age.

== Ecology ==
The Wadhvana Wetland located here is a wetland that was designated as a Ramsar wetland site on 2021.

== Transport ==
Dabhoi Junction railway station is the main junction station in Vadodara division of Western Railway. Pratapnagar (Vadodara)-Dabhoi-Bodeli-Chhota Udaipur has been converted to a broad gauge. The remaining Narrow Gauge lines existing today at Dabhoi are Dabhoi-Miyagam Karjan-Choranda-Moti Koral/Malsar, Dabhoi-Chandod-Kevadiya (Ekta Nagar), Dabhoi-Samlaya Jn.-Timba Road. It has undergone major changes recently. In the latest Railway Budget plan has been made of Gauge Conversion of Dabhoi-Miyagam and Dabhoi-Samalaya Jn. stretch to reduce the freight traffic at Vadodara Jn.
