= Wadhvana Wetland =

Protected area in Gugarat, India

Coordinates: 22.172°N 73.486°E

The Wadhwana wetland is a wetland in Dabhoi, Vadodara district in the Indian state of Gujarat. It was formed as a result of an irrigation dam in 1910. Due to its ecological significance, it was designated as a Ramsar wetland site on 2021.

== Ecological significance ==
The Wadhvana Wetland is considered internationally important as it provides a wintering ground to migratory water birds that migrate on the Central Asian Flyway. These water birds include endangered or near-threatened species like the Dalmatian pelican (Pelecanus crispus), Pallas's fish eagle (Haliaeetus leucoryphus), common pochard (Aythya ferina), ferruginous duck (Aythya nyroca) and grey-headed fish eagle (Icthyophaga ichthyaetus). The red-crested pochard (Netta rufina), a duck that is otherwise rare in Western India, is observed in this wetland during winter.

== See also ==
- Nanda Lake
- Banni grasslands
