= Nyay Mandir =

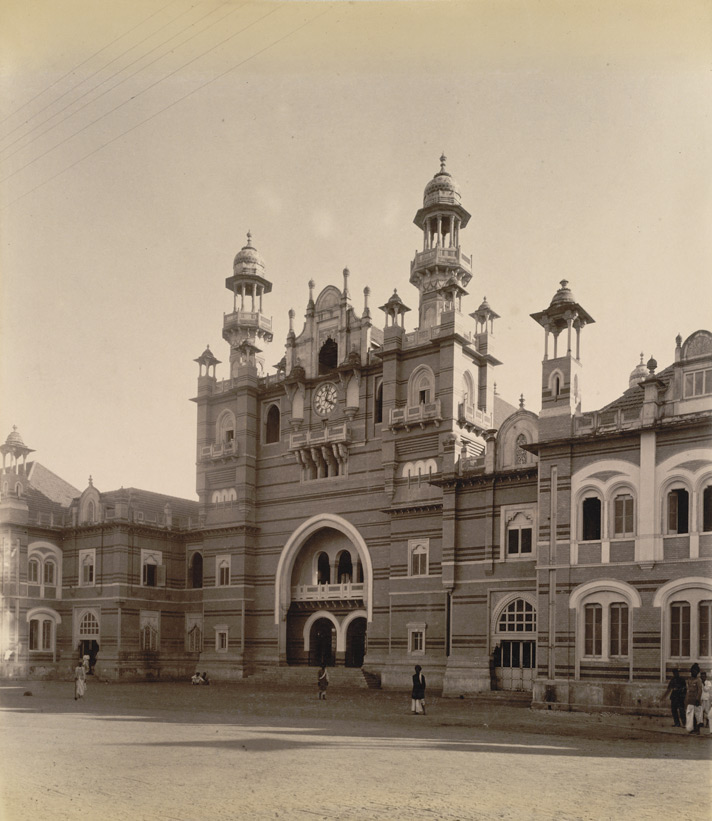
- The Nyaya Mandir in the 1890s
- Interactive map of the Nyay Mandir area

General information
- Architectural style: Indo-Saracenic architecture
- Location: Vadodara, Gujarat, India
- Coordinates: 22.2966°N 73.2015°E
- Opened: 30 November 1896
- Cost: ₹744,000
- Client: Maharaja Sayajirao Gaekwad III

Technical details
- Material: Brick, mortar, stone

Design and construction
- Architect: Robert Chisholm

The Nyay Mandir, lit. 'Temple of Justice', is a court building in Vadodara in the state of Gujarat, western India.

== History ==
"I wish to commemorate the virtues of Her Late Highness and the admiration I entertained for her-the mild, charitable, amiable woman, the devoted mother and loving wife."

—Words by Sayajirao Gaekwad III as he laid the foundation stone for ‘The Maharani Chimnabai Market’ in memory of his queen.

Maharaja Sayajirao Gaekwad III, ruler of Baroda State, opened the building on 30 November 1896 and named it after his deceased wife Chimnabai I. Then this vegetable market building near Sursagar Lake was named 'The Maharani Chimnabai Market'. It was later used as a town hall. The building was then converted in an imperial court named 'Maharani Chimnabai Nyay Mandir'.

When Baroda State was merged with the Union of India, the last ruler Pratapsinhrao Gaekwad delivered his last public speech from the building. It used to house the District Court of Vadodara city.

It was built at the cost of ₹7.44 lakh (equivalent to ₹28 crore or US$3.3 million in 2023).

== Architecture ==
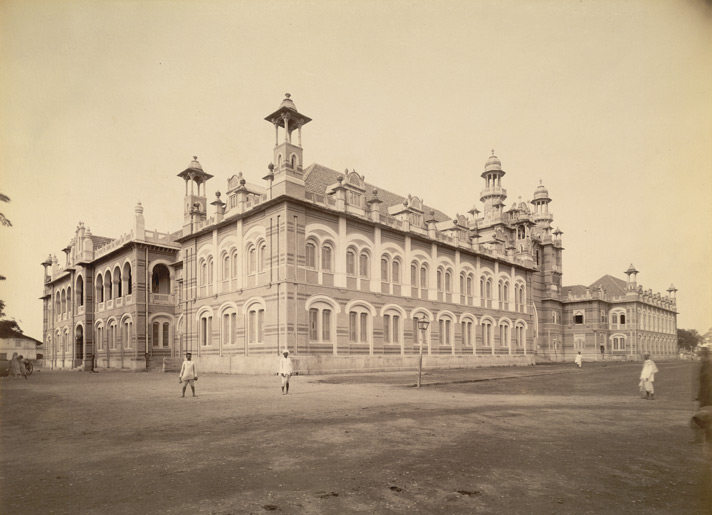
South-east view of the Nyaya Mandir in the 1890s.

It is a piece of Indo-Saracenic architecture style. It was designed by Robert Chisholm, the state architect of Baroda. There was a large central hall measuring 115 feet by 86 feet with galleries on both sides and decorated with mosaic work. There is a clock on front side of the building.

A white marble statue of Chimnabai I is placed in the main room of the Nyay Mandir.
