= Chimnabai Lake =

Artificial lake in Mehsana district, Gujarat, India

- Location within Gujarat
- Interactive map of Chimnabai Lake
- Location: Kadarpur, Kheralu Taluka, Mehsana district, Gujarat
- Coordinates: 23.93016653°N 72.64284648°E
- Lake type: Artificial lake
- Primary inflows: Storm water
- Primary outflows: Canals
- Catchment area: 33.4 square miles (87 km^{2})
- Basin countries: India
- Max. length: 3 miles (4.8 km)
- Surface area: 1,600 acres (6.5 km^{2})
- Max. depth: 190.4 metres (625 ft)
- Water volume: 632,000,000 cubic feet (17,900,000 m^{3})

Chimnabai Lake is located near Kadarpur village in Kheralu Taluka, Mehsana district in the Indian state of Gujarat.

The lake was created by Baroda State ruler Sayajirao Gaekwad III in memory of his deceased wife Chimnabai I. The construction was started in 1898 and completed in 1905. Local people have long demanded that the lake should be supplied water via Narmada canal or Dharoi dam.

The lake is spread over an area of 1,600 acres (6.5 km^{2}). It has a water storage capacity of 632 million cubic feet. The lake provides irrigation to 900 hectares (2,200 acres) land of ten villages.
