= Raopura =

Coordinates: 22.3039°N 73.200278°E

Raopura is an area of Vadodara city, Gujarat, India. It is located in the Eastern part of the city.

The Chimnabai Clock Tower, Kothi Kacheri (Vadodara District Collectorate & Commissioner Office) are situated in this area. Raopura is a shopping area for citizens of Vadodara. It has large-small commercial shops.
