= Sursagar Lake =

- Chand Talao
- Location within Gujarat
- Location: Vadodara, Gujarat, India
- Coordinates: 22°18′03″N 73°12′13″E
- Type: lake

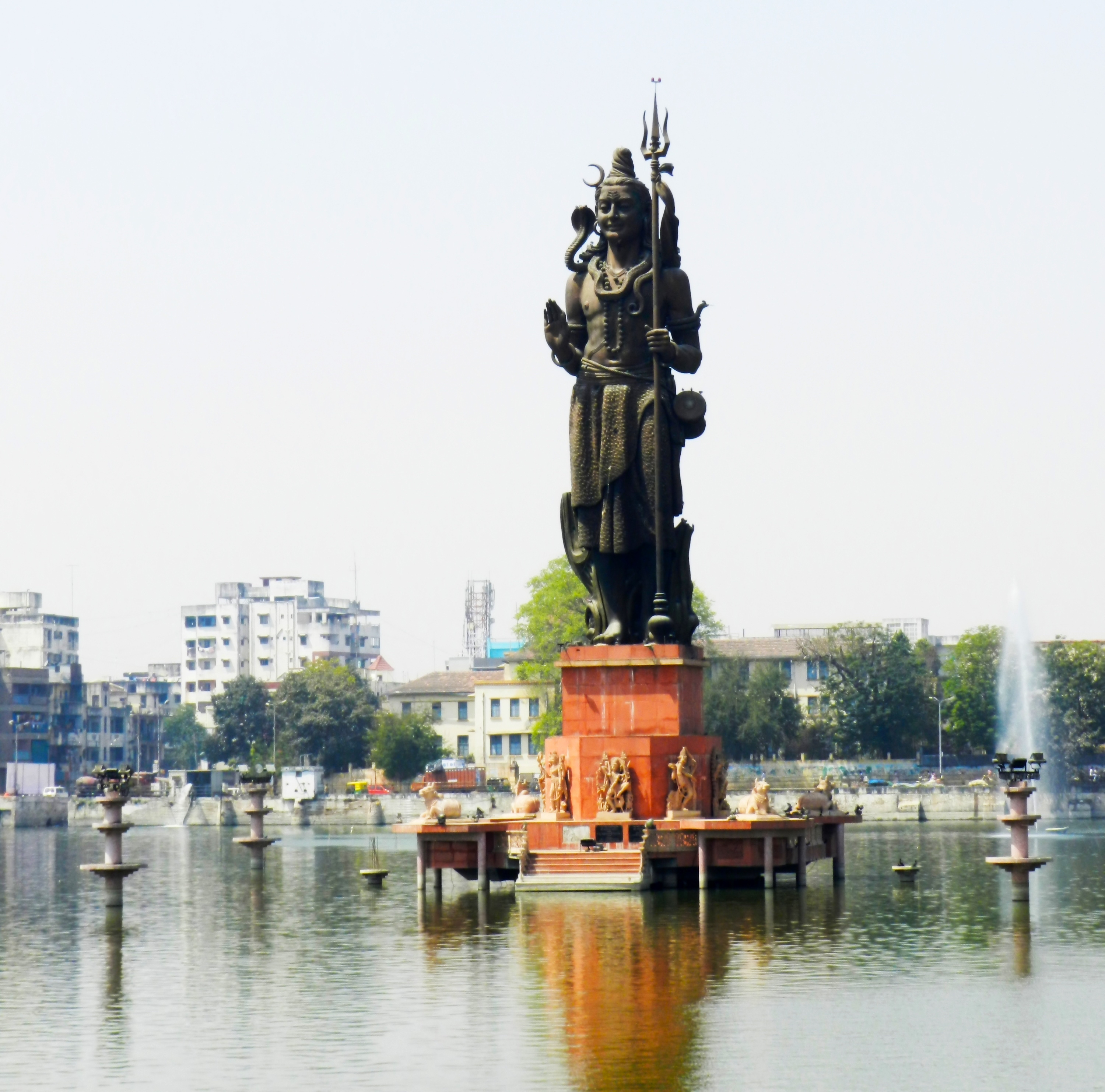

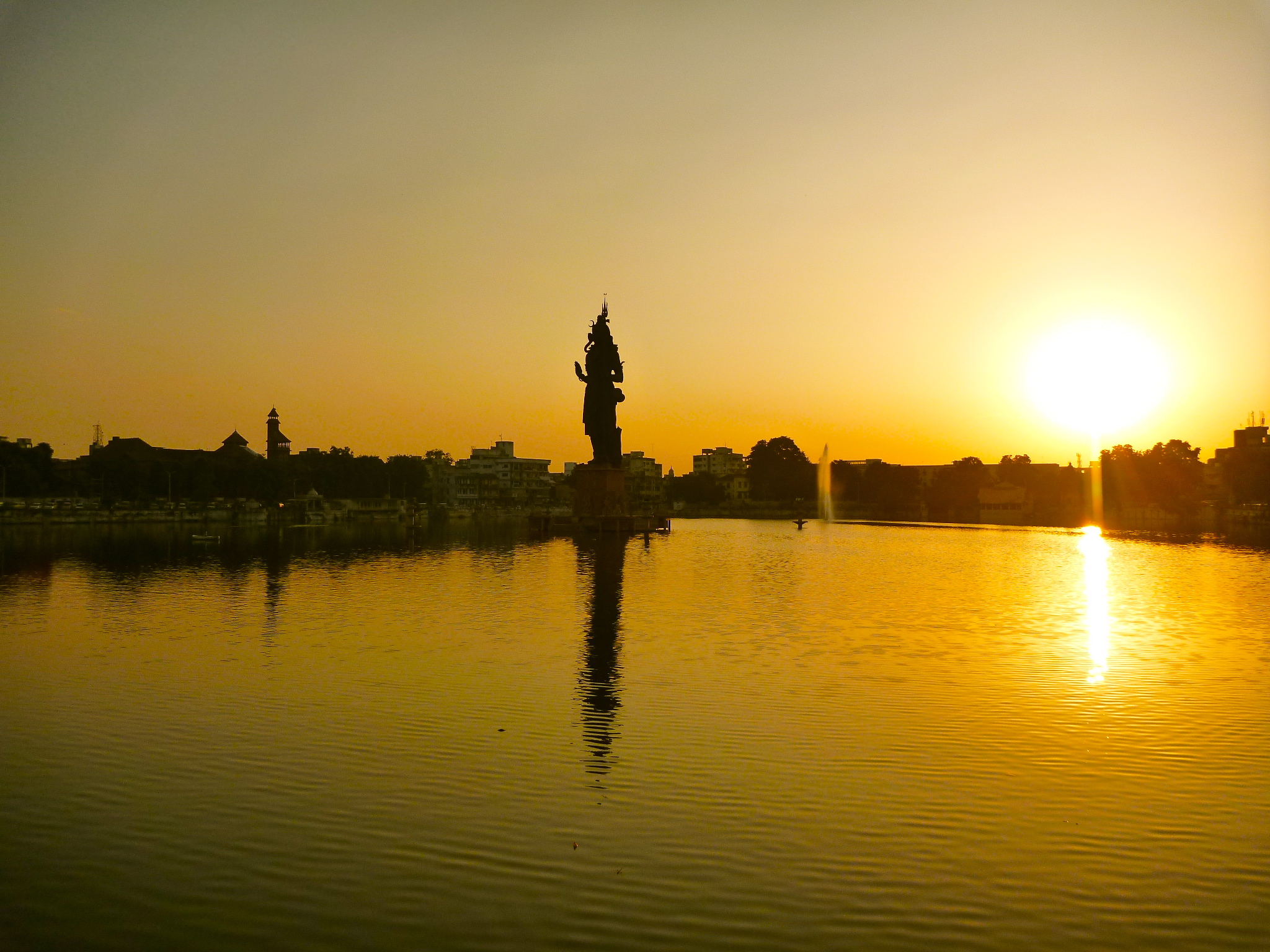
Sursagar Lake in Vadodara

Sursagar Lake, also known as the Chand Talao, is a lake situated in the middle of the city of Vadodara in the state of Gujarat in India.

== History ==
The lake was rebuilt with stone masonry in the 18th century.

In 1993, the boat had capsized in the lake killing 22 people.

Yogesh Patel, a local politician and the member of Gujarat Legislative Assembly, founded the Satyam Shivam Sundaram Committee which installed the 111 feet (34 m) tall statue of Sarveshwar Mahadev (Shiva) in the middle of the lake. The construction of the statue began in 1996 and ended in 2002. Total 23 pilings were driven 78 feet deep to support the statue. When inaugurated, it was considered the tallest Shiva statue in India. Yogesh Patel founded the Suvarna Sankalp Foundation which utilized about 17.5 kg (39 lb) of gold to gild the statue and dedicated it to the city on the day of Mahashivratri in 2023. The value of gold itself is about 12 crore Indian Rupees ($1,449,879.60 as of February 2023).

At night, the statue is illuminated and is visible across the lake.

Sarveshwar Mahadev statue...

== Features ==
The water in this lake remains in it for the whole year. A concrete wall surrounds the lake on which the people use to sit.

The lake is used for boating.

There are many underwater gates in the lake which empty the lake if it overflows. The water from the lake empties in the Vishvamitri River.
